= Tolleson =

Tolleson can refer to:

== People ==
- Gina Tolleson (born 1969), Miss World 1990
- Jeremy Tolleson (born 1982), retired American soccer player
- Ross Tolleson (born 1956), Republican state senator from Georgia
- Steven Tolleson (born 1983), Major League Baseball player, son of Wayne Tolleson
- Tommy Tolleson (born 1943), American football player
- Wayne Tolleson (born 1955), Major League Baseball player
- Walter G. Tolleson (1860-1940), Arizona rancher, businessman, and pioneer.

== Places ==
- Tolleson, Arizona, a city
