= Spartanburg, South Carolina =

Spartanburg
- City
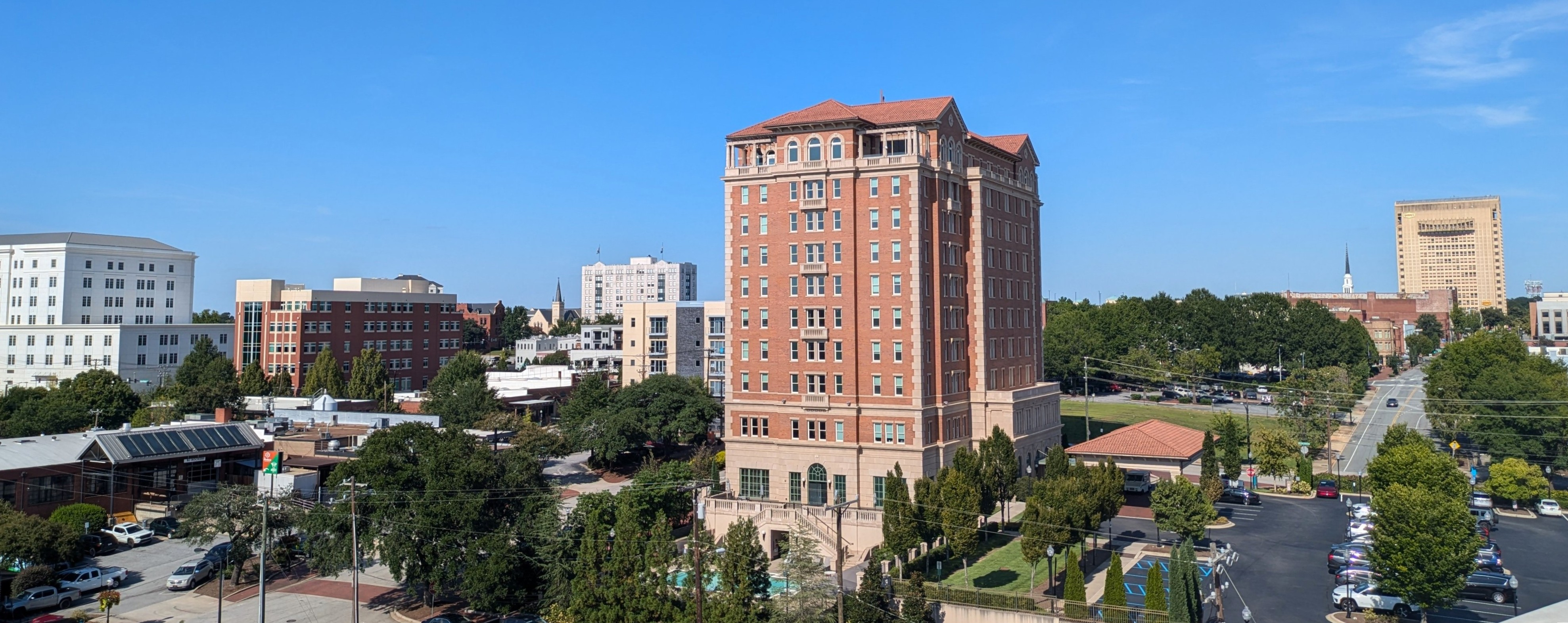
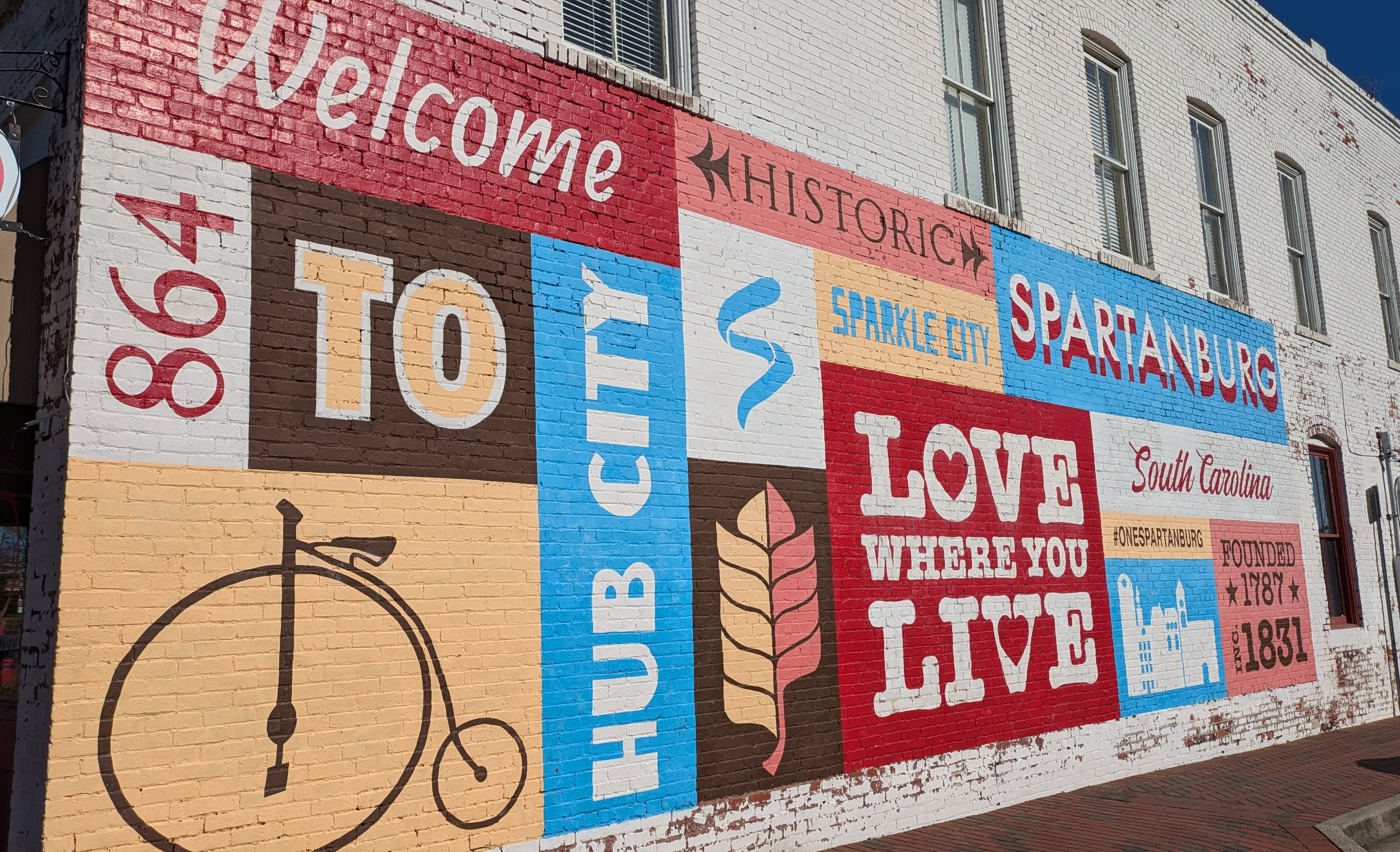
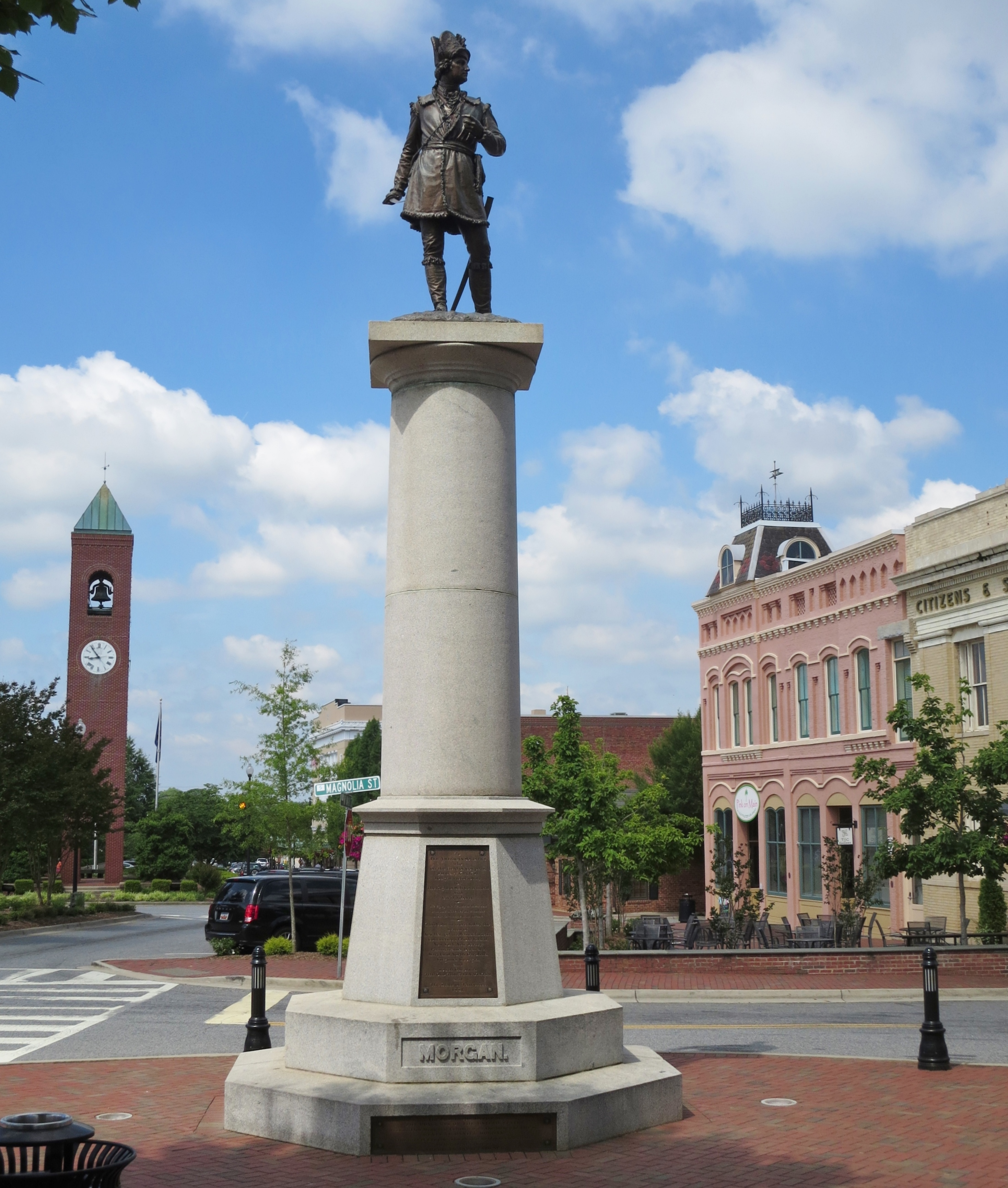
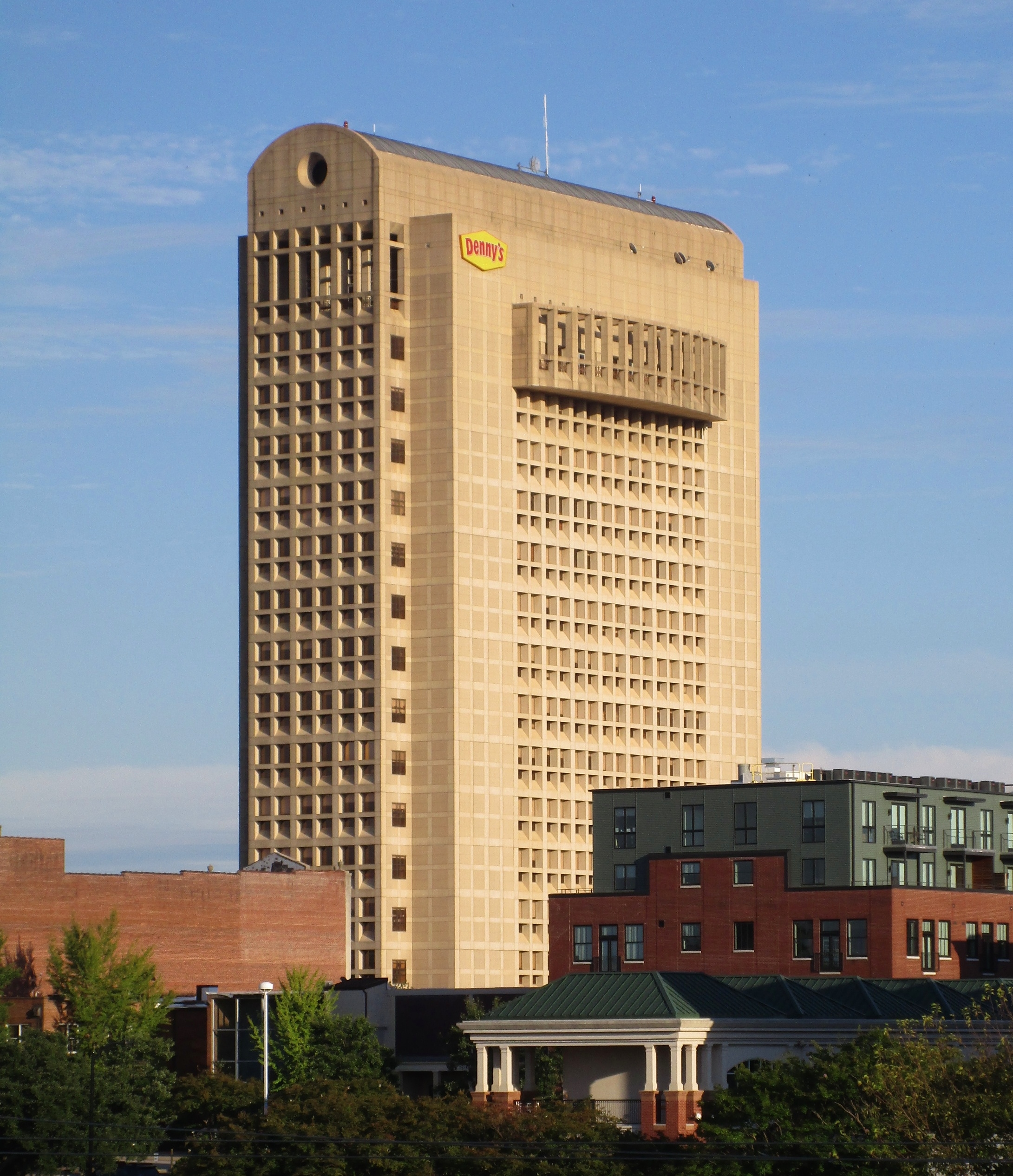
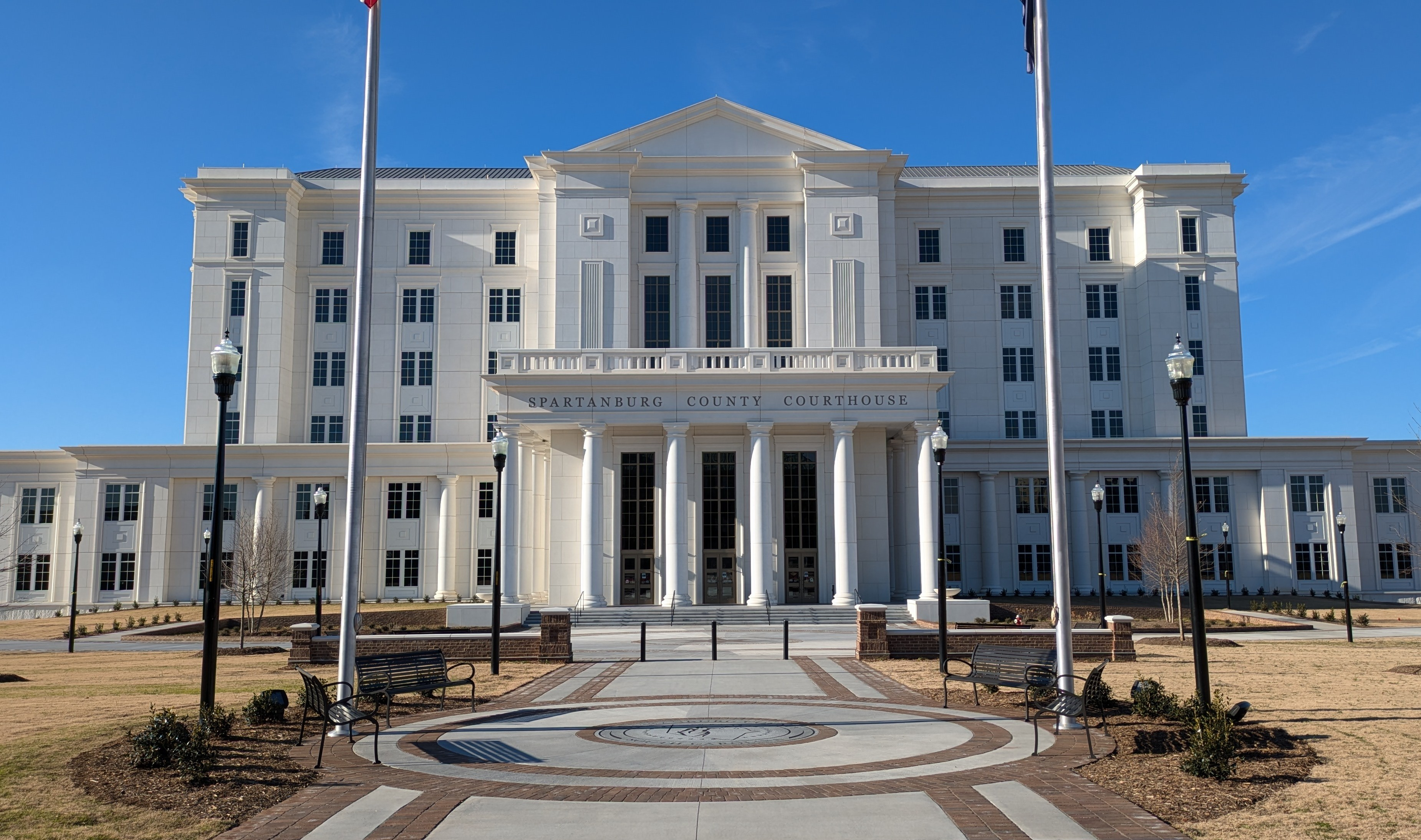
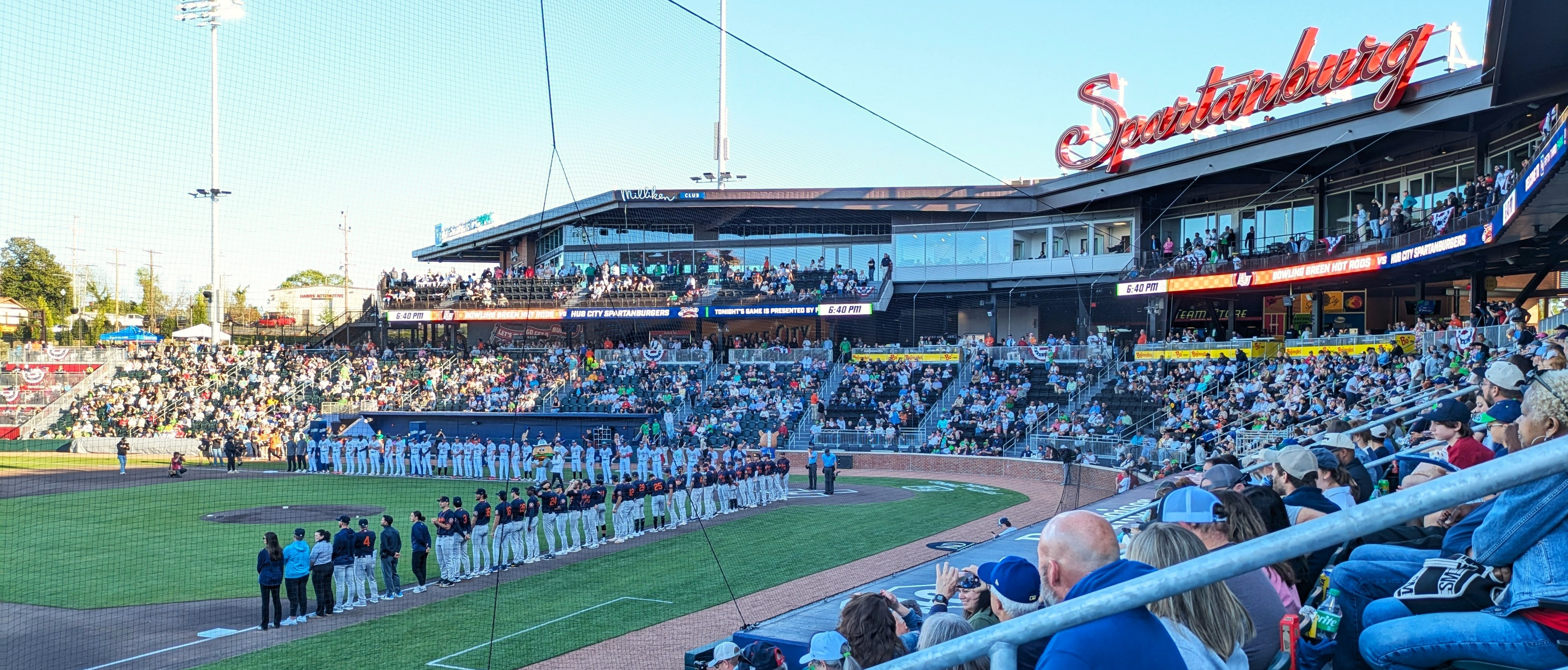
- Downtown Spartanburg skyline Love Where You Live mural Daniel Morgan Monument Denny's Tower Spartanburg County courthouse Fifth Third Park during a Hub City Spartanburgers game

- Seal Logo
- Nicknames: The Hub City, Sparkle City, The Burg
- Motto: "Always Doing"
- Interactive map of Spartanburg
- Location within South Carolina Location within the United States
- Coordinates: 34°56′58″N 81°55′30″W
- Country: United States
- State: South Carolina
- County: Spartanburg
- Founded: 1787
- Incorporated: 1831
- Named for: The Spartan Regiment

Government
  - Mayor: Jerome Rice

Area
  - City: 20.37 sq mi (52.75 km^{2})
  - Land: 20.25 sq mi (52.46 km^{2})
  - Water: 0.11 sq mi (0.29 km^{2}) 0.54%
- Elevation: 745 ft (227 m)

Population (2020)
  - City: 38,732
  - Rank: 11th in South Carolina
  - Density: 1,912.4/sq mi (738.37/km^{2})
  - Urban: 196,943 (US: 198th)
  - Urban density: 1,088.1/sq mi (420.1/km^{2})
  - Metro: 383,327 (US: 144th)
- Demonym: Spartans
- Time zone: UTC−05:00 (Eastern)
  - Summer (DST): UTC−04:00 (Eastern)
- ZIP Codes: 29301–29307, 29316, 29319
- Area codes: 864, 821
- FIPS code: 45-68290
- GNIS feature ID: 2405505
- Website: www.cityofspartanburg.org

Spartanburg, also known as "Sparkle City", is a city in and the county seat of Spartanburg County, South Carolina, United States. The city had a population of 38,732 as of the 2020 census, making it the state's 11th-most populous city. The Office of Management and Budget (OMB) groups Spartanburg and Union counties together as the Spartanburg, SC Metropolitan Statistical Area.

Spartanburg is the second-largest city in the greater Greenville–Spartanburg–Anderson, SC Combined Statistical Area, which had an estimated population of 1,590,636 in 2023. It is part of a ten-county region of northwestern South Carolina known as "The Upstate", and is 98 miles (158 km) northwest of Columbia, 80 miles (130 km) west of Charlotte, North Carolina, and about 190 miles (310 km) northeast of Atlanta, Georgia.

Spartanburg is the home of Wofford College, Converse University, Spartanburg Community College, and Edward Via College of Osteopathic Medicine. The area is home to USC Upstate, Sherman College of Chiropractic, and Spartanburg Methodist College. It is also the site of Denny's corporate headquarters.

== History ==
Spartanburg was formed in 1785 after a deal was made with the Cherokee in 1753, and was named after a local militia in the American Revolutionary War, the Spartan Regiment. The regiment, commanded by Andrew Pickens, participated in the Battle of Cowpens. In 1831, Spartanburg was incorporated, later becoming known as the "Hub City"; railroad lines radiated from it like wheel spokes.

Spartanburg became a center of textile manufacturing in the late 19th century, with around 40 textile mills established through the early 1900s.

In 1911, under the sponsorship of the Spartanburg Herald and the United Daughters of the Confederacy, the city built a Confederate monument at the intersection of South Church and Henry Streets, overlooking downtown. In 1966 it was moved to Duncan Park.

During World War I, 100,000 soldiers trained at Camp Wadsworth. Camp Croft trained soldiers during World War II. The facility was transferred to the state and adapted as Croft State Park.

By the 1950s, production at Spartanburg's mills had begun to decline as wages increased. Most textile manufacturing jobs were moved offshore.

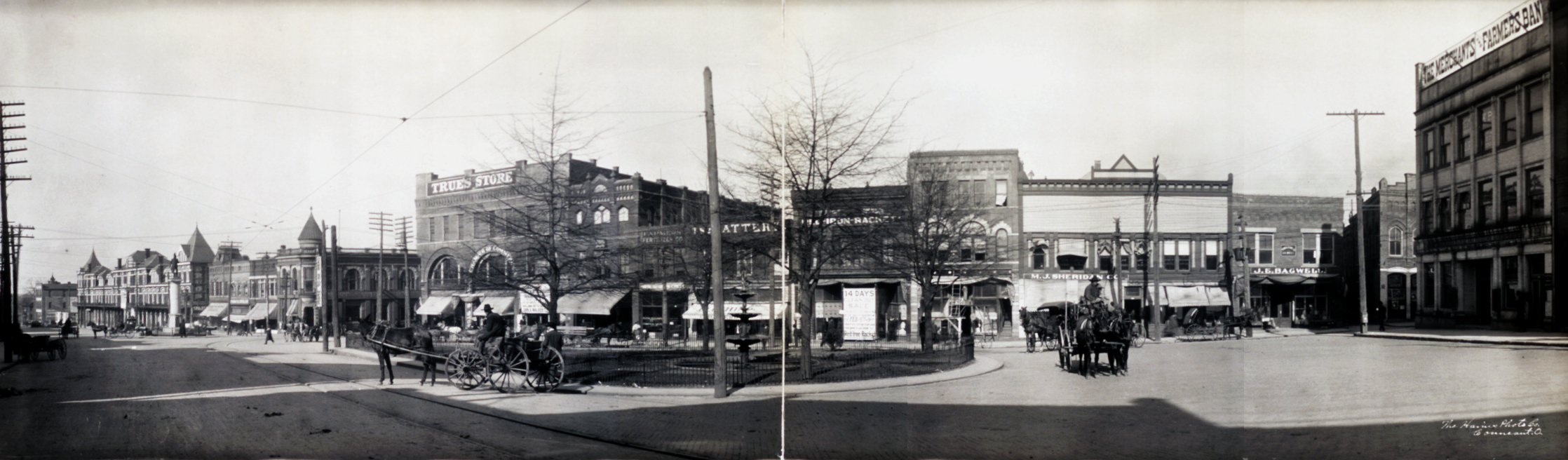
Spartanburg in 1909

== Geography ==
According to the United States Census Bureau, the city has an area of 20.37 square miles (52.8 km^{2}), of which 20.25 square miles (52.4 km^{2}) is land and 0.11 square miles (0.28 km^{2}) (0.54%) is water. The most common soil series is Cecil. The bedrock is mostly biotite gneiss.

=== Climate ===
The city of Spartanburg has a humid subtropical climate with long, hot, and humid summers, and cool to semi-mild winters. The average annual temperature is 61.6 °F (16.4 °C). In the summer from June through September, average highs are in the 80s °F (20s °C) to low 90s °F (30s °C), while in the winter, average highs are in the mid-50s °F (10s °C). Annual rainfall is spread fairly evenly throughout the whole year. Spartanburg receives very little snowfall, with the annual average being only 1.4 inches (3.6 cm). Average precipitation is 51.3 inches (130 cm) and the average growing season is 231 days.

Climate data for Spartanburg, South Carolina (1991–2020 normals, extremes 1948–present)
Month	Jan	Feb	Mar	Apr	May	Jun	Jul	Aug	Sep	Oct	Nov	Dec	Year
Record high °F (°C)	80 (27)	82 (28)	90 (32)	94 (34)	98 (37)	104 (40)	106 (41)	106 (41)	100 (38)	99 (37)	85 (29)	80 (27)	106 (41)
Mean daily maximum °F (°C)	54.1 (12.3)	58.5 (14.7)	66.0 (18.9)	74.8 (23.8)	81.0 (27.2)	87.0 (30.6)	90.1 (32.3)	88.3 (31.3)	83.4 (28.6)	74.4 (23.6)	63.8 (17.7)	55.8 (13.2)	73.1 (22.8)
Daily mean °F (°C)	42.8 (6.0)	46.1 (7.8)	52.9 (11.6)	61.1 (16.2)	68.5 (20.3)	75.8 (24.3)	79.3 (26.3)	78.1 (25.6)	72.5 (22.5)	61.7 (16.5)	51.1 (10.6)	44.7 (7.1)	61.2 (16.2)
Mean daily minimum °F (°C)	31.5 (−0.3)	33.8 (1.0)	39.8 (4.3)	47.3 (8.5)	56.0 (13.3)	64.6 (18.1)	68.6 (20.3)	67.8 (19.9)	61.6 (16.4)	49.0 (9.4)	38.4 (3.6)	33.6 (0.9)	49.3 (9.6)
Record low °F (°C)	−5 (−21)	3 (−16)	7 (−14)	22 (−6)	29 (−2)	37 (3)	51 (11)	46 (8)	35 (2)	23 (−5)	11 (−12)	0 (−18)	−5 (−21)
Average precipitation inches (mm)	4.34 (110)	3.77 (96)	4.81 (122)	4.29 (109)	3.92 (100)	4.58 (116)	3.97 (101)	4.56 (116)	3.65 (93)	3.93 (100)	3.72 (94)	4.70 (119)	50.24 (1,276)
Average snowfall inches (cm)	0.4 (1.0)	0.0 (0.0)	0.2 (0.51)	0.0 (0.0)	0.0 (0.0)	0.0 (0.0)	0.0 (0.0)	0.0 (0.0)	0.0 (0.0)	0.0 (0.0)	0.0 (0.0)	0.2 (0.51)	0.8 (2.0)
Average precipitation days (≥ 0.01 in)	9.3	8.2	9.5	8.0	7.9	9.2	9.3	8.4	6.6	6.2	7.1	9.1	98.8
Average snowy days (≥ 0.1 in)	0.1	0.0	0.1	0.0	0.0	0.0	0.0	0.0	0.0	0.0	0.0	0.2	0.4
Source: NOAA

== Demographics ==
Historical population
Census	Pop.	Note	%±
1850	1,176		—
1860	1,216		3.4%
1870	1,080		−11.2%
1880	3,253		201.2%
1890	5,544		70.4%
1900	11,395		105.5%
1910	17,517		53.7%
1920	22,638		29.2%
1930	28,723		26.9%
1940	32,249		12.3%
1950	36,795		14.1%
1960	44,352		20.5%
1970	44,546		0.4%
1980	43,826		−1.6%
1990	43,467		−0.8%
2000	39,673		−8.7%
2010	37,013		−6.7%
2020	38,732		4.6%
2025 (est.)	39,978	▲	3.2%
U.S. Decennial Census; 2020

=== Racial and ethnic composition ===
Spartanburg city, South Carolina – Racial and ethnic composition Note: the US Census treats Hispanic/Latino as an ethnic category. This table excludes Latinos from the racial categories and assigns them to a separate category. Hispanics/Latinos may be of any race.
Race / Ethnicity (NH = Non-Hispanic)	Pop 2000	Pop 2010	Pop 2020	% 2000	% 2010	% 2020
White alone (NH)	18,433	16,267	17,076	46.46%	43.95%	44.09%
Black or African American alone (NH)	19,559	18,156	16,945	49.30%	49.05%	43.75%
Native American or Alaska Native alone (NH)	68	68	67	0.17%	0.18%	0.17%
Asian alone (NH)	523	660	787	1.32%	1.78%	2.03%
Native Hawaiian or Pacific Islander alone (NH)	17	10	64	0.04%	0.03%	0.17%
Other race alone (NH)	38	51	172	0.10%	0.14%	0.44%
Mixed race or Multiracial (NH)	329	537	1,341	0.83%	1.45%	3.46%
Hispanic or Latino (any race)	706	1,264	2,280	1.78%	3.42%	5.89%
Total	39,673	37,013	38,732	100.00%	100.00%	100.00%

Racial composition as of the 2020 census
Race	Number	Percent
White	17,538	45.3%
Black or African American	17,071	44.1%
American Indian and Alaska Native	116	0.3%
Asian	811	2.1%
Native Hawaiian and Other Pacific Islander	66	0.2%
Some other race	1,139	2.9%
Two or more races	1,991	5.1%

=== 2020 census ===
As of the 2020 census, 38,732 people, 15,876 households, and 8,638 families resided in the city. The median age was 35.7 years, with 22.4% of residents under the age of 18 and 17.4% aged 65 years or older. For every 100 females there were 82.7 males, and for every 100 females age 18 and over there were 77.4 males age 18 and over.

100.0% of residents lived in urban areas, while 0.0% lived in rural areas.

There were 15,876 households in Spartanburg, of which 27.8% had children under the age of 18 living in them. Of all households, 30.4% were married-couple households, 20.7% were households with a male householder and no spouse or partner present, and 42.7% were households with a female householder and no spouse or partner present. About 37.0% of all households were made up of individuals, and 14.9% had someone living alone who was 65 years of age or older.

There were 17,419 housing units, of which 8.9% were vacant. The homeowner vacancy rate was 2.2% and the rental vacancy rate was 7.3%.

=== 2010 census ===
At the 2010 census, there were 37,013 people, 15,989 households, and 9,721 families residing in the city. The population density was 2,066.3 inhabitants per square mile (797.8/km^{2}). The 17,696 housing units had an average density of 923.9 per square mile (356.7/km^{2}). The racial makeup was 49.55% African American, 47.15% White, 0.18% Native American, 1.33% Asian, 0.82% from other races, and 0.96% from two or more races. Hispanics or Latinos of any race were 1.78% of the population.

Of the 15,989 households, 28.9% had children under 18 living with them, 34.0% were married couples living together, 23.0% had a female householder with no husband present, and 39.2% were not families. About 34.0% of all households were made up of individuals, and 13.2% had someone living alone who was 65 or older. The average household size was 2.33, and the average family size was 3.00.

In the city, the age distribution was 25.2% under 18, 12.2% from 18 to 24, 26.6% from 25 to 44, 20.6% from 45 to 64, and 15.4% who were 65 or older. The median age was 35 years. For every 100 females, there were 79.6 males.

The median income for a household in the city was $28,735, and for a family was $36,108. Males had a median income of $30,587 versus $23,256 for females. The per capita income for the city was $18,136. About 29.4% of families and 23.3% of the population were below the poverty line, including 34.6% of those under age 18 and 15.4% of those age 65 or over.

== Economy ==
Developers and community leaders have spearheaded an effort to revitalize Spartanburg's downtown commercial district. This has resulted in a remodeling of Morgan Square, restoration of several historic structures, and relocation of several businesses and company headquarters to the downtown vicinity. These new developments include a nine-floor, 240-room Marriott hotel.

Spartanburg is home to many large companies, including Denny's, KYMCO, Smith Drug Company, Advance America Cash Advance, Southern Conference, Spartanburg Herald-Journal, RJ Rockers Brewing Company, American Credit Acceptance, and Upward Sports.

Spartanburg's economy benefits from the BMW manufacturing facility in Greer, South Carolina, in Spartanburg County. As of 2017, the plant employed about 8,800 people with an average daily output of about 1,400 vehicles.

Spartanburg is also home to the world headquarters and research facility for Milliken & Company, a textile and chemical manufacturer.

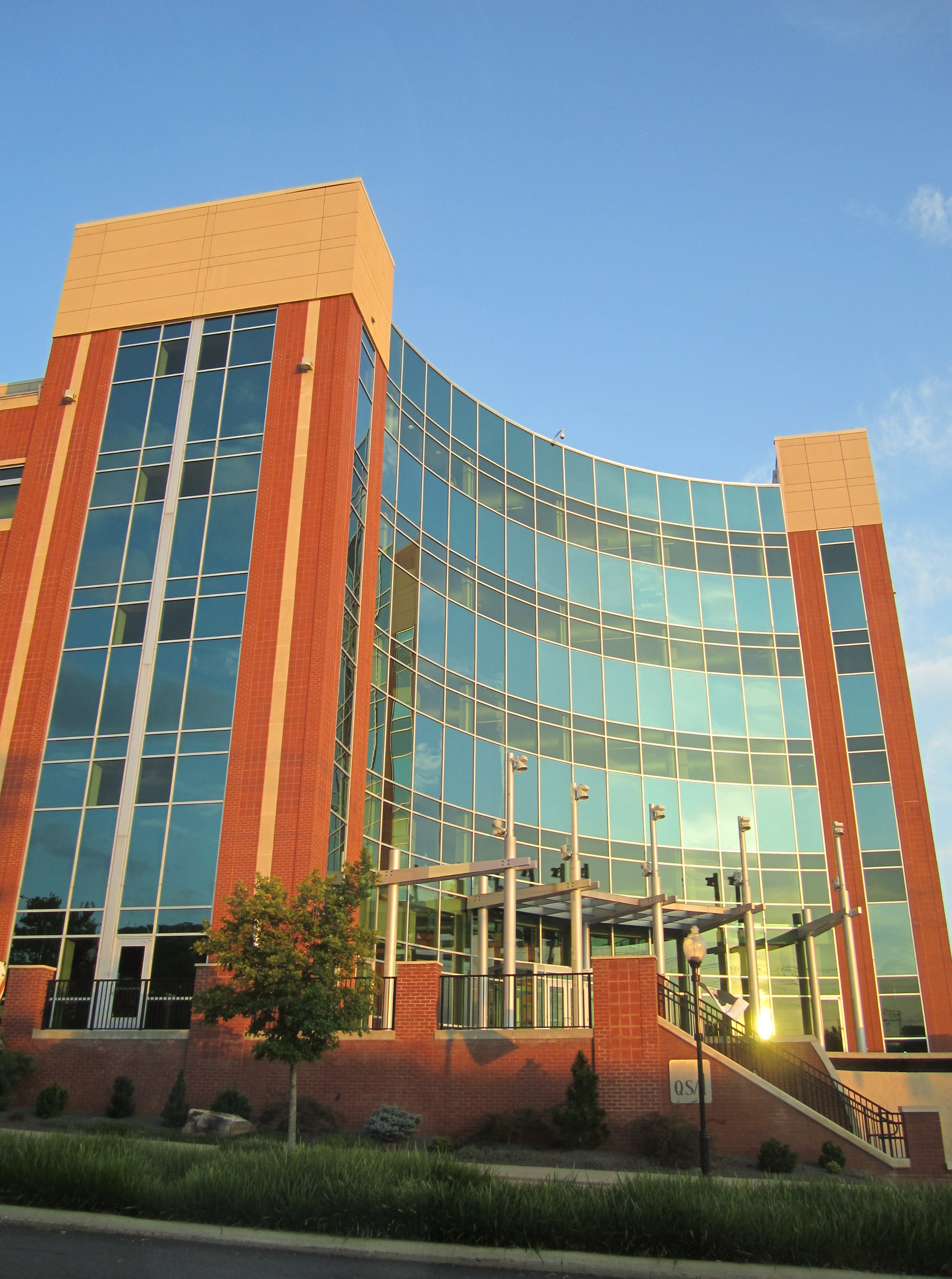
QS/1 Data Systems headquarters

=== Top employers ===
According to Spartanburg's 2022 Comprehensive Annual Financial Report, its principal employers are:

#	Employer	# of employees
1	Spartanburg Regional	9,648
2	Spartanburg County	1,515
3	Spartanburg School District 7	1,273
4	RedSail Technologies, LLC	485
5	Wofford College	421
6	City of Spartanburg	416
7	Spartanburg Hospital for Restorative Care	300
8	Converse University	260
9	Denny's Corporate Office	250
10	Advance America, Inc.	233

== Arts and culture ==
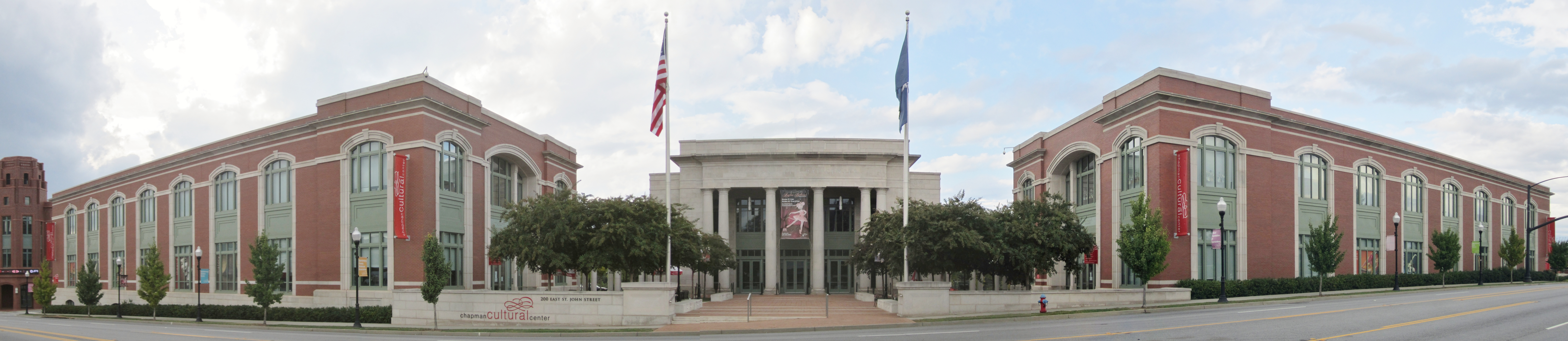
Panoramic view of the Chapman Cultural Center

Cultural events and institutions in the city include:

- Chapman Cultural Center, Spartanburg's cultural anchor for history, art, theatre, dance, music, and science, is in a three-building complex on the northern edge of downtown. Opened in October 2007, the Center was designed by David M. Schwarz Architects of Washington, D.C. It houses the Spartanburg Art Museum, Spartanburg County Regional History Museum, Science Center, Little Theatre, Ballet, Music Foundation, and other groups that were formerly in The Arts Center on South Spring Street. It is owned and operated by The Arts Partnership of Greater Spartanburg, a nonprofit organization dedicated to supporting arts and cultural agencies in Spartanburg County.
- Converse University is a nationally known four-year liberal arts institution recognized for its strong music and visual art programs. It hosts events open to the community throughout the year. Twichell Auditorium is on the campus of Converse University. Home of the Greater Spartanburg Philharmonic Orchestra, the auditorium has hosted other groups, such as the Spartanburg All-County High School Band and Boston Brass. Twichell Auditorium was built in 1899 and renovated for the school's centennial celebration in 1989. It is home to a 57-rank Casavant organ with 2,600+ pipes. Theatre Converse puts on several plays a year, and Converse puts on an opera annually, as well as opera scenes. The university has had major concerts in recent years with such artists as Caedmon's Call, Jason Mraz, Corey Smith, and Colbie Caillat.
- Hub City Writers Project, serves the community as a local publishing company and independent bookstore.
- Spartanburg County Public Library headquarters, housed in an innovative building on South Church Street, is home to a voluminous collection of fiction, nonfiction, children's literature, A/V materials and items relating to local history and genealogy. The library hosts many meetings, concerts and presentations. The County Librarian is Todd Stephens.
- Spartanburg Memorial Auditorium is on N. Church Street, across from the municipal building in the northwest end of the city. The "SMA" has hosted acts such as Bob Dylan, Crosby Stills and Nash, B.B. King, Billy Joel, David Copperfield, Lewis Grizzard, Harry Connick, Jr., Gerald Levert, Dave Chappelle, Jerry Seinfeld, Phish, and A Prairie Home Companion. Originally built in an Art Deco style, it was renovated c. 2002 including a new facade and backstage with loading area.
- Wofford College, liberal arts college. Not traditionally known for its arts and cultural strength, Wofford has made notable strides to develop arts programs in recent years. Poet and environmental writer John E. Lane, theater artist Mark Ferguson, and visual artist Kris Neely are all graduates of Wofford. Each returned to their alma mater to develop curricular and co-curricular opportunities in the Arts, including a Creative Writing program, a Theatre major, and a minor in Studio Art. John Lane was also a critical visionary in the creation of the Goodall Environmental Studies Center in Glendale.

=== Points of interest ===
- Cottonwood Trail, a walking trail in the Edwin M. Griffin Nature Preserve, runs along part of Lawson's Fork Creek. The trail includes picnic areas, a raised path over an extensive wetlands area and access to sporadic sandbars. Just east of downtown, it is used frequently by cyclists, joggers and walkers. Since the Lawson's Fork floodplain is not suitable for development, wildlife populate the area. Larger animals found here include white-tailed deer, raccoons, wild turkeys, pileated woodpeckers, mallard ducks, Canada geese, and snapping turtles.
- Hampton Heights Historic District, the city's oldest intact downtown neighborhood, is a few blocks south of Morgan Square. Architectural styles in this neighborhood range from large Queen Anne and Neoclassical homes to cozy early 20th-century bungalows.
- Hatcher Garden and Woodland Preserve is in the midst of an urban environment. Retired social activist Harold Hatcher and his wife Josephine transformed an eroding gully into a thick woods and flower garden that now provides a haven for birds and other wildlife.

Early European settlers to this area included French fur trappers, English woodsmen, and Scots-Irish farmers. Few remnants survive from these early pioneering days, but traces can be found in the more rural areas of the county.

- Lawson's Fork Creek, a tributary of the Pacolet River, was once known for its plentiful wildlife and crystal clear waters. Parks and woodlands line much of its banks (which lie entirely within Spartanburg County), and rocky shoals and natural waterfalls can be found throughout its course. It stretches from the northern end of the county to the eastern end, where it empties into the Pacolet River.
- Jammie Seay House, another 18th-century home, is a more typical representative of a pioneer home. Its single stone fireplace and simple construction were common traits of farmsteads from this period.

First established in the 1780s as a courthouse village, Spartanburg may have been named for the Spartan regiment of the South Carolina militia. The city was incorporated in 1831, at the time of the 50th anniversary of the Battle of Cowpens, a pivotal fight of the American Revolution that took place only a few miles away. The city's streets and architectural record reflect the changes of the 19th and 20th centuries.

- Magnolia Street Train Depot, one of the older buildings in Spartanburg, stands as a reminder of Spartanburg's old nickname "the Hub City," referring to the many transportation routes that connected Spartanburg with cities throughout the region. It is now the home of the Amtrak station, the Hub City Railroad Museum, and the Hub City Farmers' Market.
- Morgan Square, the city's primary downtown hub, is the original courthouse village. It was founded adjacent to a small spring (now underground) on the western slope of a ridge, which forms the border of the Tyger and Pacolet River watersheds. The square's name derives from Daniel Morgan, the general who commanded the American forces at Cowpens. A statue of Morgan was placed in the square in 1881. The oldest existing buildings on Morgan Square date to the 1880s.
- The Price House, the third 18th-century home maintained by the Historical Association, is unique. Its sturdy Flemish-bond brick construction and three stories are less common in this area. By carefully examining the original inventory lists of the house, the Historical Association has been able to retrieve period pieces that approximate the original contents of the house.
- Walnut Grove Plantation, an 18th-century farmhouse, has been preserved by the Spartanburg County Historical Association. The site of a locally famous skirmish during the American Revolutionary War, it was the home of the Moore family. The plantation lies south of Spartanburg near the town of Roebuck, and is open to the public for tours and during annual festivals.

Cotton mills have abounded in the Spartanburg area since 1816, earning Spartanburg the reputation as the "Lowell of the South." Although there were few mills in the area before the Civil War, technological advances, northern capital, and out-migration from the poor farms that made white labor available, created a wave of postbellum mill development here and in much of the Piedmont South. Additionally, the abundant streams and rivers in the area are just beginning their descent towards the lower-lying Midlands region. In many places, these waterways descend abruptly, providing a source for plentiful waterpower. Cotton mills were built along these rivers to harness this power, and so began the region's servitude to King Cotton. These mills, their owners and their slaves dominated the politics and economy of the region for nearly a century. Although nearly all abandoned, many mills remain along the riverbanks, the Piedmont equivalent of Gothic ruins.

- Beaumont Mill, north of the downtown area, was purchased by Spartanburg Regional Healthcare, who moved their billing, human resources, and medical records to the 180,000-square-foot (17,000 m^{2}) mill. The adjacent mill village has been designated as a local historic district.
- Converse Mill is east of the city along the Pacolet River. It has been purchased by a developer. The mill was reconstructed in 1903 after a huge flood washed away the original mill. The dam is still in use by Converse Energy Inc as a hydroelectric plant.

The old bridge and millpond at Glendale. The mill itself (background) has since burned.

- Glendale Mill is off Lawson's Fork Creek, southeast of the city. Although gutted by fire in 2004, a few towers and smokestacks remain, providing a dramatic backdrop to the dam, shoals and waterfalls of the creek below. The former company store now serves as the home of the Wofford College Environmental Studies Center. The Glendale Shoals bridge will be getting a $600,000 makeover, and will ultimately connect to the state's Palmetto Trail.

When the US entered World War I in 1917, one of the 16 divisional cantonments for the training of National Guard troops was Camp Wadsworth, which is in the vicinity of Westgate Mall. Many New York National Guardsmen and Southern troops trained there. During World War II, Camp Croft, south of the city, trained Army recruits. This is now a South Carolina state park with the same name. Some parts of the park contain the original quonset huts.

=== Attractions ===
- Dickens of a Christmas, Victorian holiday event held annually in downtown Spartanburg on the Tuesday after Thanksgiving
- The Greek Festival is a major street festival that is held in September by the local Greek community at St. Nicholas Greek Orthodox Church. It offers Greek food and cultural activities, and is the sister festival to the Greek Festival held every spring in Greenville.
- Festifall, an historical celebration held on the grounds of the 18th-century Walnut Grove Plantation in October, featuring demonstrations and reenactments
- The Hotspot Skatepark
- The Hub City Farmers Market, outdoor market held Saturday mornings 8:00am – 12:00pm from April to December at Harvest Park in the Northside neighborhood, showcasing local (often organic) produce and goods
- The Hub City Hog Fest, annual barbecue festival and competition that benefits Mobile Meals. It is held in the heart of downtown Spartanburg with food trucks, over 40 BBQ teams, and two days of live music.
- Hub City Railroad Museum
- The International Festival, event showcasing culture and cuisine from countries around the globe held at Barnet Park on the first Saturday in October
- Music on Main, street concert event held every Thursday (April through August) in downtown Spartanburg
- Spartanburg Music Trail, with a series of signs throughout downtown recognizing local musicians
- Red, White and Boom, Fourth of July event held at Barnet Park featuring patriotic music and a fireworks display
- Taste of the Backcountry, historical celebration held on the grounds of the 18th-century Price House in April, featuring food samples and demonstrations

== Sports ==
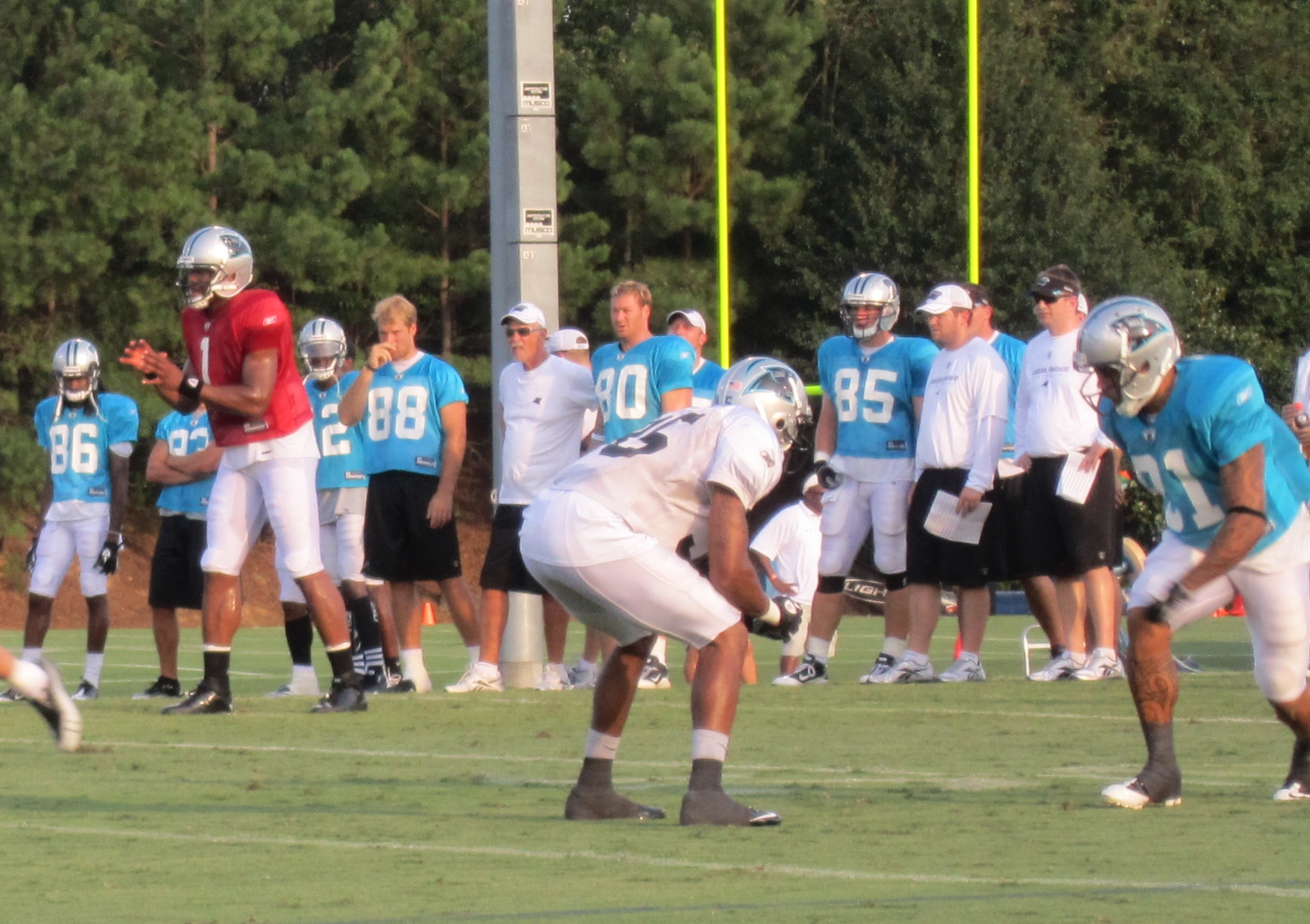
Quarterback Cam Newton and the Carolina Panthers participate in training camp at Wofford College in 2011.

Spartanburg formerly hosted the NFL's Carolina Panthers training camp each year on the campus of Wofford College from 1995 to 2023. The Panthers moved their training camp to Charlotte in 2024.

Duncan Park Stadium is one of the oldest baseball stadiums in the country. It was once home to the Spartanburg Stingers in the Coastal Plain League (CPL) and the Spartanburg Crickets in the Southern Collegiate Baseball League. It was also once home to the Spartanburg Peaches, a minor league affiliate of the Cleveland Indians and the Spartanburg Phillies, a minor league team of the Philadelphia Phillies. It now is the home stadium for the baseball teams of Spartanburg High School. In 2021, it was the home field for the Spartanburgers in the CPL.

The Shrine Bowl of the Carolinas is held each year at Wofford's Gibbs Stadium. It is a high school football all-star game played between the top players from South Carolina and the top players from North Carolina.

The USC Upstate Spartans, Spartanburg Methodist College Pioneers, Wofford College Terriers, and Converse University Valkyries offer a variety of sports for both men and women. The Southern Conference is also headquartered in Spartanburg.

The city hosts the Spartanburg Criterium. The criterium is a yearly event and is usually one of the events associated with Speed Week which is part of the USA Crits bicycle racing series. The event is billed as the “fastest night in Spartanburg”.

Upward Sports, a Christian-based sports organization for kids, is headquartered in Spartanburg.

The Down East Wood Ducks baseball team of the Carolina League moved to the newly-built Fifth Third Park in downtown Spartanburg in April 2025. The team was renamed the Hub City Spartanburgers and currently play as the High A affiliate of the Texas Rangers in the South Atlantic League

Boiling Springs FC, a semiprofessional soccer team of the United Premier Soccer League, began play in 2024.

== Government ==
The current mayor, Jerome Rice, was elected in 2021. Spartanburg operates under a city manager form of government in which the mayor and six city council members have equal votes. Council members represent districts within the city, and the mayor is elected at large. The council appoints a city manager, who is responsible for the daily administration of city governmental affairs.

City Hall was once at 145 West Broad Street, but that building was demolished, and the city offices are now at 187 West Broad Street while a joint government complex for the city and county offices is under construction. The city council meets on the second and fourth Monday of the month at the Spartanburg County Administration Building.

The Spartanburg County Administration Building (the old Sears building which was vacated in the mid-1970s when Sears moved to Westgate Mall and renovated in the late 1980s or early 1990s) is at 366 North Church Street, across the street from the Spartanburg Memorial Auditorium.

== Education ==
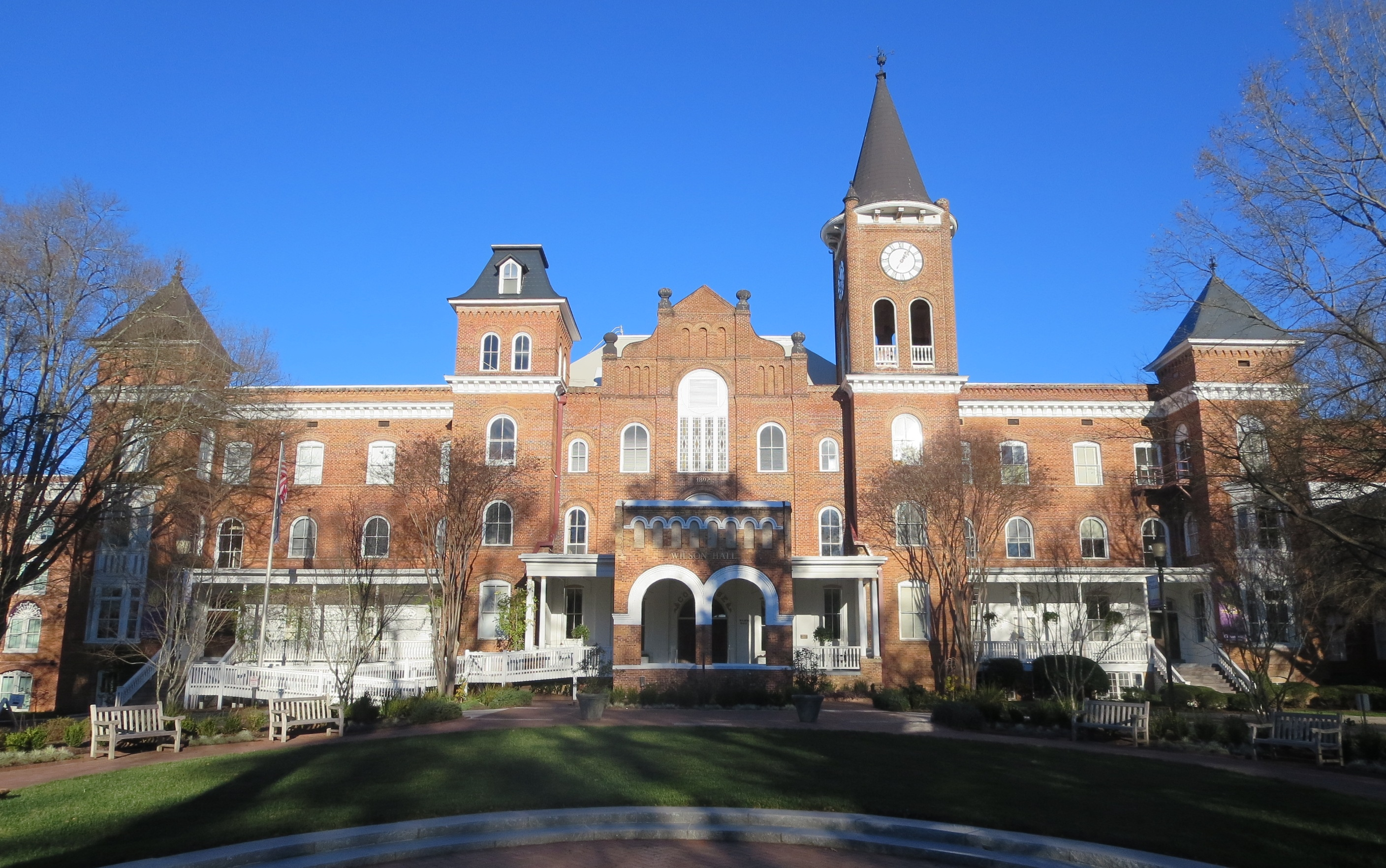
Wilson Hall at Converse University

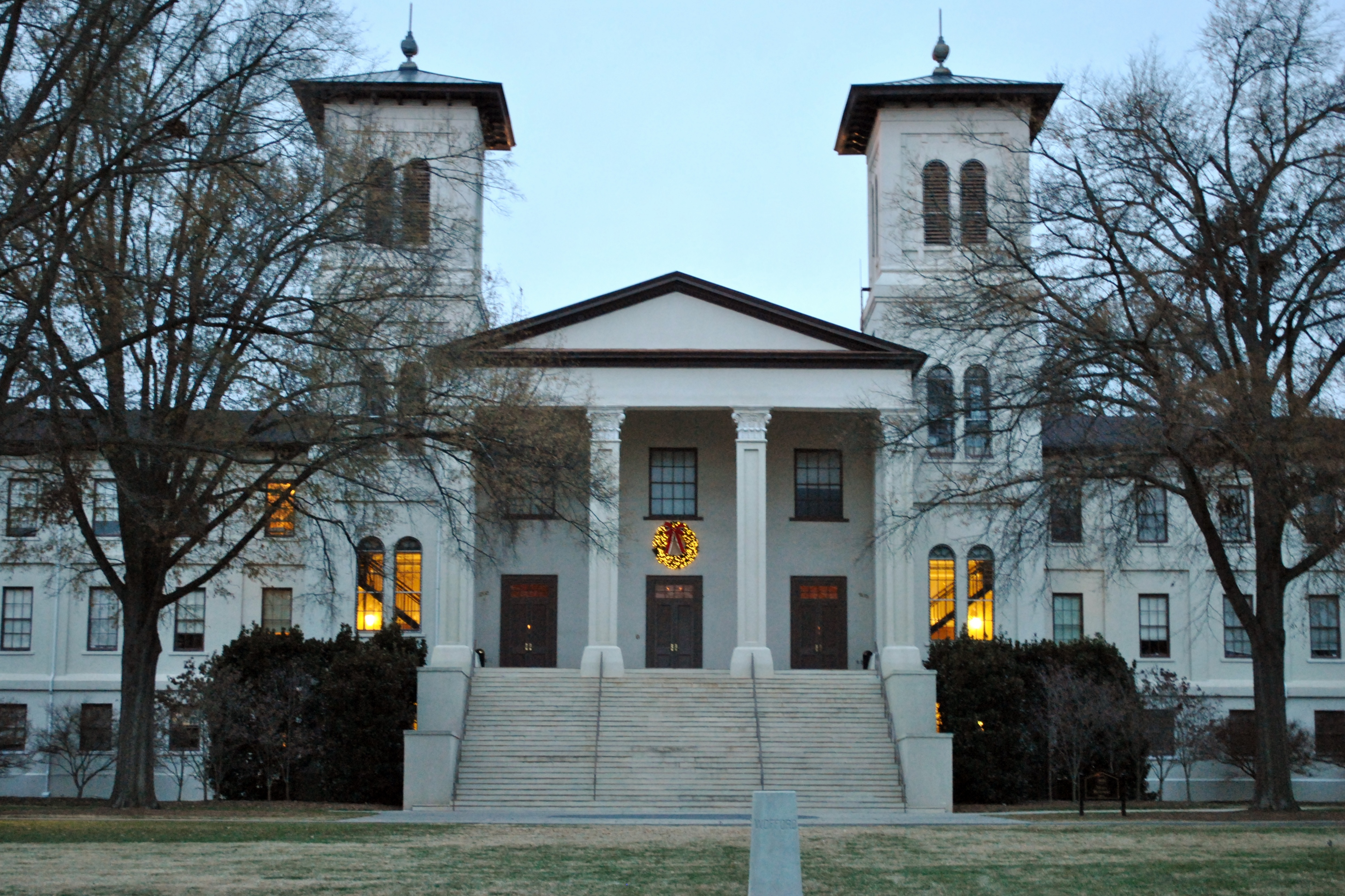
Old Main at Wofford College

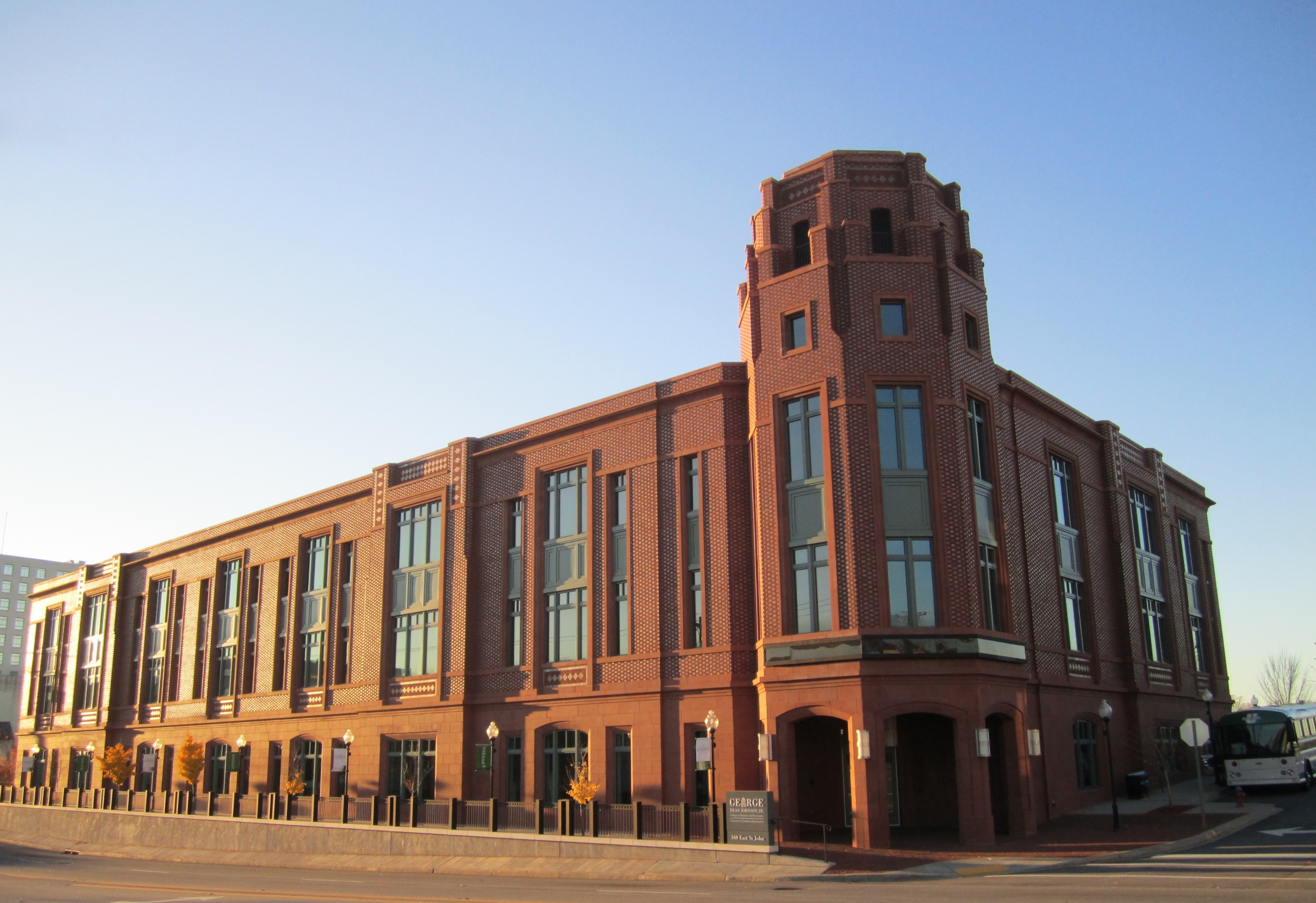
USC Upstate's Johnson College of Business and Economics downtown

=== Colleges and universities ===
Spartanburg is a college town, with four institutions of higher learning within the city limits:

- Spartanburg Community College Downtown Campus
- Converse University, founded in 1889, a comprehensive doctoral institution
- Edward Via College of Osteopathic Medicine, Carolinas Campus, first classes began in fall 2011
- Wofford College, founded in 1854, a Phi Beta Kappa liberal arts college with an enrollment of approximately 1,500 students

In the area:

- The University of South Carolina Upstate (formerly known as University of South Carolina Spartanburg, or USCS), in Valley Falls
- Spartanburg Community College Spartanburg (Giles) Campus (main campus), in Southern Shops
- Spartanburg Methodist College in Saxon (known as the Textile Industrial Institute from 1911 to 1942, then as Spartanburg Junior College until 1974). Originally South Carolina's only two-year residential college, it now offers several four-year programs.
- Sherman College of Chiropractic, South Carolina's only chiropractic college

=== Public and private schools ===
Most of the City of Spartanburg's public schools are run by Spartanburg County School District 7, one of seven loosely affiliated districts in Spartanburg County. District 7 students are zoned to Spartanburg High School, but the westernmost part of the city is served by Spartanburg County School District 6, which has two elementary schools within city limits. District 6 students are zoned to Paul M. Dorman High School in Roebuck.

The Spartanburg area is home to the main campus of the South Carolina School for the Deaf and the Blind, which is outside of the city limits in an unincorporated area. It has five Regional Outreach Centers throughout the state. The city is also home to Spartanburg Preparatory School, a K–8 public charter school that is the only "brick and mortar" charter school in the Upstate.

Spartanburg is also home to Spartanburg Christian Academy, a K–12 private school in North Spartanburg, the Spartanburg Day School, a K–12 private school offering the International Baccalaureate in grades K–4, and to Oakbrook Preparatory and Westgate Christian schools, both K–12 private schools. The Montessori Academy of Spartanburg, in Hampton Heights, is a PreK-8 private school providing a Montessori educational approach. The Meeting Street Academy in downtown Spartanburg is a branch of a Charleston-based private school and offers Pre-K and kindergarten.

St. Paul the Apostle Catholic School is in downtown Spartanburg. It is affiliated with the Roman Catholic Diocese of Charleston and is K–8.

== Media ==
- The Post and Courier of Charleston operates a bureau in Spartanburg and publishes a Spartanburg e-edition and Spartanburg news online. A free joint print edition from both the Greenville and Spartanburg bureaus is published monthly, usually on the fourth Thursday of the month.
- The Spartan Weekly News has offices in downtown Spartanburg. The paper covers all of Spartanburg County with an emphasis on the city of Spartanburg, and its coverage focuses on items of community interest and well as news from around the upstate of South Carolina.
- Spartanburg Herald-Journal, owned by Gannett, is Spartanburg's primary newspaper. The Herald-Journal also publishes Spartanburg magazine four times per year.
- The Woodruff Times publishes online.
- The Greer Citizen published online and weekly in print from 1918 until closing at the end of July 2024.

Spartanburg is part of the much greater Greenville-Spartanburg-Anderson-Asheville DMA which is the nation's 37th largest in the country and is served by the following major television affiliates:

- WYFF 4 (NBC, with CBS on DT3), broadcasting from Greenville
- WSPA 7 (The CW), broadcasting from Spartanburg
- WLOS 13 (ABC, with MyNetworkTV on DT2), broadcasting from Asheville but also from Anderson
- WGGS 16 (Religious Independent) broadcasting from Greenville
- WHNS 21 (Fox), broadcasting from Greenville
- WMYA 40 (Roar), transmitting from Anderson
- WYCW 62 (Independent), licensed to Asheville but broadcasting and transmitting from Spartanburg

== Infrastructure ==
=== Transportation ===
==== Major highways ====
- I-26
- I-85
- I-85 BL
- I-585
- US 29
- US 176
- US 221
- SC 9
- SC 56
- SC 129
- SC 215
- SC 295
- SC 296

==== Public transit ====
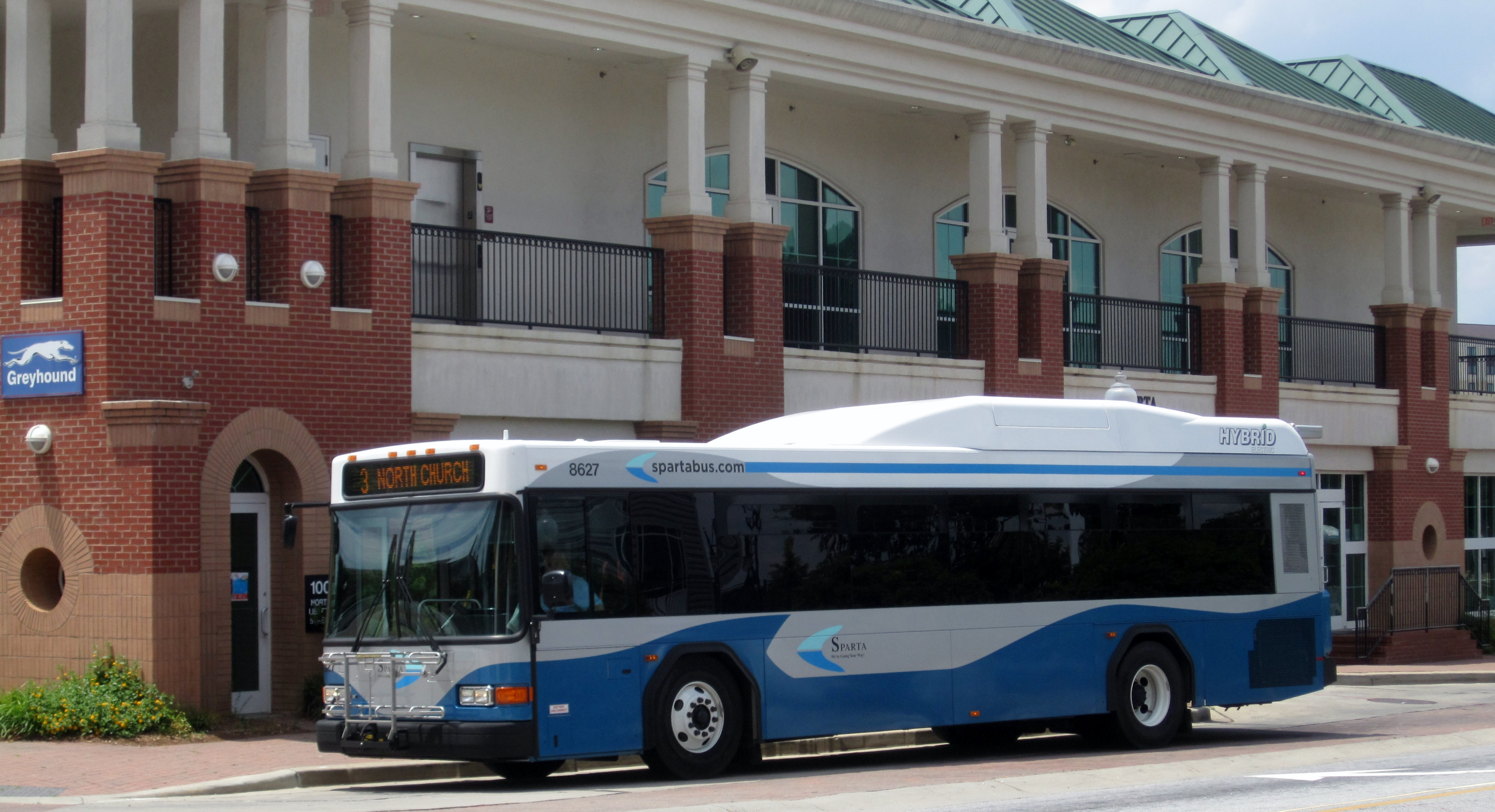
A hybrid SPARTA bus at the downtown Passenger Center

Spartanburg is served by the Spartanburg Area Regional Transit Agency (SPARTA), covering the city of Spartanburg and the surrounding urbanized area with eight routes leading to a wide variety of destinations. All SPARTA buses are equipped with bicycle racks. Two hybrid-electric buses were added to the fleet in 2012. The SPARTA Passenger Center is at 100 North Liberty Street and also serves Greyhound buses.

Mass Transit is provided to all citizens of Spartanburg County through Spartanburg County Dial-A-Ride. It is a door to door service that operates six days a week.

==== Active transportation ====
Spartanburg is home to the Daniel Morgan Trail System, or "the Dan" for short, a 55-mile (89 km) collaboration between Spartanburg County Parks, the City of Spartanburg, non-profit PAL, and other community partners. The system consists of paved and unpaved pathways, along with expanded sidewalks and protected bicycle travel lanes. The Hub City Hopper, a fully protected bicycle lane going through the city's downtown that is described as a first of its kind in South Carolina, was named as the sixth best new U.S. bike lane in 2023 by PeopleForBikes. The system is likely to grow in the coming years.

==== Airports ====
The Greenville-Spartanburg International Airport (GSP) lies mostly in suburban Greer, and it serves Greenville as well as Spartanburg. It has become one of the busiest airports in South Carolina.

The Spartanburg Downtown Memorial Airport (SPA) is a general aviation/small craft airport owned and operated by the City, which lies southwest of town.

==== Railroad station ====
Amtrak's Crescent train connects Spartanburg with the cities of New York, Philadelphia, Baltimore, Washington, Greensboro, Charlotte, Atlanta, Birmingham and New Orleans. The Amtrak station is situated at 290 Magnolia Street.

=== Healthcare ===
Spartanburg County's healthcare is mainly provided by Spartanburg Regional Healthcare System. Spartanburg Regional is a public, not-for-profit, integrated health care delivery system with several facilities in Spartanburg, including:

- Spartanburg Medical Center (SMC), a research and teaching hospital with two locations: Spartanburg Medical Center campus on East Wood Street and Spartanburg Medical Center — Mary Black Campus on Skylyn Drive. Together, these campuses share a history that stretches back to the 1920s. Spartanburg Medical Center includes a total of 747 beds, and services that include emergency, surgical, maternity, cancer, a Heart Center and inpatient rehabilitation.
- Spartanburg Hospital for Restorative Care (SHRC), a 97-bed long-term, acute-care hospital with a 25-bed skilled nursing facility.
- Gibbs Cancer Center & Research Institute, providing an inpatient oncology unit and outpatient care, along with access to clinical trials and the latest cancer technology.
- Bearden-Josey Center for Breast Health, a state-of-the-art imaging center for digital mammography, ultrasound, stereotactic breast biopsy and bone densitometry.
- Medical Group of the Carolinas, a physician group with offices throughout Spartanburg and Upstate South Carolina.

== Notable people ==
- Ted Alexander (1912–1999), baseball pitcher in Negro leagues
- Pink Anderson (1900–1974), blues musician; inspiration for the "Pink" in Pink Floyd
- Rudolf Anderson (1927–1962), United States Air Force pilot, first recipient of the Air Force Cross
- Norman C. Armitage (1907, as Norman Cudworth Cohn–1972), Olympic medalist saber fencer who lived in Spartanburg; namesake of the Milliken company plant in Spartanburg County
- David Ball (born 1953), country musician
- Joe Bennett (1940–2015), lead singer and guitarist from the 1950s rock 'n roll band Joe Bennett and the Sparkletones
- Ted Bogan (1909–1990), country blues guitarist, singer and songwriter
- Red Borom (1915–2011), Major League Baseball infielder for Detroit Tigers
- Emma L. Bowen (1814–1996), healthcare and media activist
- Earl Bramblett (1942−2003), mass murderer
- Roger Brent (born 1955), biologist known for work on gene regulation and systems biology
- Mike Bullman (born 1952/1953), bandleader, lead singer and guitarist with Jesters III
- Benjamin O. Burnett (1937−2017), member of the South Carolina House of Representatives
- James Francis Byrnes (1882–1972), lawyer, congressman, senator, Supreme Court justice, advisor to FDR, secretary of state under Truman, governor of South Carolina
- Wilson Casey (born 1954), syndicated newspaper columnist, speaking entertainer, and Guinness World Record holder
- Mark Cerney (born 1967), founder of the Next of Kin Registry
- Marshall Chapman (born 1949), singer-songwriter
- Jeremy Clements (born 1985), racing driver
- Landon Cohen (born 1986), football player, community builder
- Fieldin Culbreth (born 1963), Major League Baseball umpire, Olympian
- David Daniels (born 1966), counter-tenor
- Stephen Davis (born 1974), football running back
- Steven Duggar (born 1993), former baseball player who played for the San Francisco Giants
- Raymond C. Eubanks Jr. (1933–2022), politician representing Spartanburg County in the South Carolina House of Representatives
- Marion Kirkland Fort (1921–1964), mathematician
- Art Fowler (1922–2007), pitcher and pitching coach in Major League Baseball
- Grace Beacham Freeman (1916–2002), poet, columnist, short story writer; South Carolina Poet Laureate 1985–86
- Hank Garland (1930–2004), legendary Nashville guitarist who accompanied Patsy Cline and Elvis
- George Gray (aka One Man Gang, born 1960), pro wrestler
- Fred Griffith (born 1964), actor and film producer
- Mark Hammond (born 1963), South Carolina Secretary of State
- Lee Haney (born 1951), eight-time Mr. Olympia record holder
- Dennis Hayes (born 1950), inventor of the Hayes modem
- Heath Hembree (born 1989), baseball player
- Adam Humphries (born 1993), NFL wide receiver
- Walter Hyatt (1950–1996), country musician and songwriter
- Joseph T. Johnson (1858–1919), U.S. representative from South Carolina
- Todd Kohlhepp (born 1971), serial killer
- Marcus Lattimore (born 1991), football player
- Donald Lawrence (born 1961), gospel artist
- Toney J. Lister (born 1945), member of the South Carolina House of Representatives
- Leigh Magar, (1968–2026), milliner and business owner
- The Marshall Tucker Band, Southern rock band featuring George McCorkle, Doug Gray, Jerry Eubanks, Toy Caldwell, Tommy Caldwell, and Paul Riddle
- Marcus McBeth (born 1980), baseball player
- Ed Johnetta Miller (born 1945), fiber artist
- Roger Milliken (1915–2010), billionaire owner of the largest privately held textile manufacturing firm in the world (Milliken & Company)
- Bud Moore (1925–2017), NASCAR team owner/crew chief
- D. J. Moore (born 1987), football player
- Kris Neely (born 1978), artist and educator
- Samuel J. Nicholls (1885–1937), U.S. representative from South Carolina
- Angela Nikodinov (born 1980), U.S. figure skater
- Cotton Owens (1924–2012), NASCAR team owner/crew chief
- David Pearson (1934–2018), NASCAR champion
- Kitty Black Perkins (born 1948), chief designer of fashions for Barbie, designer of the "first Black Barbie"
- Carson Pickett (born 1993), soccer player
- John W. Pilley (1928–2018), behavioral psychologist known for his research into canine cognition and language learning
- Arthur Prysock (1929–1997), jazz singer
- Betsy Rawls (born 1928), pro golfer, member of World Golf Hall of Fame, born in Spartanburg
- Mike Reid (born 1970), NFL player
- Gianna Rolandi (1952–2021), operatic soprano
- Al "Flip" Rosen (1924–2015), MLB 4-time All-Star third baseman and first baseman, MVP, 2-time home run champion, 2-time RBI leader
- Donald S. Russell (1906–1998), former South Carolina governor, president of the University of South Carolina, U. S. senator, and member of the US 4th Circuit Court of Appeals
- Archibald Rutledge (1883–1973), South Carolina poet laureate, resided in Spartanburg for about 20 years
- Alexander Smalls (born 1952), Grammy, Tony, and James Beard Award winner
- Jack Smith (1924–2001), NASCAR driver
- Carey Wentworth Styles (1825–1997), founder of the Atlanta Constitution
- Gina Tolleson (born 1969), Miss South Carolina USA 1990, First runner-up at Miss USA 1990 and winner of Miss World 1990
- Walter G. Tolleson (1860–1940), western pioneer and rancher who founded Tolleson, Arizona
- Wayne Tolleson (born 1955), baseball player
- Sandra L. Townes (1944–2018), U.S. District Court judge
- Buck Trent (1938–2023), country music instrumentalist who accompanied Porter Wagoner and Dolly Parton
- Ira Tucker (1925–2008), lead singer of the influential gospel group the Dixie Hummingbirds
- William "Singing Billy" Walker (1809–1875), compiler of shape note tunebooks, including The Southern Harmony, and Musical Companion
- Celia Weston (born 1951), actress
- Zion Williamson (born 2000), men's basketball player currently playing for New Orleans Pelicans, and formerly for Duke

== Gallery ==
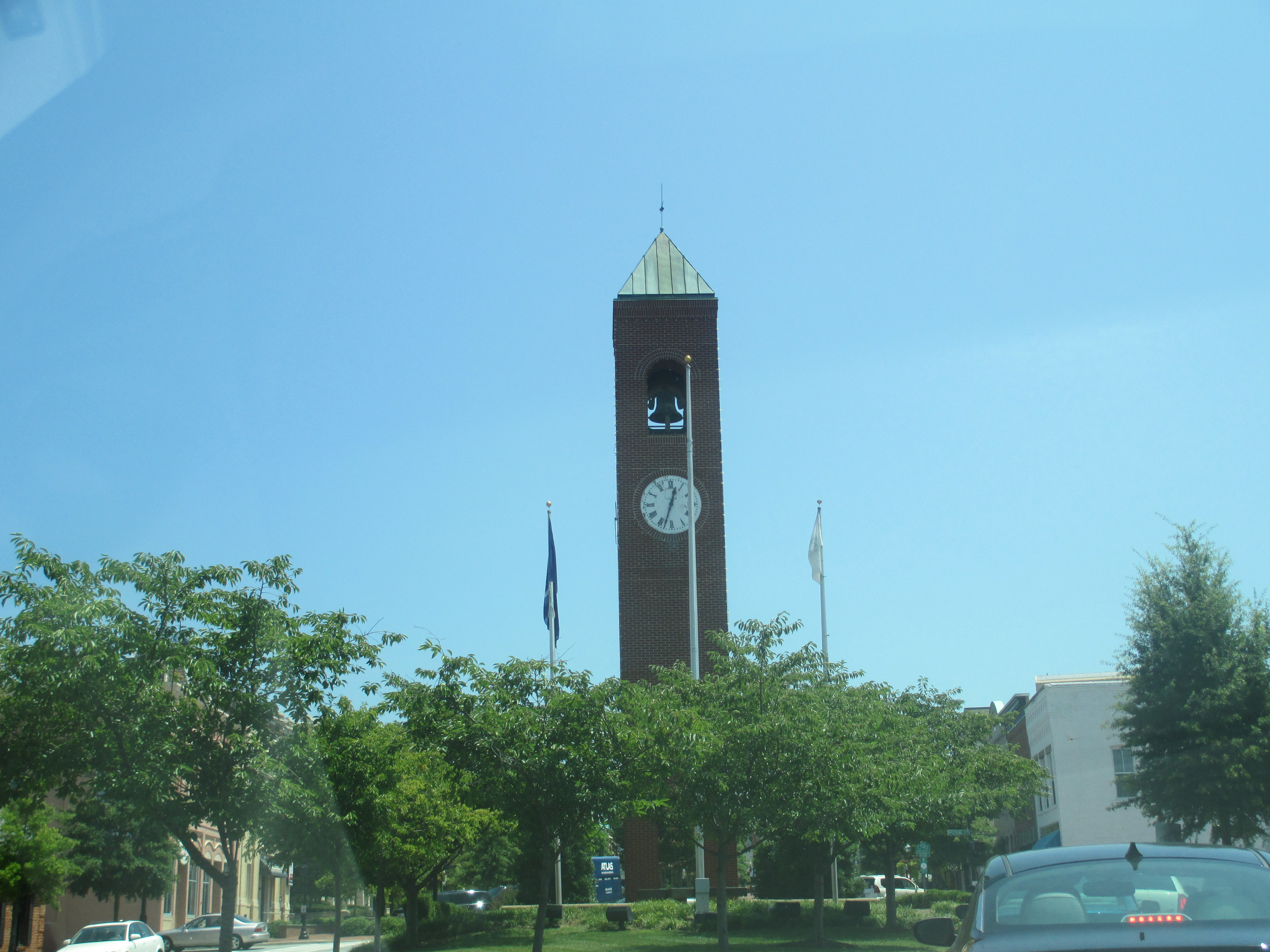
Clock tower

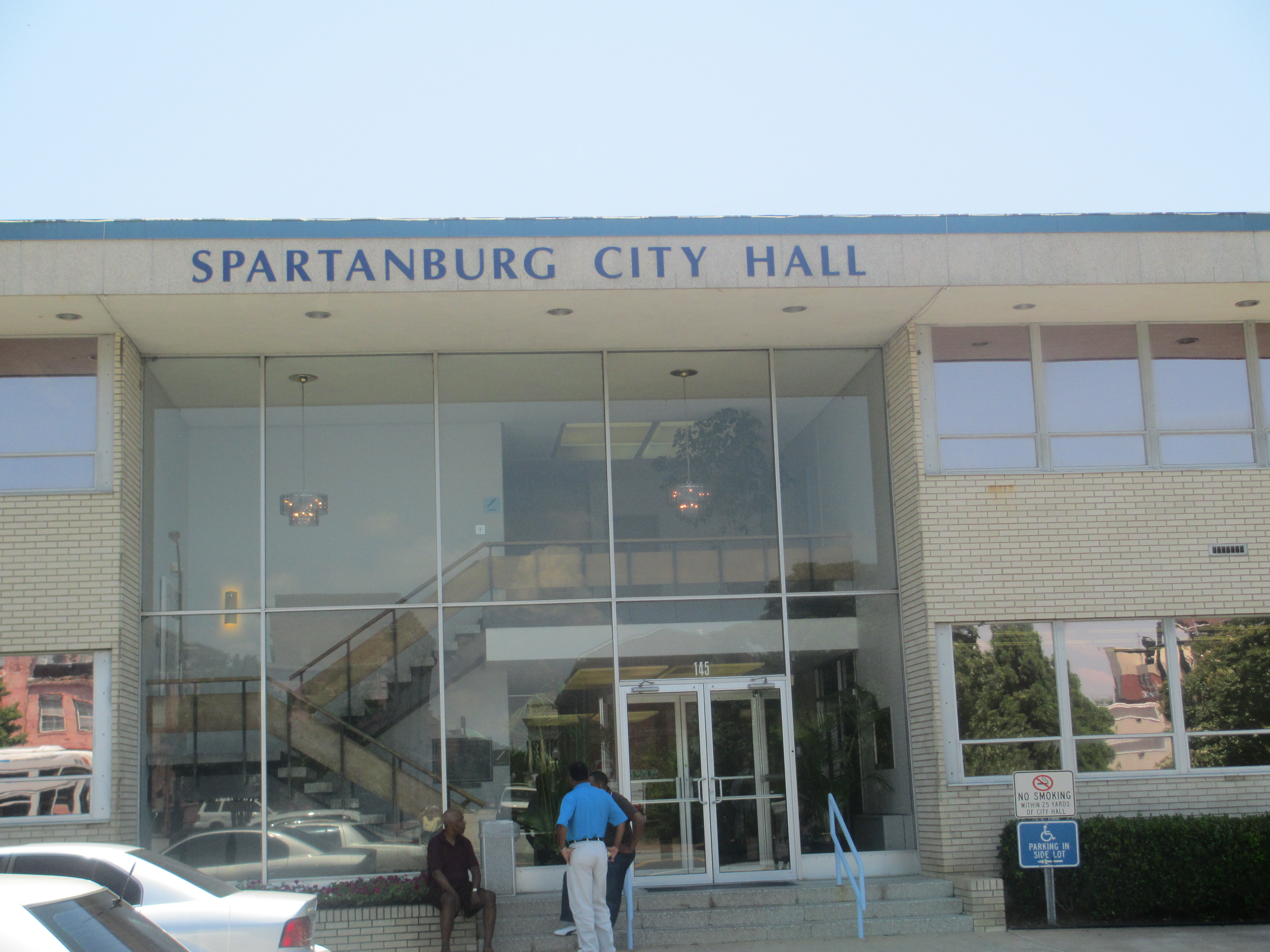
City Hall

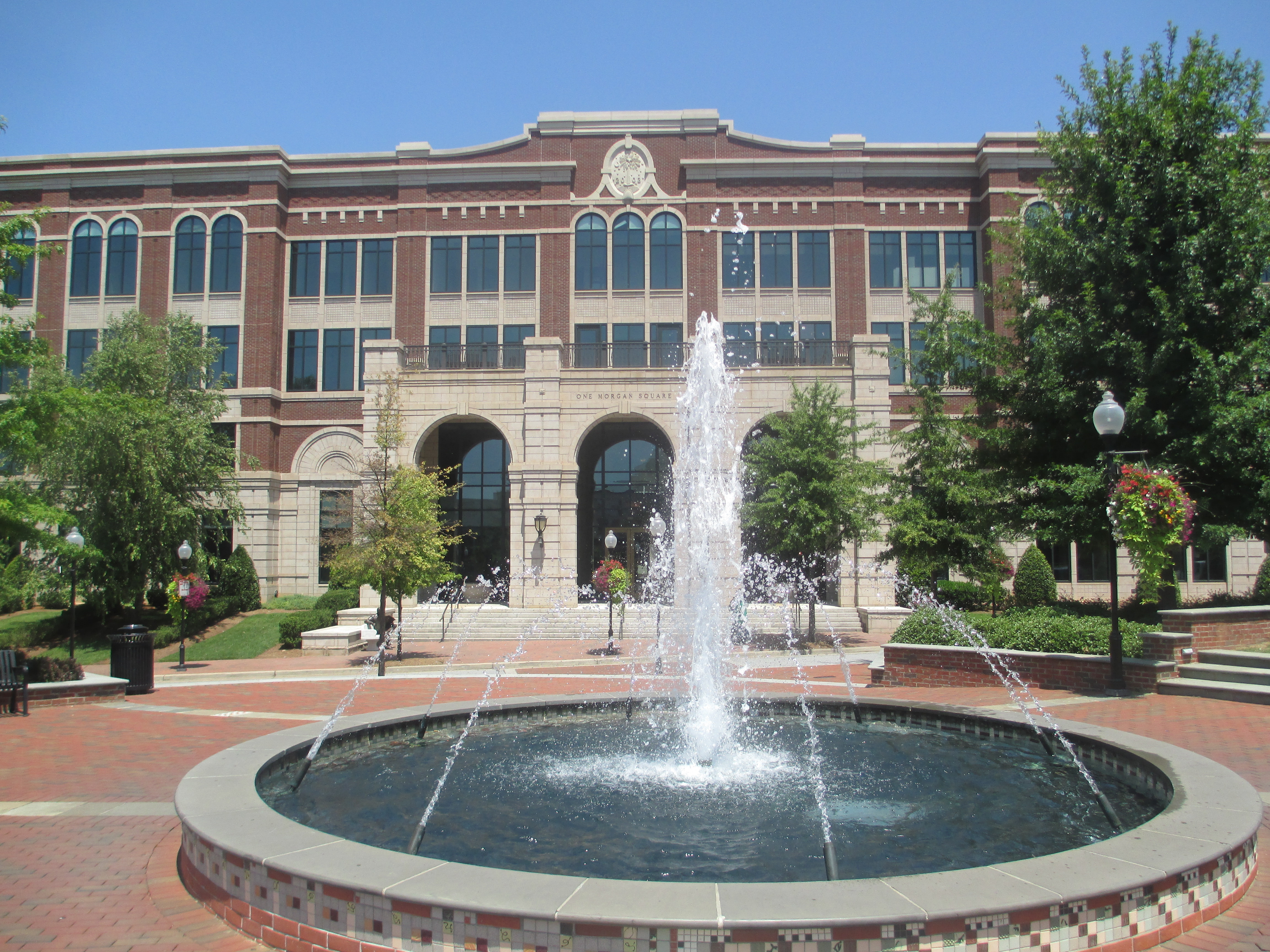
Closeup of Morgan Square fountain

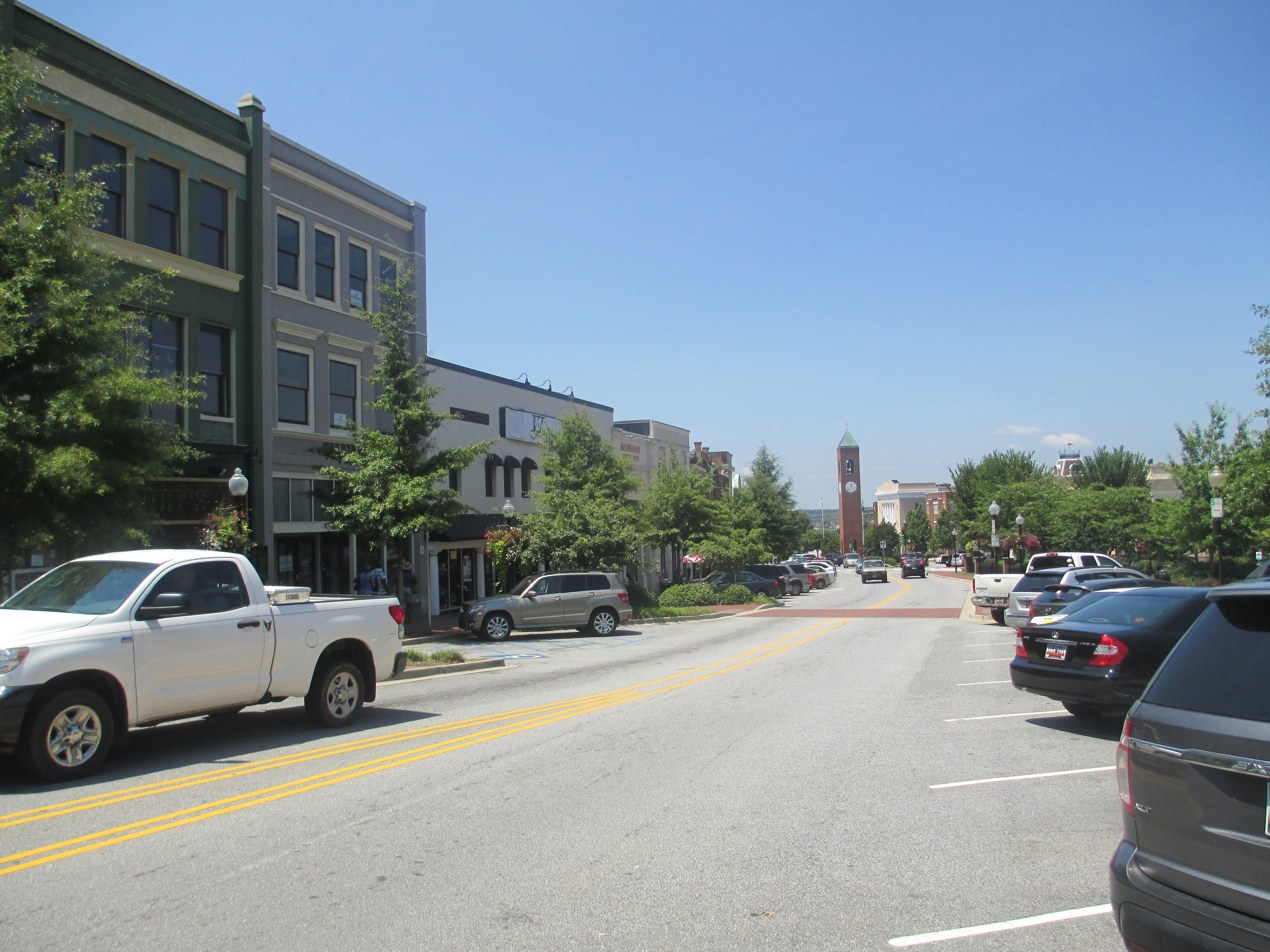
Part of downtown Spartanburg

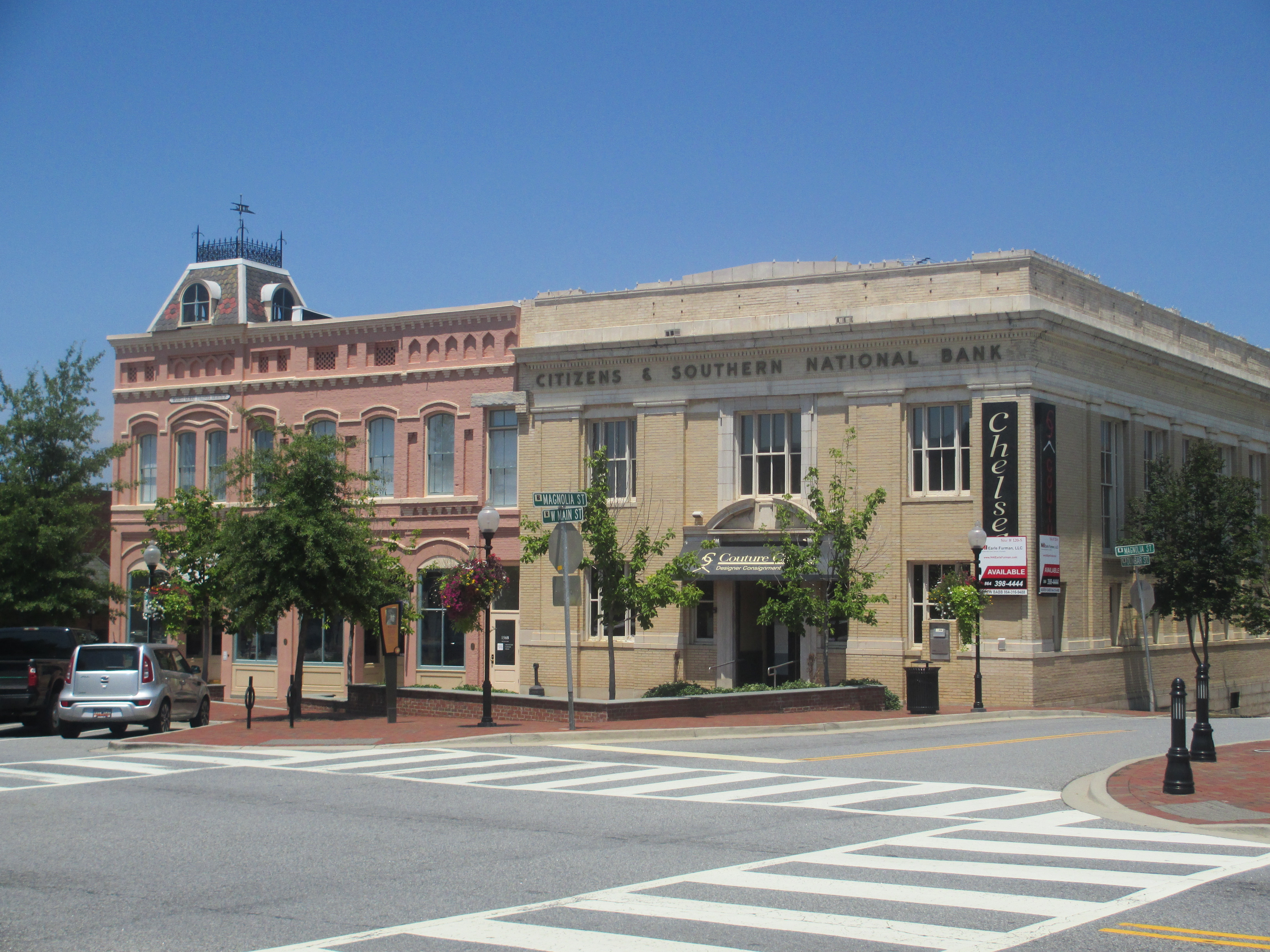
Citizens and Southern National Bank

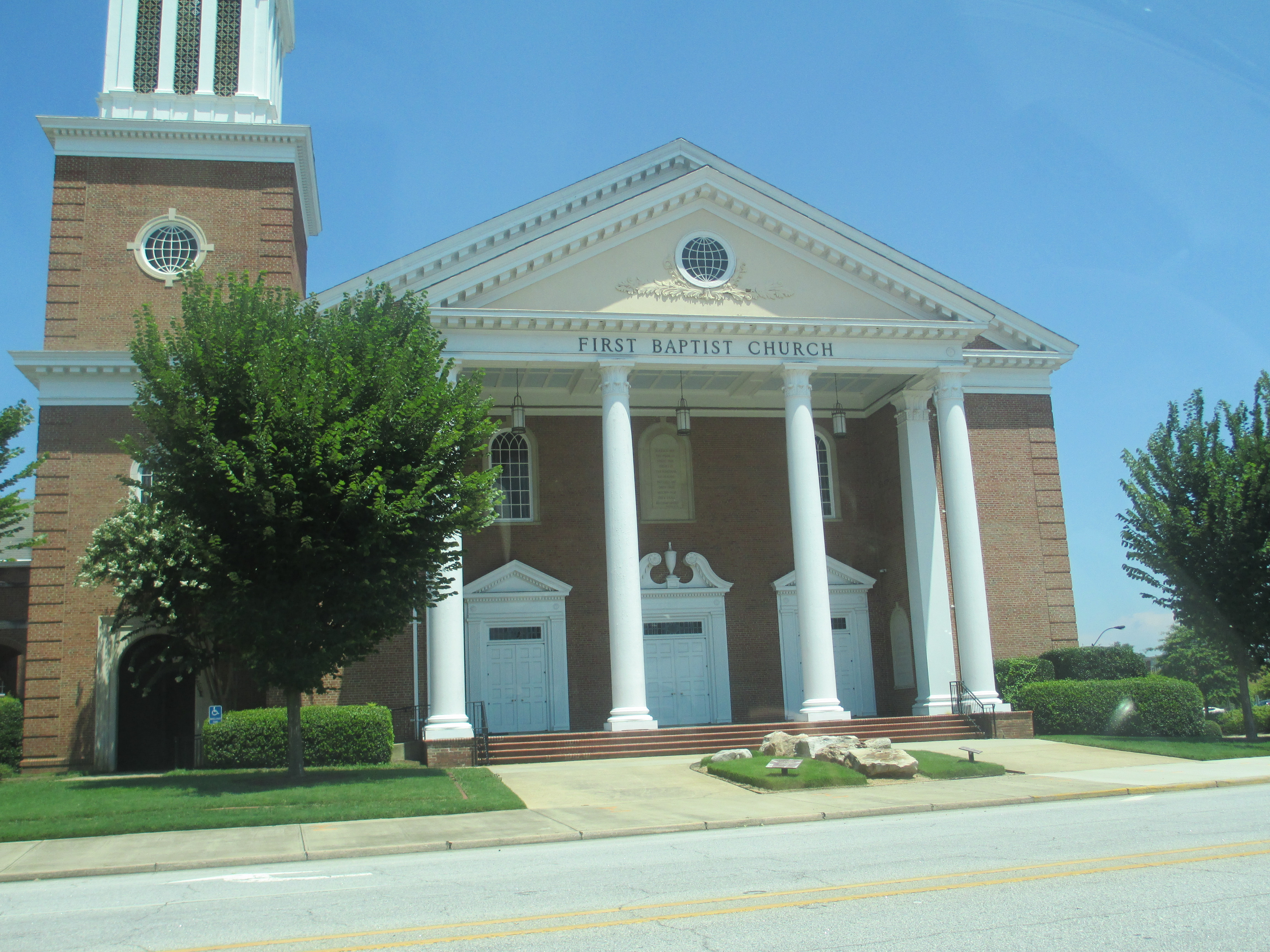
First Baptist Church

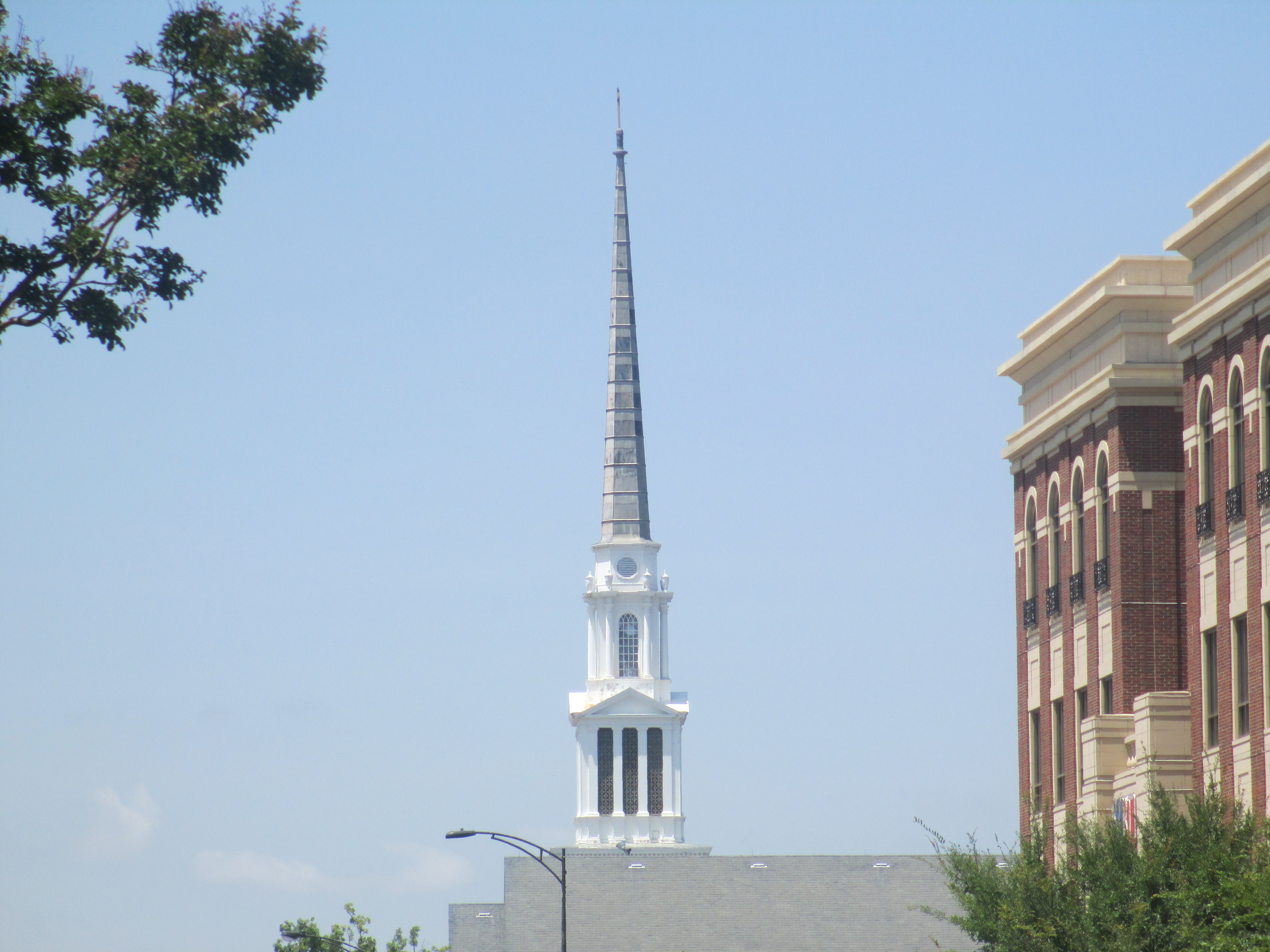
High steeple of First Baptist Church

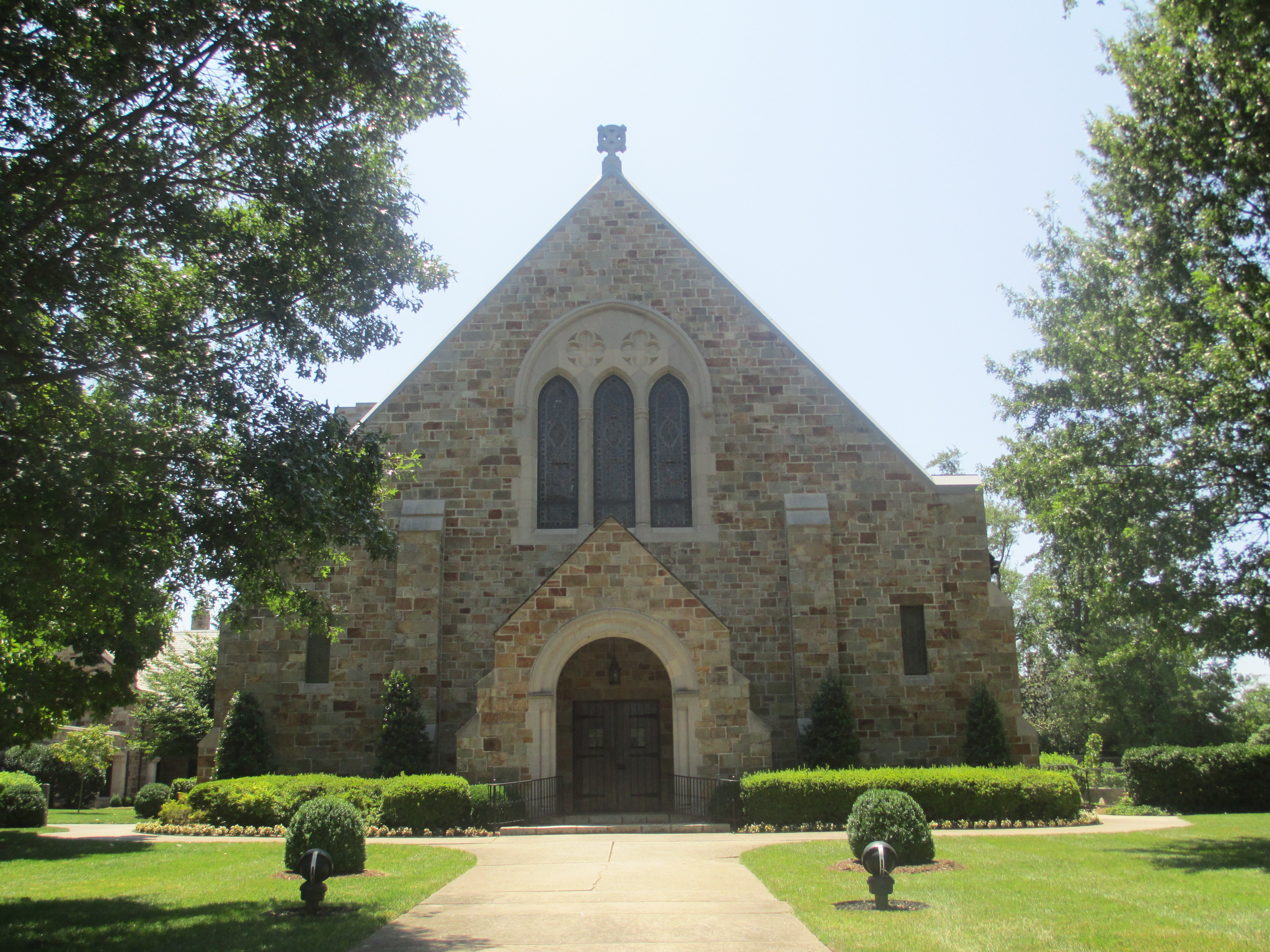
First Presbyterian Church

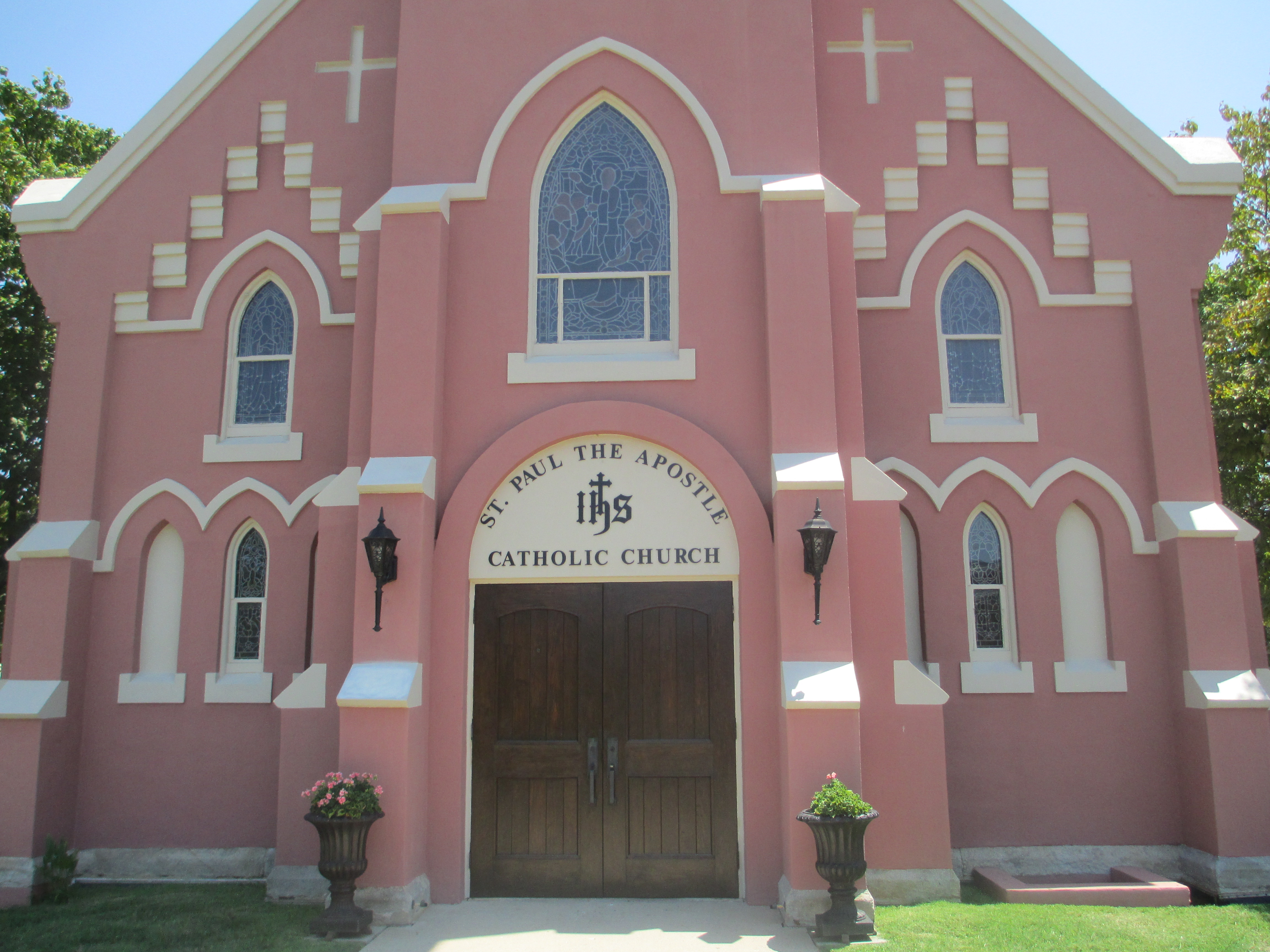
St. Paul the Apostle Catholic Church

== See also ==
- List of municipalities in South Carolina
