= Leigh Magar =

American milliner (1968–2026)

Leigh Magar in 2010

Jennifer Leigh Magar (June 30, 1968 – April 16, 2026) was an American milliner in Charleston, South Carolina, and the owner of Magar Hatworks. She made a range of custom hats from simple fedoras to more elaborate and theatrical ones, such as those worn at the Kentucky Derby. Her work was sold at Barneys and Tokyo retailer Isetan. Her husband, Johnny Tucker, is an architect.

Magar was born on June 30, 1968. She grew up in Spartanburg, South Carolina, and began sculpting in high school. She enrolled in the millinery program at the Fashion Institute of Technology in Manhattan, New York City, where, according to a Food & Wine article, "she financed her studies by working as a live-in housekeeper and assisting Harlem hatmaker Rod Keenan". She moved back to Charleston in 1996. After a while she opened an atelier on upper King Street, producing work for high-end retailers and custom work for locals (and local celebrities like Christina Aguilera and Michael Stipe). She was named women's entrepreneur of 2009 by Country Living. She died at the age of 57 on April 16, 2026, in Kauai, Hawaii, from breast cancer.
