= QS/1 Data Systems =

American software company

QS/1
- Industry: Pharmacy management systems
- Founded: 1944; 82 years ago in Spartanburg, South Carolina
- Founder: James M. Smith, Sr.
- Headquarters: Spartanburg, South Carolina, United States
- Key people: Kraig McEwen, CEO
- Parent: RedSail Technologies
- Website: www.qs1.com

QS/1 is an American software company which develops management software for pharmacies. It was founded in 1944 and is based in Spartanburg, South Carolina.

In 1977, the company recognized healthcare professionals' need for software and hardware packages designed to help provide more efficient and effective care for customers and pharmacy patients. QS/1's first system was the QS/1 Pharmacy System, known as RxCare Plus, and was designed for the independent pharmacy market. QS/1's latest system, known as NRx, has added a more "Windows-like" GUI interface to the RxCare Plus system, continuing to develop easier methods of processing prescriptions.

QS/1 provides products, services, and support to healthcare providers, focusing on software for managing independent retail, long-term care, and outpatient pharmacies, as well as Home Medical Equipment (HME) and Durable Medical Equipment (DME) providers. The company also develops software and offers training and customer support through a network of field offices in North America.

PUBLIQ Software provides software and services for state and local governments, law enforcement departments, judicial offices, municipal utilities, and other offices.

QS/1 is also home to PowerLine, which provides insurance claim-switching services through redundant data centers and networks for transmission to insurance companies. These redundant networks and data centers support prescription, electronic prescription, and credit card transmissions. All traffic to these networks is encrypted between the pharmacy and the insurance company and supports the HIPAA privacy regulations.

In 2018, the company name was changed to Smith Technologies, combining QS/1 with Integra, LLC, based in Anacortes, Washington. The headquarters for Smith Technologies remained in Spartanburg, SC.

On April 1, 2020, Smith Technologies was purchased by Francisco Partners, a private equity firm, and rebranded as RedSail Technologies. The company's headquarters remained in Spartanburg, South Carolina.

In 2019, QS/1 partnered with Therigy, another company specializing in pharmacy software.

== Products ==
- SharpRx - QS/1's next-generation retail pharmacy system
- NRx - Retail pharmacy system
- SystemOne - Home Medical Equipment (HME) / Durable Medical Equipment (DME) system
- MSM - Multi-site management system
- Enterprise - Multiple stores at a corporate location
- IVR - QS/1's interactive voice response
- Point-of-Sale - QS/1's cash management system
- WebConnect - Allows long-term care facilities to submit secure electronic updated patient information and submit refill prescriptions to the pharmacy
- WebRx - Integrated with the NRx system, it offers online prescriptions refills
- Interfaces
