= Fowler Elementary School District =

School district in Phoenix, Arizona

Address
- 1617 South 67th Avenue Phoenix, Arizona, 85043; United States

District information
- Type: Public
- Grades: PreK–8
- NCES District ID: 0403060

Students and staff
- Students: 3,759
- Teachers: 198.7
- Staff: 243.49
- Student–teacher ratio: 18.92

Other information
- Website: www.fesd.org

The Fowler Elementary School District is an elementary school district in southwest Phoenix, Arizona. It serves parts of Phoenix and Tolleson. It operates eight schools and a child care center.

== Schools ==
- Fowler Elementary School
- Sunridge Elementary School
- Sun Canyon Elementary School
- Western Valley Elementary School
- Tuscano Elementary School
- Santa Maria Middle School
- Western Valley Middle School
- Fowler Virtual Academy
- Dr. Marvene Lobato Child Care Center

== Administration ==
The superintendent is Nora Ulloa. As of December, 2023, the school Board consists of 3 members.

- Mrs. Peggy Eastburn-Board President
- Ms. Francisca Montoya-Board Clerk
- Ms. Lisa M. Perez-Board Member
