= Tolleson Elementary School District =

School district in Maricopa County, Arizona

Address
- 9401 West Garfield Street Tolleson, Arizona, 85353; United States

District information
- Type: Public
- Grades: PreK–8
- NCES District ID: 0408490

Students and staff
- Students: 2,827
- Teachers: 156.55
- Staff: 131.47
- Student–teacher ratio: 18.06

Other information
- Website: www.tollesonschools.com

The Tolleson Elementary School District is an elementary school district in Tolleson, Arizona, United States. It operates four schools.

== Elementary schools ==
- Arizona Desert
- Desert Oasis
- Porfirio Gonzales
- Sheely Farms
