= Ed Johnetta Miller =

Woman fiber artist

Ed Johnetta Miller (born 1945) is an American fiber artist and educator born in Spartanburg, South Carolina. Her works have been globally exhibited and are included in collections such as the Nelson Mandela Metropolitan Art Museum, the Wadsworth Atheneum Museum of Art, and the Rocky Mountain Quilt Museum. She is a “notable” member of the Women of Color Quilters Network.

== Personal life ==
Miller has worked as an artist for most of her life, crediting her aunt Dora for encouraging her to pursue fiber arts. After over thirty years working as a weaver, during which she founded the Hartford Artisan Center, she was invited to submit to an exhibition. Carolyn Mazloomi, founder of the Women of Color Quilters Network, encouraged her to continue quilting, which took her art in a new direction.

== Artistic practice ==
Miller has shared that “[j]azz gets [her] into the flow. I am making music with my colors,” which reflects the improvisational nature of her work.

== Exhibitions ==
Miller’s work “Sit-in” was featured in the “Subversive, Skilled, Sublime: Fiber Art by Women” exhibition at the Smithsonian American Art Museum from May 31, 2024, through January 5, 2025. Her machine-quilted work “Rites of Passage II” is in the permanent collection. It uses indigo dye and features batik, silk, and shells.
