= WestGate Mall (South Carolina) =

Coordinates: 34.94828°N 81.93478°W

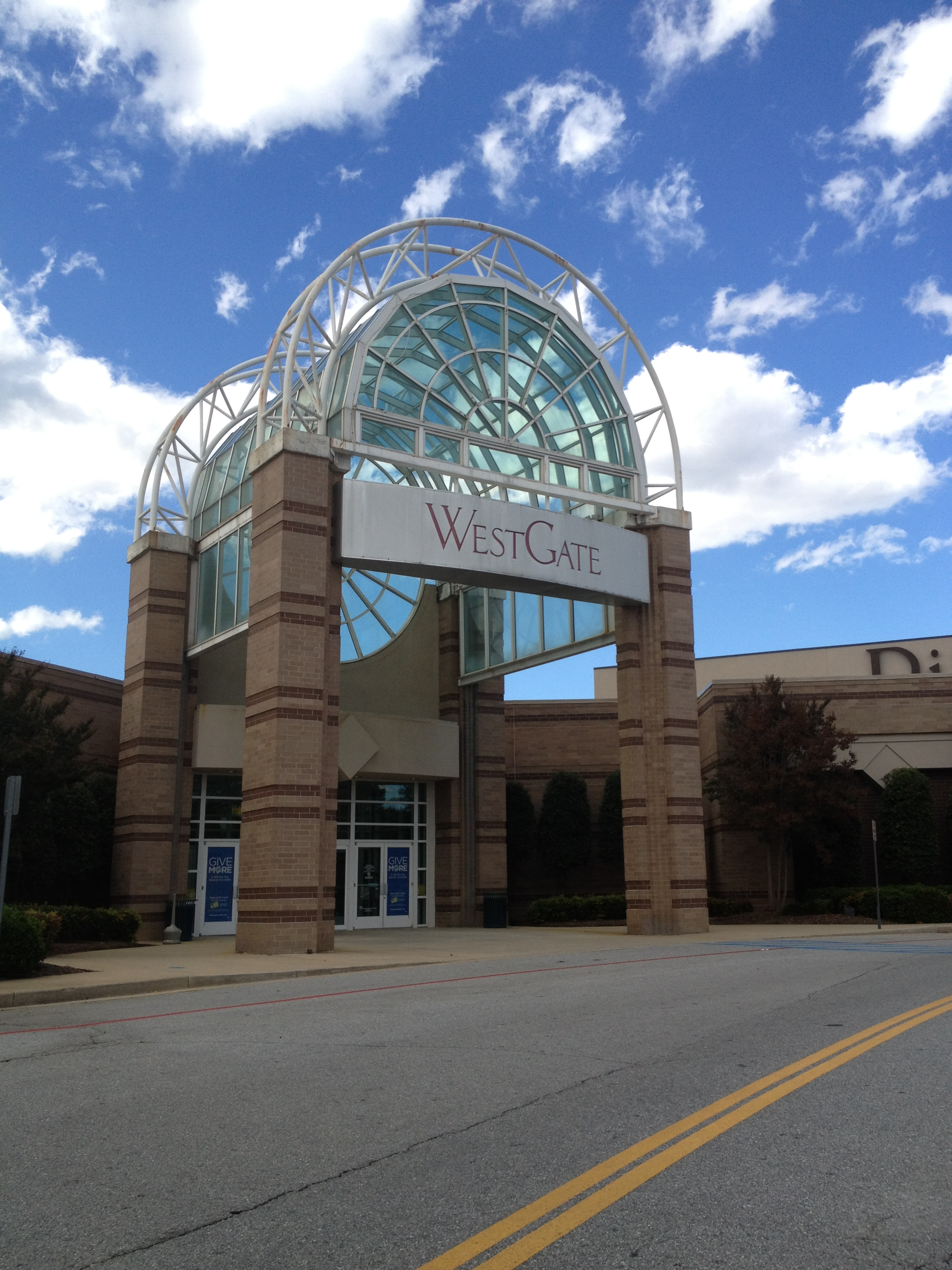
- Entrance to WestGate Mall, October 2012
- Location: Spartanburg, South Carolina, U.S.
- Opened: October 28, 1975; 51 years ago
- Renovated: February 1995
- Developer: Arlen Realty and Development Corporation
- Manager: Namdar Realty Group
- Owner: Namdar Realty Group
- Num. of stores: 110
- Num. of anchor tenants: 7 (6 open, 1 vacant)
- Floor area: 954,302 sq ft (88,657.6 m^{2})
- Floors: 1 with partial upper level (2 in Belk, Dillard's, and Rural King)
- Website: www.westgate-mall.com
- Building details

Renovating team
- Renovating firm: The Rouse Company and CBL Properties

WestGate Mall is a shopping mall in Spartanburg, South Carolina, off Interstate 26 and US Highway 29 on West Blackstock Road in the city's primary shopping market. The regional mall has 954,302 square feet (88,657.6 m^{2}) of retail space and five anchor stores: Belk, Costco, Dillard's, JCPenney, and Rural King. Four of these anchor stores are located within the mall itself. Costco operates on mall property.

== History ==
Westgate Mall was built by Arlen Realty and Development Corporation, and opened on October 28, 1975. At the time, it was the largest mall in South Carolina. Its original anchor stores were Belk-Hudson, Sears, and Meyers-Arnold. JCPenney was added in 1978. It was sold to JMB Realty in the late 1970s, then to Bramalea Centers in 1988. Meyers-Arnold was bought out by Uptons in 1987, thus canceling the latter chain's plans to build a store at nearby Hillcrest Mall.

After Bramalea filed for bankruptcy in 1992, the mall was purchased by CBL & Associates Properties, a successor of Arlen Realty. CBL expanded the mall, adding a new wing that featured Dillard's and J. B. White, as well as a food court and movie theater owned by Regal Entertainment Group. Storefronts within the mall were also upgraded, and the Belk store was expanded by 30,000 square feet. These expansions made the mall the first in the Carolinas to feature six anchors. In 1998, J.B. White's parent company Mercantile Stores was acquired by Dillard's. Dillard's sold this location along with the former Nashville Tennessee Castner Knott to Saks Inc which converted these locations to Proffitt's.

In February 1995, CBL and Columbia-based The Rouse Company renovated and expanded the mall.

Uptons, which purchased the Meyers-Arnold chain in 1987, closed in 1999. As it was less than half the size of the other department stores, the mall's then-manager considered converting the building to either a "junior" department store or several stores. Bed Bath & Beyond opened in half of the former Uptons building in December 2000, with Dick's Sporting Goods filling the other half in mid-2001.

Following the purchase of Proffitt's by Belk in 2005, the fate of the Proffitt's store was originally uncertain due to Belk already having a store in the mall. The Proffitt's store was then closed and demolished for a Costco, which opened in 2007.

On May 31, 2018, it was announced that Sears would be closing as part of a plan to close 72 stores nationwide. The store closed on September 2, 2018. Dick’s Sporting Goods became a clearance center in 2019 and closed in 2021. Bed Bath and Beyond announced its closure in January 2023.

In October 2023, WestGate Mall was put up for sale, nearly 3 years after CBL Properties filed for Chapter 11 bankruptcy. The building was sold to Namdar Realty Group the following year on May 23, 2024.

In 2025, Rural King purchased the long vacant former Sears anchor building with plans to open a store. The store is set to become South Carolina’s first Rural King store. Rural King opened on October 10, 2025 with a grand opening for their store on October 17, 2025.
