= Kris Neely =

American academic (born 1978)

Kristofer M. Neely (born November 21, 1978) is an American creative writer and visual artist in Spartanburg, South Carolina, United States. Neely currently serves as Professor of Art and Director of Interdisciplinary Studies at Spartanburg Methodist College.

Neely is known for his work titled "Guardian Angels," which was painted on pieces of wood that he had found. He has painted more than 10,000 guardians.

Neely is also the owner and creative director of Wet Paint Syndrome Studio which opened in September 2009.

== Education ==
Neely holds a B.A. degree from Wofford College (2002) with a major in religion, graduating summa cum laude, first in his class, Phi Beta Kappa, Presidential International Scholar, and recipient of the Walter E. Hudgins Award for Intellectual Courage, Creativity, and Vision.

Neely earned his Master of Fine Arts (MFA) in Interdisciplinary Art from Goddard College in 2009.

== Guardians ==
In 2005, Neely painted his first "Guardian" painting, a small angel image on found wood, for his mother. He created the painting in memory of his brother Erik Hudson Neely, who died in 2000 from an epileptic seizure. Neely gave his mother a few more of these angel paintings to give to friends. He then began selling them after a business owner in Spartanburg requested 50 of them for their employees. Since then, Neely has been selling the Guardians primarily in the Southern United States, but has had orders from other states and countries.

In 2008, sensing that the Guardians had become knickknacks, Neely stopped selling them for six months, giving them away instead. He sometimes hid them in various locations in the city of Spartanburg for people to find. Neely started selling the Guardians again in. 2009, Criticized that he was creating too many Guardians and selling them too cheaply, Neely responded, "I think any artist would be honored to have a work that can connect with people so powerfully."

“When I’m working on a Guardian, I try to think to myself about what this could mean to the person who receives it,” Neely said. “When I catch myself in a moment of slipping out of that kind of awareness, I’ll just stop. The numbers (of angels he makes) aren’t important; it’s that I focus on the one.”

== Career ==
Neely worked with the Success Initiative program at Wofford College from 2005 until 2010. He served as the Assistant Director of the program before being appointed as the Executive Director in 2007. At Wofford College, Neely has also served as the Director of Residence Life and the Director of Project Development in the Office of Student Affairs. In his time on the Student Affairs Staff, July 2005 - February 2007, Neely helped to envision, create, and pilot a number of innovations including the online housing lottery, living-learning communities, the First Year Interface website, and the IMPACT Wofford program. Neely taught 9th and 11th grade English at the Spartanburg Day School prior to his return to Wofford College.

Neely is the owner and creative director of the Wet Paint Syndrome Studio.

In 2014, Neely held an exhibit at the Martha Cloud Chapman Gallery in the Campus Life Building at Wofford College. The exhibit, called, "Iconic," featured pop culture icons as well as famous figures along with photographs of every people who are unnamed. Images are recreated—fractured, torn, presented in a unique and sometimes interactive style.

As of 2017, Neely is at Spartanburg Methodist College teaching art.

== Personal ==
Neely served as writer-in-residence and editor for Hidden Voices, a community-based art project sponsored by The Hub City Writers Project, the Spartanburg Arts Partnership, and Piedmont Care, Inc. Hidden Voices: Reflections from an Affected Community was published in October 2005 by the Hub City Writers Project.

In his studio, he experiments with new media and finds objects to create two-dimensional and three-dimensional art.

In 2008, Neely presented his work in the Guild Gallery at the Chapman Cultural Center in Spartanburg. He also exhibited a series of works at Emory University in March 2011 titled "Into Your Hands: Post Modern Meditations on the Stations of the Cross." His oversize photographs of a Spartanburg water tower are on permanent display at the Spartanburg County Administration Building. In June 2006, he was invited to hang a two-month solo exhibition of paintings and photographs in the Martha Cloud Chapman Gallery at Wofford College. The exhibition was then moved for two months to the Spartanburg High School Gallery.

Neely's work is represented in both local and regional galleries, and he has completed commissioned work for the Campus Safety Office (2006), Carlisle Residence Hall (2006), and the Success Initiative Center (2005) at Wofford College. In March 2008, Neely's poetry was featured in the anthology, Still Home, edited by Rachel Harkai. Neely was named the 2005 Unsung Hero by Piedmont Care at the 2005 South Carolina HIV/STD Conference held in Greenville, South Carolina.
