= Walter G. Tolleson =

American businessman and pioneer

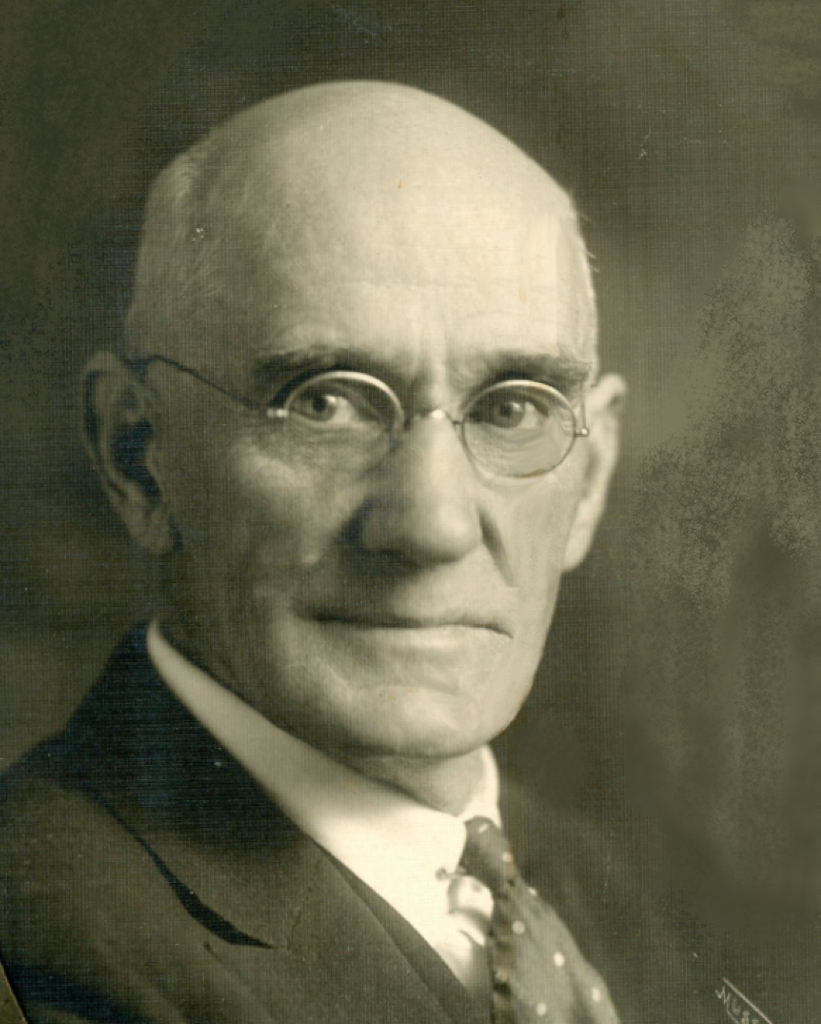
- Portrait of Walter G. Tolleson
- Born: May 13, 1860; South Carolina
- Died: October 13, 1940 (aged 80); Phoenix, Arizona
- Occupation(s): Entrepreneur; Real Estate Developer

Walter Gist Tolleson (1860–1940) was an American businessman, developer, rancher, and pioneer of Arizona's West Valley. He is best known for founding Tolleson, Arizona.

== Early life ==
Tolleson initially lived in Spartansburg, South Carolina, where he owned a wholesale drug firm and worked as a druggist.

Tolleson moved to a ranch in Phoenix in September 1908. Tolleson may have moved to the area to help with the health of his eldest son, as the arid climate of Phoenix was rumored to be good for common diseases of the time, such as tuberculosis.

== Tolleson, Arizona ==
In 1910, Tolleson and his family moved to a 160-acre ranch, about ten miles west of Phoenix, near what became the intersection of 91st Avenue and Van Buren Street.

In 1912, Tolleson subdivided forty acres of his land. He chartered an Arizona Eastern Railway train to carry passengers from Phoenix to his land. Tolleson advertised a land auction, offering the train ride and a lunch for free, as well $5 in gold to entice people to purchase parcels of land for $50. Ultimately, eighty people took the offer, and the town of Tolleson was officially founded. Tolleson reopened the Ten Mile Store, which served as a stagecoach stop and general store for people traveling west from Phoenix, to Yuma and California. Tolleson built the first lumberyard in the area in 1912 to spur development. In 1913, the town's post office opened in the general store. Walter Tolleson's brother, Leon served as postmaster.

Over the decades, largely due to the construction of canals in the Salt River Valley, agriculture expanded in the area. Many large farms were built, making agriculture the primary industry. Tolleson became known as the "Vegetable Center of the World". Many Mexicans migrated and built homes in the area as they began working on the farms.

Agriculture remains in the area, but much of the work that once required manual labor has been automated, shrinking the job market. Tolleson then became a hub for corporate warehouses and distribution centers. The city hosts numerous Fortune 500 companies and employs approximately 200,000 people, nearly thirty times its population of 7,000.

== Death ==
After developing the town, Walter Tolleson moved to Phoenix.

Walter G. Tolleson died on October 13, 1940, at age eighty after ten days in the hospital. He had fallen into a ditch while visiting his townsite, breaking his leg in two places.

He was laid to rest at the Sunnyside Mausoleum in Long Beach, California, with his wife.
