= Rod Keenan =

American fashion designer

- Born: July 3, 1968 (age 58); Great Bend, Kansas
- Label: Rod Keenan New York
- Website: www.rodkeenannewyork.com

Rod Keenan (born July 3, 1968, in Great Bend, Kansas) is an American milliner and is the creator of a handcrafted men's headwear collection that is marketed under his label Rod Keenan New York.

== Early years and education ==
Keenan grew up in Great Bend, Kansas; he graduated from the University of Kansas in Lawrence, Kansas, and he attended the Fashion Institute of Technology in New York City and the Parsons School of Design in Paris, France.

== Career ==
Keenan is a reclusive New York milliner recognized in fashion circles for re-establishing men’s headwear as a fashion commodity in the early 1990s. Keenan is noted for choosing to locate his design studio in the Manhattan neighborhood of Harlem, New York.

Inducted into the Council of Fashion Designers of America (CFDA) in 2006, Keenan has spent the past few years expanding his customer base from celebrities and fashion magazines to a broader clientele of fashion consumers.

Drawing on sources that are as divergent as the Dadaists, Elsa Schiaparelli, ancient Egypt, and Kurt Weill, Keenan maintains a characteristic New York vernacular, while he designs in the finest Italian tradition and executes his work with British millinery precision.

In addition to creating hats for celebrities such as Elvis Costello, the Scissor Sisters, Snoop Dogg, Justin Timberlake, and Brad Pitt, among others, Keenan has also designed hats for designers Paul Smith and Dries van Noten. Keenan's hat collections can be found in Barneys New York and Harvey Nichols in London, England.
