= Tolleson, Arizona =

City in Arizona, United States

- City
- Flag Seal
- Motto: "Honoring Our Past, Positioning Our Future"
- Location in Maricopa County, Arizona

- Location within Maricopa County, Arizona Location within Arizona Location within the United States
- Coordinates: 33°27′00″N 112°15′34″W
- Country: United States
- State: Arizona
- County: Maricopa

Government
  - Type: City council
  - Mayor: Juan F. Rodriguez

Area
  - Total: 5.73 sq mi (14.85 km^{2})
  - Land: 5.73 sq mi (14.85 km^{2})
  - Water: 0 sq mi (0.00 km^{2})
- Elevation: 1,014 ft (309 m)

Population (2020)
  - Total: 7,216
  - Density: 1,258.6/sq mi (485.94/km^{2})
- Time zone: UTC-7 (MST (no DST))
- ZIP Code: 85353
- Area code: 623
- FIPS code: 04-74190
- GNIS feature ID: 2412078
- Website: www.tolleson.az.gov

Tolleson /ˈtɒlɪsən/ is a city in Maricopa County, Arizona, United States. According to the U.S. Census Bureau, the population of the city was 7,216 as of the 2020 census, up from 6,545 in 2010.

== History ==
The city was incorporated in 1929 and named after founders Walter G. Tolleson and his wife Alethea H. Tolleson. The Tollesons moved to the area in 1910, buying a 160-acre ranch at the intersection of 91st Avenue and Van Buren Street. Walter Tolleson reopened the Ten Mile Store which was the first stagecoach stop and general merchandise store in route to Yuma from Phoenix. The store was located on what is now the intersection of 91st Drive and Monroe Street.

In 1912, the Tollesons subdivided their ranch, allowing more people to buy their land. In an effort to market his new community as a good opportunity for farmers, Mr. Tolleson chartered a train and provided free lunches for anyone to make the journey. He also gave away five dollars' worth of gold to better entice people. Eighty lots were sold at a price of $50.00 per lot.

Leon Tolleson, Walter's brother, became the first postmaster of the development in 1913. The with rural mail route operated out of Walter's general merchandise store for a time before a stand-alone post office was built at what is now 91st Avenue and Van Buren Street, where it is still located today.

Beginning in the 1940s, agriculture in the surrounding area began to take off, providing a great economic boost to the city. By the 1950s, Tolleson had become known as the "Vegetable Center of the World." The early 1960s saw a rapid decline of agri-business as more machinery became available to farmers in the area, leading to decreased need for labor.

The 1970s city planners developed a master plan, began street beautification projects, encouraged new housing development and built a multi-million dollar sewage treatment plant essential for industrial and residential growth. The city hoped that this would help entice new businesses and homebuyers to move in driving up population and revenue once again, seen as an investment in the city's future. Tolleson also expanded its land during the Phoenix metropolitan area's “range war” in the late 1970s. Cities such as Avondale, Goodyear, and Phoenix, began annexing large chunks of land around where the I-10 was set to go through. Tolleson went from one square mile to six square miles during this time. The cities around Tolleson often had much more buying power so the small town could not grow as much as others. In one instance, Phoenix bought two strips of land measuring thirty and fifty feet wide between Tolleson and Avondale solely so that Tolleson would be confined to its existing space.

The 1980s marked the entry of Fry's Food and Drug and Albertson's Distribution Centers that generated spinoff industrial development to Tolleson. These distributors showed other businesses the strategic placement of Tolleson in moving supplies and products due to its close proximity to Phoenix as well as California, allowing for easy shipment of imports coming from the west coast. Tolleson also sits along Interstate 10, Union Pacific Railroad and State Route 85, as well as the newly constructed Loop 202 only 3 miles to the east creating an efficient transporting environment.

Tolleson is an employment center for the West Valley, hosting over twenty Fortune 500 companies. The city employs more than 20,000 people, while having a population just over 7,000 residents. Tolleson has one of the highest jobs-to-residents ratios in the nation.

== Geography ==
Tolleson is located on the western side of the Phoenix metropolitan area. The community lies just south of I-10. The city of Avondale lies approximately 6 miles (10 km) to the southwest, and Fowler, a former unincorporated community within the Phoenix city limits, is 3 miles (5 km) to the east. The Agua Fria River is about 4 miles (6 km) to the west.

According to the United States Census Bureau, the city of Tolleson has a total area of 5.7 square miles (15 km^{2}), all land.

== Demographics ==
Historical population
Census	Pop.	Note	%±
1930	910		—
1940	1,731		90.2%
1950	3,042		75.7%
1960	3,886		27.7%
1970	3,881		−0.1%
1980	4,433		14.2%
1990	4,434		0.0%
2000	4,974		12.2%
2010	6,545		31.6%
2020	7,216		10.3%
U.S. Decennial Census

=== Racial and ethnic composition ===
Tolleson city, Arizona – Racial composition Note: the US Census treats Hispanic/Latino as an ethnic category. This table excludes Latinos from the racial categories and assigns them to a separate category. Hispanics/Latinos may be of any race.
Race (NH = Non-Hispanic)	2020	2010	2000	1990	1980
White alone (NH)	9.9% (712)	11% (719)	19% (945)	22.5% (996)	30% (1,332)
Black alone (NH)	6.9% (500)	5.8% (377)	1.2% (58)	0.5% (20)	1.2% (55)
American Indian alone (NH)	0.9% (63)	1% (65)	0.5% (27)	1% (43)	0.1% (6)
Asian alone (NH)	1.3% (97)	0.8% (53)	0.3% (14)	0.8% (36)	0.3% (15)
Pacific Islander alone (NH)	0% (0)	0.2% (11)	0.2% (8)		
Other race alone (NH)	0.5% (34)	0.2% (10)	0% (2)	0.7% (31)	0% (0)
Multiracial (NH)	1.4% (98)	1.1% (69)	0.8% (42)	—	—
Hispanic/Latino (any race)	79.2% (5,712)	80.1% (5,241)	78% (3,878)	74.6% (3,308)	68.2% (3,025)

=== 2020 census ===
As of the 2020 census, Tolleson had a population of 7,216. The median age was 30.1 years. 31.1% of residents were under the age of 18 and 10.8% of residents were 65 years of age or older. For every 100 females there were 93.6 males, and for every 100 females age 18 and over there were 88.8 males age 18 and over.

100.0% of residents lived in urban areas, while 0.0% lived in rural areas.

There were 2,173 households in Tolleson, of which 52.4% had children under the age of 18 living in them. Of all households, 37.5% were married-couple households, 17.9% were households with a male householder and no spouse or partner present, and 36.8% were households with a female householder and no spouse or partner present. About 16.2% of all households were made up of individuals and 7.1% had someone living alone who was 65 years of age or older.

There were 2,294 housing units, of which 5.3% were vacant. The homeowner vacancy rate was 1.3% and the rental vacancy rate was 3.5%.

=== 2010 census ===
As of the 2010 census, Tolleson had a population of 6,545. The ethnic and racial makeup of the population was 80.1% Hispanic (72.7% of the total population identifying as of Mexican descent, 1.0% identifying as being of Puerto Rican descent), 11.0% non-Hispanic white, 5.8% non-Hispanic blacks, 1.0% non-Hispanic Native American, 0.9% Asian, 0.2% Pacific Islander, 0.2% non-Hispanic reporting some other race and 4.2% reporting two or more races (only 1.1% of the population was non-Hispanics reporting two or more races, however Hispanicness itself is not treated as something one can be partly).

=== 2000 census ===
At the 2000 census, there were 4,974 people, 1,432 households, and 1,151 families living in the city. The population density was 894.1 inhabitants per square mile (345.2/km^{2}). There were 1,485 housing units at an average density of 266.9 per square mile (103.1/km^{2}). The racial makeup of the city was 52.2% White, 1.4% Black or African American, 1.2% Native American, 0.5% Asian, 0.2% Pacific Islander, 40.8% from other races, and 3.7% from two or more races. 78.0% of the population were Hispanic or Latino of any race.

Of the 1,432 households, 39.3% had children under the age of 18 living with them, 52.7% were married couples living together, 19.8% had a female householder with no husband present, and 19.6% were non-families. 15.9% of households were one person and 7.1% were one person aged 65 or older. The average household size was 3.47 and the average family size was 3.83.

The age distribution was 32.4% under the age of 18, 10.9% from 18 to 24, 27.4% from 25 to 44, 19.4% from 45 to 64, and 9.8% 65 or older. The median age was 29 years. For every 100 females, there were 102.8 males. For every 100 females age 18 and over, there were 100.8 males.

The median household income was $38,773 and the median family income was $43,894. Males had a median income of $26,934 versus $23,511 for females. The per capita income for the city was $13,747. About 9.9% of families and 13.7% of the population were below the poverty line, including 19.4% of those under age 18 and 10.9% of those age 65 or over.

== Economy ==
SK Food Group, in a partnership with Phoenix and Tolleson, expanded operations in 2016. Their food processing plant is projected to bring 550 jobs, with an emphasis on helping unemployed youth ages 16–24 who are not attending school and on attracting talent across the Valley.

=== Top employers ===
According to Tolleson's 2021 Comprehensive Annual Financial Report, the top employers in the city are:

#	Employer	# of Employees
1	JBS Packerland	1,150
2	Papa Johns Salads Produce (Taylor Farms)	960
3	Albertsons, Inc.	810
4	Atlas Retail Services	650
5	SK Food Group	550
6	PepsiCo	440
7	Carvana Co	400
8	AutoZone	380
9	Salt River Project	380
10	Sysco Arizona	370

== Notable people ==
- Merle Keagle, baseball player
- Bob Stump, congressman
- Anna Tovar, state legislator and former mayor of Tolleson

== Governmental representation ==
The city is in Arizona's 3rd congressional district, served by Representative Yassamin Ansari, and Arizona's 22nd legislative district, served by Representatives Elda Luna-Nájera and Lupe Contreras and Senator Eva Diaz, all Democrats.

== Education ==
The city is served by Tolleson Union High School District, Tolleson Elementary School District, Littleton Elementary School District, Union Elementary School District and Fowler Elementary School District.
