= Agua Fria High School =

Public high school in Maricopa County, Arizona

Location
- 530 East Riley Drive; Avondale, Arizona 85323-2154; United States; 33°26′24″N 112°20′40″W

Information
- School type: Public high school
- Motto: Honor First, Win or Lose
- Established: 1956; 70 years ago
- School district: Agua Fria Union High School District
- CEEB code: 030007
- NCES School ID: 040045000001
- Principal: Autumn Daniels
- Teaching staff: 92.00 (on FTE basis)
- Enrollment: 1,599 (2023–2024)
- Student to teacher ratio: 17.38
- Colors: Scarlet and gray
- Athletics conference: AIA
- Mascot: Owl
- Team name: Owls
- USNWR ranking: 4,682
- Newspaper: OwlFeed
- Website: www.aguafria.org/afhs

Agua Fria High School is a public high school in Avondale, Arizona, United States. Operated by the Agua Fria Union High School District, it is the first school built in the district and its only school until the establishment of Millennium High School in 1999.

Established as Litchfield Park High School, it graduated its first class in 1932. In 1956, the school relocated to Avondale and became Agua Fria Union High School, named for the adjacent Agua Fria River. Agua Fria experienced continuous growth throughout the late 20th century, brought about by economic developments in the West Valley area and the completion of Interstate 10 and Palo Verde Nuclear Generating Station in the West Valley.

As of 2022, Agua Fria offers 23 varsity sports and various extracurricular activities to its 1,608 students. The school is majority Hispanic and Latino. A one-time Blue Ribbon school, Agua Fria is ranked 4,682nd nationally and 84th in Arizona by U.S. News and World Report.

== History ==
=== Planning and opening ===
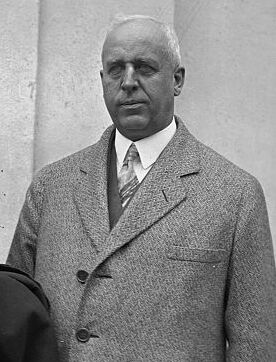
Litchfield Park High School was dedicated to Paul W. Litchfield.

Efforts to form a high school district in Litchfield Park began to form in the late 1920s. However, to organize, the district needed a valuation of $1,500,000 or an average daily attendance of 200 or more, neither of which the district had. The petition was ultimately approved by George W. P. Hunt, who saw a business prospect in the formation of a school district, leading to the Litchfield Park High School District. Until the establishment of Litchfield Park High School, high school students attended a makeshift high school set up in a small wooden building near Pendergast Elementary School in Phoenix. In 1927, Tolleson Union High School was established.

In 1928, Litchfield Park High School was constructed under the Litchfield Park High School District in Litchfield Park and dedicated to Paul W. Litchfield, the first CEO of the Goodyear Tire & Rubber Company and the founder of Litchfield Park. The boundaries of Litchfield Park High School were drawn identical to the nearby Litchfield Elementary School. Approximately forty students attended Litchfield Park in its first year. In 1941, following the attack on Pearl Harbor and the United States' use of Luke Air Force Base in World War II, along with the formation of the Goodyear Aircraft Corporation, Litchfield Park High School was expanded. By 1944, there were 141 students at Litchfield Park. The increase in Litchfield Park's student population necessitated a building project to handle the new students, and in 1942, a small building with two classrooms was constructed. In December 1943, the Bobo Construction Company was awarded a contract for $11,990 to construct an additional wing to the school's campus, adding two new classrooms.

On multiple occasions, Litchfield Park High School used bonds to fund projects. In May 1928, voters in Litchfield Park approved a bond issue for $36,000, with $24,000 going to the high school, while the other $12,000 went to the elementary school. The Southwest Cotton Company donated $9,000 to Litchfield Park, which was used to construct a study hall. The construction of a shared auditorium between the high school and the elementary school caused conflict; the auditorium was eventually turned into a gymnasium, resolving the conflict. The Litchfield Park Parent Teachers Association (LPPTA) was formed in 1944 to aid the school in construction projects. The LPPTA was able to use funds from a community dance to build a First Aid room in 1945, and in 1946, the LPPTA was able to hold a carnival on the school's patio. The carnival's success allowed the LPPTA to hold another carnival, and helped pay for band uniforms.

=== Relocation and growth ===
The city of Avondale lacked a school district until 1956. Prior to the establishment of Agua Fria Union High School, Avondale had been paying $77,743 to Tolleson Union, Litchfield Park, and Phoenix Technical School to provide education to its high school students. In 1952, the Avondale Elementary School District, Litchfield Park High School District, and the Tolleson Union High School District met to address the issue. The Avondale and Litchfield Park districts agreed to establish a union school district. The necessity for a high school district in Avondale contributed to the formation of the Agua Fria Union High School District (AFUHSD) in 1955. Litchfield Park High School, now Litchfield High School, became a part of the AFUHSD upon its formation.

In 1956, Agua Fria Union High School was established in Avondale, replacing Litchfield Park High School, and designed to accommodate 350 students. The school was constructed on 57 acres—purchased for $57,000 on Riley Drive—and cost $500,000 to build. The initial salary for teachers was $3,507. Upon its opening, Chauncey Coor became the superintendent of Agua Fria, eventually becoming the mayor of Goodyear in the 1980s. In November 1957, the AFUHSD held a bond election for $137,000, designed to add an additional wing for classrooms, enlarge dressing rooms, and add a vocational agriculture building. The AFUHSD would continue to hold bond elections; in 1961, taxpayers voted on a $260,000 bond issue to finance the construction of twelve classrooms, physics and biology laboratories, and a language facility, and in 1962, the district proposed a 39 cent tax increase, citing the need to withdraw tuition payments from other schools—such as the newly constructed Dysart High School in El Mirage—in the district. A $4.8 million bond proposal in 1974 succeeded in Litchfield Park, but failed in Avondale. The measure would have added a new high school in Goodyear, to help alleviate overcrowding issues at Agua Fria Union. In 1969, plans began to form to reform education in Litchfield Park, a city known for its agriculture. The Goodyear Tire & Rubber Company donated $15,000, as did Educational Facilities Laboratories, to help finance a study from Arizona State University to assess the educational output of Litchfield Park.

As the westward expansion of Phoenix continued, economic activity in the West Valley grew. The completion of Interstate 10 in the West Valley and construction on Palo Verde Nuclear Generating Station contributed to an increase in high school enrollment in the West Valley. In 1976, voters approved a $3,975,000 bond to construct a new high school for freshmen and sophomores, completing the goals of the AFUHSD's bond proposal in 1974. The proposal also included funds to remodel the physical education rooms at Agua Fria Union.Agua Fria North—Agua Fria Union High School's northern campus just west of Litchfield Park—was established as the high school's freshman-only campus for the 1979-80 school year. In 1998, continued growth in the Goodyear area forced the AFUHSD to convert Agua Fria North into a four-year high school, and in 1999, Agua Fria North reopened as Millennium High School.

=== Further development ===
In the 2000s, Agua Fria High School began to experience further growth attributed to new housing developments in the West Valley and farm fields, with the AFUHSD nearly doubling in enrollment since 1995. Beginning in 1998, the AFUHSD implemented multiple funding phases; the first, approved in 1998 for $11 million, added 20 new classrooms to Agua Fria and added central plants for heating and cooling. In August 2000, the AFUHSD considered the sale of $2.78 million in school improvement bonds, adding an additional gymnasium to Agua Fria.

In February 2009, a mercury spill occurred at Agua Fria High School, when several students began spreading mercury among themselves, causing the worst mercury spill in Arizona history. The Arizona Department of Environmental Quality and the Environmental Protection Agency (EPA) were called in to assess and investigate the spill. Agua Fria reopened one week after the spill was reported, although strict screening measures were implemented to detect traces of mercury. An analysis from the Avondale Police Department found that several hundred students and teachers were exposed to the mercury, which was obtained from a retired chemistry teacher. Emails surfaced as a result of the investigation revealed that mercury was present at the school as far back as 2007. Cleanup operations cost the EPA $800,000, of which $173,614 went to renovating parts of the school, including new walls for laboratories and science classrooms, new cabinets, and new carpet and sealed floors.

Throughout the 2000s, the AFUHSD would continue to use bonds and grants to fund projects at Agua Fria. In 2008, the district applied for an Arizona School Facilities Board energy project implementation grant, which would implement water saving measures at Agua Fria, such as low-flow faucets, waterless urinals, and a smart landscape irrigation system. In 2011, the AFUHSD contracted Tempe-based Clean Energy to install solar panels at Agua Fria High School, following similar projects at Verrado High School and Desert Edge High School. The age and slope of the roofs at Agua Fria introduced complexity, causing Clean Energy to instead install solar panels onto shade structures in the school's parking lot. The project cost $20 million, although much of the cost was subsided through tax credits and Arizona Public Service programs. The district estimated that it would save about $6.34 million in electricity costs over 20 years. That same year, voters approved a $31.6 million bond fund; the fund allocated $8.2 million for construction and repair projects at Agua Fria High School. The AFUHSD began construction on a students service building and a new library roof at Agua Fria High School in June 2012. In 2013, a new administration building was constructed at Agua Fria—along with renovations to the girls locker room, new security cameras, and resurfaced track fields—using part of the 2011 bond fund. The passage of a B-bond in 2012 allowed the AFUHSD to add bleachers to the softball field at Agua Fria, resurface its tennis courts, and paint the exterior of the school. The bond also helped pay for other security upgrades, such as improved fencing and campus perimeter upgrades, in response to the Sandy Hook Elementary School shooting. In the 2015-2016 school year, the boys locker room and the school's original gymnasium were remodeled. By 2014, the original gymnasium had been renamed in honor of O.K. Fulton, who had worked in the AFUHSD for 37 years until his passing in 2020.

During the COVID-19 pandemic, Agua Fria, along with the other schools in the AFUHSD, switched to a distance learning model. Agua Fria reopened in March 2021, following an executive order from Governor Doug Ducey.

== Academics ==
=== Enrollment ===
Student body composition as of 2021
Race and ethnicity	Total
Hispanic	67.2%
White	16.1%
Black	11.1%
Two or more Races	2.7%
Asian	1.7%
American Indian/Alaska Native	0.7%
Native Hawaiian/Pacific Islander	0.6%
Sex	Total
Female	51%
Male	49%

As of the 2021–2022 school year, Agua Fria had an enrollment of 1,608 students and 92.60 teachers (on FTE basis), for a student–teacher ratio of 17.37. As of 2019, 57% of students are on free or reduced lunch. The National Center for Education Statistics reported that in 2021 and 2022, the ethnic demographics of students was 69.8% Hispanic and Latino American, 13.3% Caucasian, 11.5% African American, 1.7% Asian American, and 3.7% other including American Indian, Alaska Native, Native Hawaiian, Pacific Islander American, and multiple raced backgrounds, making up a majority minority.

Although enrollment increased from 2013 to 2017, since 2017, enrollment has declined, from 1,757 students during the 2017–2018 school year to 1,608 students in the 2021–2022 school year. A shift in demographics has also occurred in the same time frame; the percentage of Hispanic and Latino students increased by 5%, while the percentage of Caucasian students decreased by 6%.

=== Awards ===
Agua Fria is a one-time National Blue Ribbon School, having received the award in 1982, when the program was founded. In 2022, U.S. News & World Report ranked Agua Fria 4,682nd nationally and 84th among schools in Arizona.

=== Curriculum ===
Consistent with other high schools in the Agua Fria Union High School District, the curriculum at Agua Fria typically includes four years of English and mathematics, and three years of laboratory-based sciences and history. In addition, students also take one year of a foreign language, two years of a fine arts class, and four years of an elective class. Agua Fria offers various elective courses and implements a vocational education program in fields such as coding, construction, and graphic design. Additionally, Agua Fria maintains a relationship with Luke Air Force Base and offers the Air Force Junior Reserve Officers Training Corps program.

Agua Fria offers multiple Advanced Placement (AP) classes, focusing on English, mathematics, science, history, art, and foreign languages. Students may earn college credit for taking these courses. As of 2022, Agua Fria offered 13 AP classes, and its AP program was participated in by 34% of students, of which 49% passed their AP exams. Foreign language offerings at Agua Fria include Spanish, French, and German, the former culminating in AP Spanish Language and Culture. Through Estrella Mountain Community College's dual enrollment program, certain classes at Verrado allow students to earn college credit concurrently as they take the course.

As part of the AFUHSD, sophomores, juniors, and seniors at Verrado can attend online classes through the school. These classes are taken outside of school hours, and a fee is required.

In 2016, ProPublica reported that around a fifth of students take the SAT or ACT, and 2% are in a gifted and talented program. As of 2022, Agua Fria students had an average SAT composite score of 1120 out of 1600. The Arizona Board of Regents found that, for the 2015-2016 school year, 49% of students attended some form of post-secondary education.

== Extracurricular activities ==
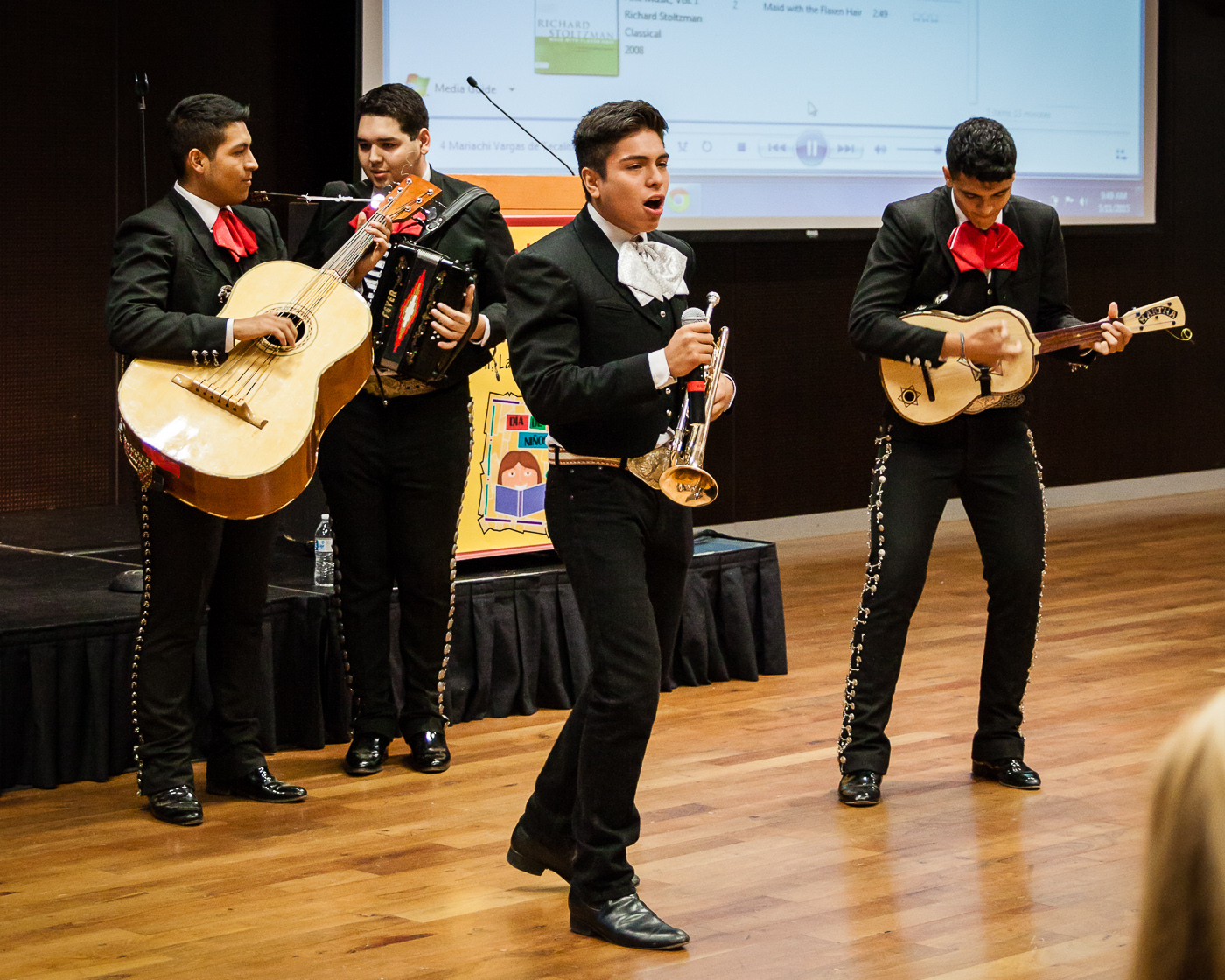
The mariachi band perform at Arizona State University, pictured in 2015.

=== Athletics ===
Agua Fria High School fields 23 varsity teams, including badminton, track/cross country, football, golf, swimming, volleyball, basketball, soccer, wrestling, baseball/softball, and tennis, competing under the Agua Fria Owls moniker in the Arizona Interscholastic Association. In the AIA, the Agua Fria Owls compete in the 4A conference and in Division II.

=== Music ===
Agua Fria's music program was founded in 1958, comprising a jazz band, marching band, concert band, and choral groups. In addition, Agua Fria has a mariachi band.

The marching band and color guard, competing as the Band of Owls, participate in Division 2A in the Arizona Marching Band Association competition. The band also performs in other events, such as the annual Billy Moore Days festival in Avondale. The Band of Owls participated in the Hollywood Christmas Parade in 2002; the trip cost $30,000, but was subsided using fundraisers and a $5,000 contribution.

== Notable alumni ==
- Randall McDaniel – former National Football League (NFL) player and member of the Pro Football Hall of Fame
- Everson Griffen – former NFL player
- Bill Lueck – former NFL player
- Rusty Tillman – former NFL player
- Aaron Altherr – professional baseball player
- Cardell Camper – professional baseball player
- Shawn Gilbert – professional baseball player
- Sammy Solis – professional baseball player

== See also ==
- Education in Arizona
