= Millennium High School (Arizona) =

Public high school in Goodyear, Arizona

Location
- 14802 West Wigwam Boulevard; Goodyear, Arizona 85395; United States; 33.49467°N 112.3769°W

Information
- School type: Public high school
- Motto: This is Millennium
- Established: 1999; 27 years ago
- School district: Agua Fria Union High School District
- CEEB code: 030159
- NCES School ID: 040045001884
- Principal: Nichole Bundy
- Teaching staff: 102.40 (on FTE basis)
- Grades: 9-12
- Enrollment: 2,253 (2023-2024)
- Student to teacher ratio: 22.00
- Colors: Royal purple, silver and black
- Athletics conference: AIA
- Mascot: Tiger
- Team name: Tigers
- USNWR ranking: 3,986
- Website: Millennium High School

Millennium High School is a public high school in Goodyear, Arizona, United States. Operated by the Agua Fria Union High School District, it is the second high school in the district.

Millennium High School was established in 1999 as a separate high school after serving for several years as Agua Fria North High School, in relation to Agua Fria High School, out of a separate campus originally established in the 1980s for freshmen only.

As of 2022, Millennium offers 23 varsity sports and various extracurricular activities to its 1,965 students. The school's large Hispanic and Latino population, along with significant percentages of African American, Asian, Native American and mixed race students, helps make up a majority minority. Millennium is ranked 3,986nd nationally and 67th in Arizona by U.S. News and World Report.

== History ==
=== Planning and opening ===
In 1928, Litchfield High School was constructed in Litchfield Park, Arizona, and in 1955, the Agua Fria Union High School District was formed from the Avondale Elementary School District and the Litchfield Park High School District. Litchfield High School, renamed to Agua Fria Union High School upon its relocation to Avondale in 1956, held a bond proposal in 1974 to construct a new high school in the Goodyear area. The proposal succeeded in Litchfield Park, but failed in Avondale.

In 1976, voters approved a $3,975,000 bond to construct a new high school for freshmen and sophomores. By 1982, Agua Fria North was established as an all-freshman high school. Agua Fria North was converted into a four-year high school in 1998, necessitated by growth in the Goodyear area, and in 1999, Agua Fria North reopened as Millennium High School.

=== Growth ===
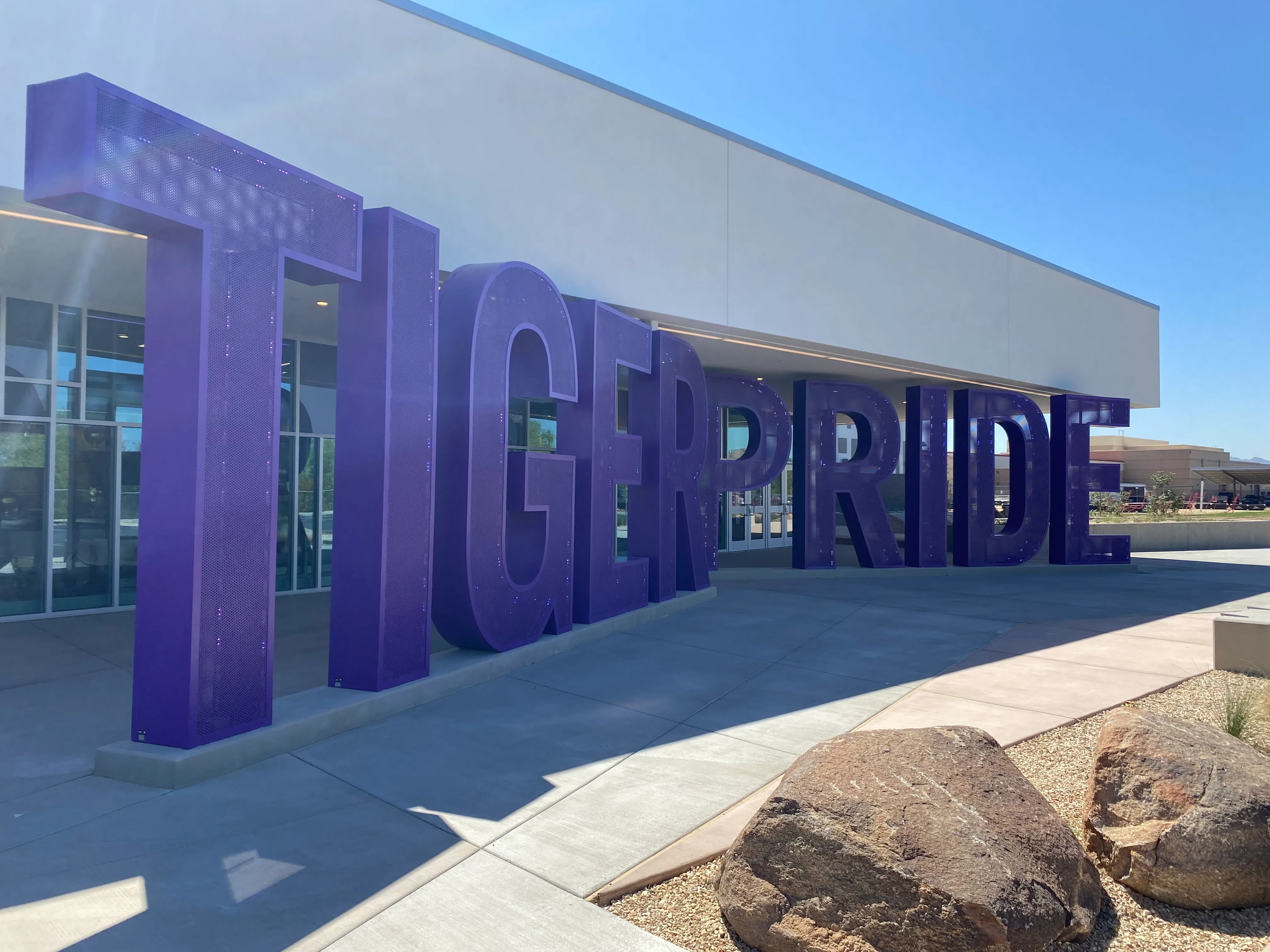
Millennium High School in 2022.

In the early 2000s, the AFUHSD began to rely heavily on bonds to fund Millennium High School, facing a growing population of residents in the West Valley region. By the 2000–2001 school year, Millennium had 1,350 students, nearing its 1,600 student capacity. To alleviate these issues, the AFUHSD implemented multiple funding phases: the first, approved in 1998 for $11 million, added 27 classrooms to Millennium. In August 2000, the AFUHSD considered the sale of $2.78 million in school improvement bonds. The bonds would be used towards a gymnasium and auditorium, which Millennium lacked at the time.

In 2011, solar panel installations were added to Agua Fria and Millennium. The district had previously added solar panels to the roofs at Desert Edge High School and Verrado High School in 2010. That same year, voters approved a $31.6 million bond fund, $15.2 million of which was spent on a new classroom building and improvements to the school's athletic facilities.

Millennium High School has used alternative funding sources to raise money. In 2014, Millennium partnered with a Dutch Bros. Coffee store in Goodyear; for a single day, proceeds from large drinks sold at the store would be donated to Millennium, and offered customers an incentive for purchasing a large drink. The deal earned Millennium $5,100.

=== Further expansions ===
In June 2022, Millennium began construction on a $16.25 million gymnasium, dubbed the "Rise and Roar Center", with the efforts of McCarthy Building Companies and BWS Architects.

== Academics ==
=== Enrollment ===
Student body composition as of 2021
Race and ethnicity	Total
White	40.4%
Hispanic	37.6%
Black	10.9%
Asian	7.2%
Two or more Races	2.4%
American Indian/Alaska Native	1.1%
Native Hawaiian/Pacific Islander	0.5%
Sex	Total
Female	52%
Male	48%

As of the 2021–2022 school year, Millennium had an enrollment of 1,965 students and 92.30 teachers (on FTE basis), for a student–teacher ratio of 21.29. As of 2019, 25% of students are on free or reduced lunch. The National Center for Education Statistics reported that in 2021 and 2022, the ethnic demographics of students was 40.6% Caucasian, 37.4% Hispanic and Latino American, 9.7% African American, 7.4% Asian American, and 4.7% other including American Indian, Alaska Native, Native Hawaiian, Pacific Islander American, and multiple raced backgrounds, making up a majority minority.

Since 2016, enrollment has declined, from 2,400 students to 1,965 students. The percentage of Caucasian students has increased since 2021, following a decrease beginning in the 2017–2018 school year.

=== Awards ===
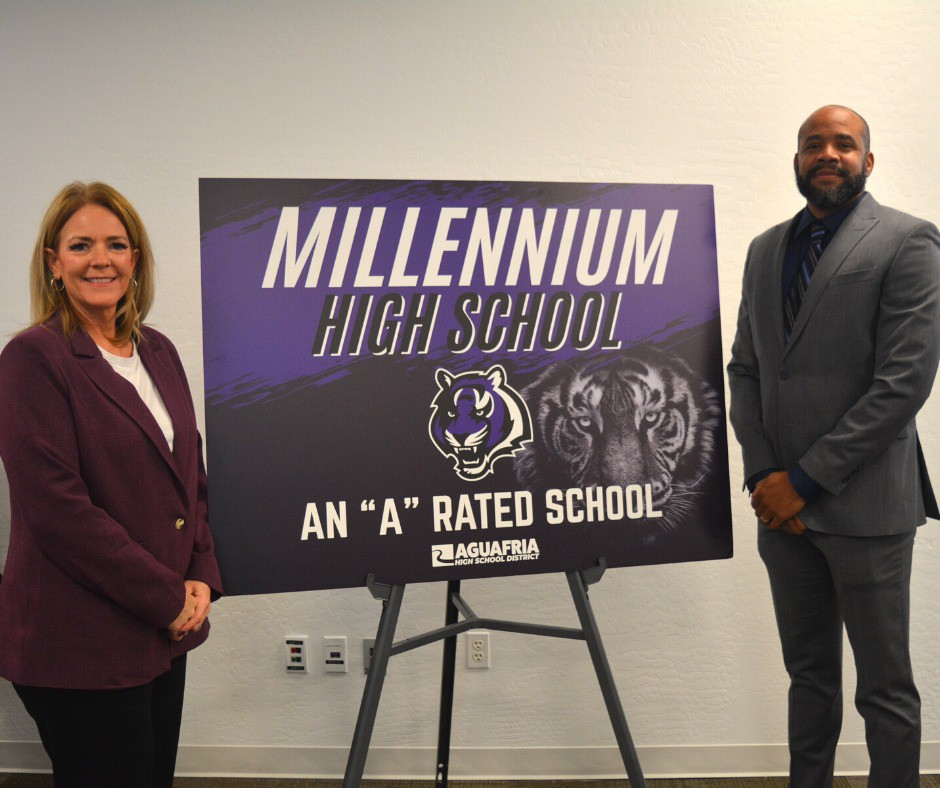
Millennium High School receives an "A" rating.

In 2022, U.S. News & World Report ranked Millennium High School 3,986th nationally and 67th among schools in Arizona. The same year, the Arizona Department of Education awarded Millennium High School an "A" rating.

=== Curriculum ===
The curriculum at Millennium typically includes four years of English and mathematics, and three years of laboratory-based sciences and history, consistent with other schools in the Agua Fria Union High School District. In addition, students also take one year of a foreign language, two years of a fine arts class, and four years of an elective class.

Millennium is the only high school in the AFUHSD to offer the International Baccalaureate program, having started the program in 2009. Students at Millennium can take Advanced Placement (AP) classes, focusing on English, mathematics, science, history, art, and foreign languages. As of 2022, there are 15 AP classes offered, with about a quarter of students taking at least one AP class. About 41% of students pass their AP tests.

As part of the AFUHSD, sophomores, juniors, and seniors at Millennium can attend online classes through the school. These classes are taken outside of school hours, and a fee is required.

A ProPublica report in 2016 found that around a fifth of students take the SAT or ACT, and 5% are in a gifted and talented program. As of 2022, Millennium students had an average SAT composite score of 1190 out of 1600. The Arizona Board of Regents found that, for the 2015–2016 school year, 58.2% of students attended some form of post-secondary education.

== Extracurricular activities ==
Millennium High School fields 23 varsity teams, including badminton, track/cross country, football, golf, swimming, volleyball, basketball, soccer, wrestling, baseball/softball, and tennis; additionally, Millennium has an esports team. These teams compete under the Millennium Tigers moniker in the Arizona Interscholastic Association (AIA). In the AIA, the Millennium Tigers compete in the 5A conference and in Division II.

Millennium's marching band and color guard compete under the Tiger moniker, like the other teams. As of 2019, the band program has 140 members. The marching band won the Arizona Marching Band Association (AZMBA) Grand Championships for 2019.

The Millennium Tigers have a long history of athletic excellence.

The Tiger girls basketball team were the state champions for four consecutive years from 2019 to 2022. In 2023, they were runners up in the state championships.

In 2020, the Tiger girls golf team placed eighth at the AIA Division II state tournament.

In 2022, the Tigers boys swim team won the state Division II swim title.

In 2023, the Tiger girls volleyball team were runners up in the state 5A championships.

In 2024, the Tiger boys basketball team were runners up in the state championships.

== Notable alumni ==
- Kyle Bradish - professional baseball player
- Carrick Felix - professional basketball player
- Marquis Flowers - professional football player
- DaRon Holmes II - professional basketball player
- Kennedy Noble - elite swimmer
- Josh Rojas - professional baseball player
- Treydan Stukes - professional football player

== See also ==
- Education in Arizona
