= Agua Fria Union High School District =

Union high school district west of Phoenix, Arizona

Address
- 1481 North Eliseo Felix Jr. Way Avondale, Arizona, 85323-2154; United States
- Coordinates: 33.4524°N 112.3360°W

District information
- Type: Public
- Motto: Creating Choice. Crafting Character. Cultivating Community.
- Grades: 9-12
- Established: 1955; 71 years ago
- Superintendent: Mark Yslas
- Deputy superintendent(s): Tom Huffman, Operations; Phillip Nowlin, Academics
- Schools: 6
- Budget: $88.5 million (2021–2022)
- NCES District ID: 0400450

Students and staff
- Students: 9,219 (2021–2022)
- Teachers: 433.10
- Staff: 796.95
- Student–teacher ratio: 21.28
- Colors: Old Glory Red, Old Glory Blue, White

Other information
- Website: www.aguafria.org

The Agua Fria Union High School District (AFUHSD) is a high school district serving Goodyear, Buckeye, Avondale, Waddell and Litchfield Park, Arizona. It was founded in 1955. Avondale Elementary School District and Litchfield Elementary School District feed into the district.

The district has six high schools and operates a non-traditional program to allow students to recover lost credits.

== History ==
The city of Avondale lacked a school district; as such, the city spent $77,743 to Tolleson Union High School, Litchfield Park High School, and Phoenix Technical School to provide education to its high school students. The Avondale Elementary School District, Litchfield Park High School District, and the Tolleson Union High School District met to address the issue in 1952, with the Avondale and Litchfield Park districts agreeing to establish a union school district. Agua Fria Union High School District No. 216 was formed in 1955. A year later, the district's first high school, Agua Fria High School, opened in Avondale, dividing the population of Litchfield High School.

Doug Wilson served as superintendent from 1999 until 2006; he took a position at Marana Unified School District in 2008. Dudley Butts became superintendent until his resignation in 2009, when Millennium High School principal Dennis Runyan became interim superintendent. Runyan served as superintendent until 2020, when he was replaced by Mark Yslas.

During the COVID-19 pandemic, the AFUHSD implemented distance learning, affecting high school traditions.

== Communities ==
The Agua Fria Union High School District serves the communities and neighborhoods of Goodyear, Buckeye, Avondale and Litchfield Park, Arizona, as well as the unincorporated community of Waddell, in what encompasses the West Valley.

In May 2022, the AFUHSD proposed an amendment to incorporate Canyon View High School into the neighboring city of Buckeye, allowing the school to hire a full-time resource officer through the Buckeye Police Department.

== Students ==
=== Academics ===
The Arizona Department of Education has recorded the ACT scores for each individual student since 2018, aggregating them into gender, race, and socioeconomic background, and dividing the scores into four performance levels. In the 2021-2022 school year, 26% of students were at Performance Level 1—the lowest of the four levels, 29% of students were at Performance Level 2, 34% of students were at Performance Level 3, and 10% of students were at Performance Level 4, for the English Language Arts standard. For the math standard, 35% of students were at Performance Level 1, 30% were at Performance Level 2, 25% of students were at Performance Level 3, and 9% of students were at Performance Level 4.

=== Demographics ===
In the 2021-2022 school year, the district had a total of 9,219 students, 433.10 teachers, and 363.85 staff, for a total of 796.95 employees on a full-time equivalent basis. The district's student to teacher ratio was 21.28. The ethnic distribution of students was:

- 9.75% African American
- 3.23% Asian
- 49.4% Hispanic
- 0.83% American Indian
- 0.39% Pacific Islander
- 3.34% Two or More Races
- 33.06% White

The number of Hispanic students has steadily increased since 2018, helping to comprise a majority minority.

== Bonds ==
The Agua Fria Union High School District has used bonds to fund projects within the district. In 1991, the district passed a $500,993 override. In 2005, the district proposed a $35.6 million bond referendum, designed to ease construction costs for Verrado High School—then in construction, relocation costs for the district's offices, and renovation costs of other schools in the district, without a tax increase. The district proposed a property tax increase in 2011 for $31.6 million, a 15.8% increase, to fund a new classroom building at Millennium High School, renovate buildings, add safety and energy efficiency to its buildings, and improve district transportation. In addition, the district also employs overrides. In 2021, the district requested a budget override to maintain class sizes and course options, as well as increase teachers' salaries and hire additional staff, at an expense to taxpayers, to no success. The district also uses grants; in 2008, the district applied for an Arizona School Facilities Board energy project implementation grant to implement low-flow faucets and waterless urinals at Agua Fria High School and a smart landscape irrigation system at Agua Fria and Millennium.

== Curriculum ==
The Agua Fria Union High School district has a consistent curriculum for its schools, although the availability of courses may vary by school.

=== College classes ===
The Agua Fria Union High School district offers dual enrollment courses through the Maricopa County Community College District, in which certain teachers are qualified to teach classes at Estrella Mountain, allowing students to earn college credits concurrently with their high school credits. Courses eligible for dual enrollment depend on the school; as of the 2022-2023 school year, Verrado High School offers dual enrollment classes in Spanish II and Honors Spanish III, Honors Anatomy and Physiology, AP Biology, Sports Medicine I and II, Rehabilitation/Therapeutic Modalities, and Honors Pre-calculus, Millennium High School offers dual enrollment classes in AP United States History, Algebra 3, Culinary Arts, AP Physics C: Mechanics, and Conceptual Physics, and Canyon View High School offers dual enrollment classes in Sports Medicine I and II, Algebra III, AP Biology, Anatomy & Physiology, AP Calculus, AP Statistics, and various agriculture-related classes.

In addition, the district also offers Advanced Placement (AP) classes at each of their five high schools, in subjects such as math, English, science, and the arts. Certain classes, such as Honors English II, may prepare students for these classes. Similarly, students at Millennium may enroll in International Baccalaureate courses, of a similar rigor to the AP courses, and may additionally earn an International Baccalaureate Diploma.

=== Fine arts ===
The Agua Fria Union High School district offers courses in band, choir, dance, and other visual arts. In 2019, Desert Edge High School began a fine arts showcase, designed to present the district's fine arts offerings. Desert Edge also operates the Conservatory of Arts and Design, a conservatory designed to enrich its fine arts program.

== Schools ==
The Agua Fria Union High School district serves students from ninth grade to twelfth grade. The district also offers an alternative high school program known as "Coldwater Academy", to aid students at risk of not graduating. The program began in 2007.

Attendance zones are used to create zoning areas. Students in those zoning areas must attend their respective schools; for instance, students residing in Avondale must attend Agua Fria High School. Exceptions may be made, such as accommodations for students in the International Baccalaureate program, although they are approved on a case-by-case basis, and dependent on the capacity of the school, among other factors. These attendance zones have been controversial; the redrawn attendance zones of the district following the opening of Verrado High School caused an uproar from parents and students. Students who could walk to the nearby Desert Edge High School were rezoned to Verrado, requiring another mode of transportation.

=== High schools ===
- Agua Fria High School was the first high school constructed in the district, built in 1956. For the 2021–2022 school year, there were 1,608 students enrolled. The principal is Autumn Daniels, and the mascot is the Owl.
- Millennium High School was the second high school built in the district. It opened in 1979 as Agua Fria North, before becoming a separate high school in 1999. For the 2021-2022 school year, there were 1,965 students enrolled. It is the only school in the district that offers the International Baccalaureate program. The principal is Nichole Bundy, and the mascot is the Tiger.
- Desert Edge High School was the third high school built in the district, built in 2002. For the 2021-2022 school year, there were 1,786 students enrolled. The principal is Gretchen Hann, and the mascot is the Scorpion.
- Verrado High School was the fourth high school constructed in the district, built in 2006. For the 2021-2022 school year, there were 1,715 students enrolled. The principal is Nathaniel Showman, and the mascot is the Viper.
- Canyon View High School was the fifth high school constructed in the district, built in 2018. For the 2021-2022 school year, there were 1,899 students enrolled. The principal is Lyn Reid, and the mascot is the Jaguar.
- Goodyear High School was the 6th high school in the district, built in 2025. For the 2025-2026 school year, there were 425 freshman students, with plans to expand the final population to roughly 2000 students. The principal is Jason Linn and the mascot is the Maverick.
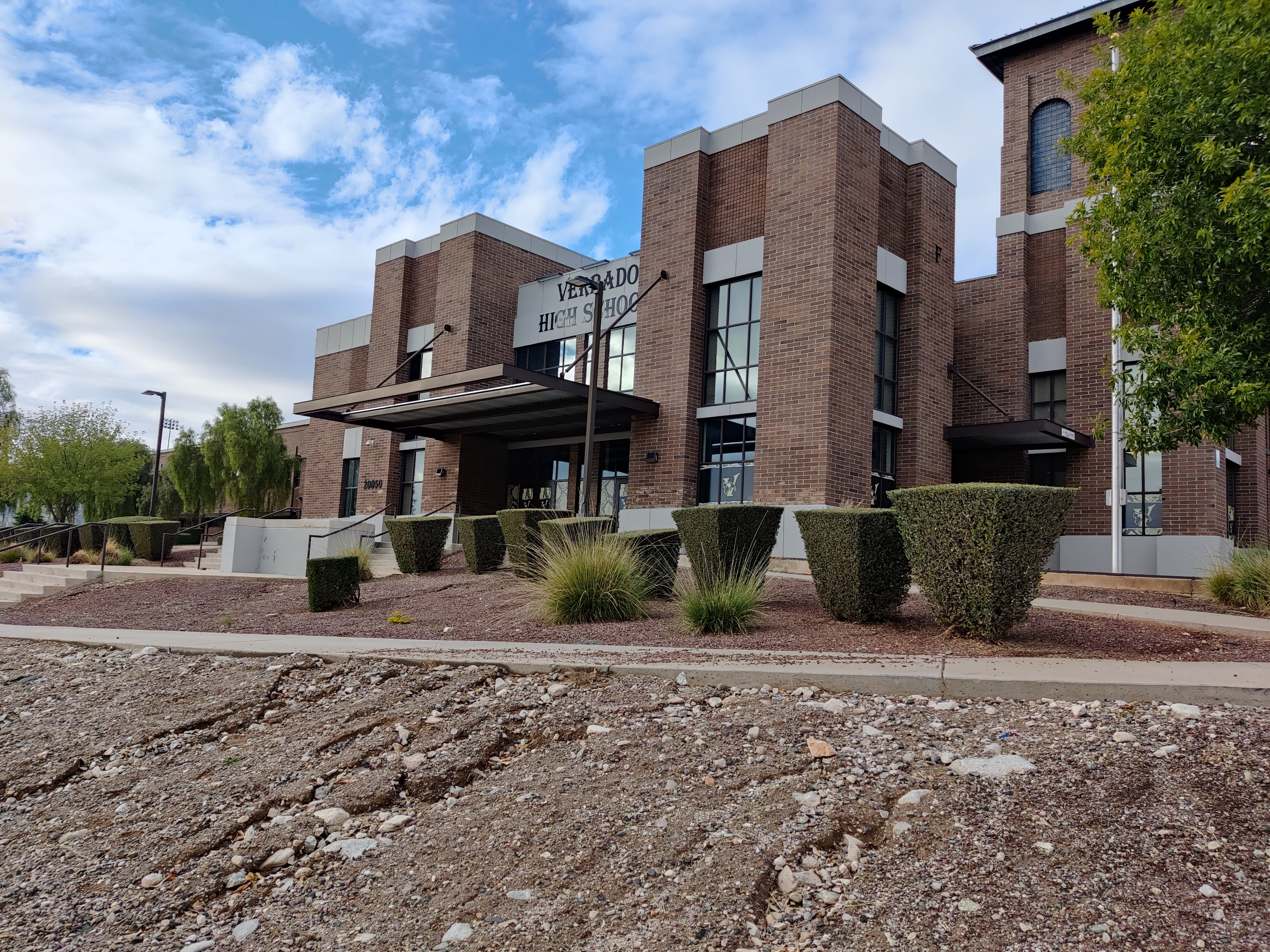
Verrado High School

== See also ==
- List of school districts in Arizona
- Education in Arizona
