= Goodyear High School =

Public high school in Goodyear, Arizona

- Digital rendering of the high school as it will look upon completion.

Location
- 17300 West Van Buren Street; Goodyear, Maricopa County, Arizona 85338; United States; 33.45338°N 112.43057°W

Information
- School type: Public high school
- Established: 2025; 1 year ago
- School district: Agua Fria Union High School District
- Superintendent: Mark Yslas
- Principal: Jason Linn
- Grades: 9th (2025-2026, Planned), 9-12 (Planned)
- Enrollment: 425 (2025-2026), 1700-1800 (Planned)
- Colors: Navy, Kelly Green, and White
- Mascot: Maverick
- Website: Goodyear High School

Goodyear High School is a public high school in Goodyear, Arizona, United States operated by the Agua Fria Union High School District. It was established in 2025 as the district's sixth high school; it started with 425 freshman students on a partially complete campus, with plans to gradually expand facilities and student population to a full high school.

== History ==
=== Site history ===
Originally, the site of the school held the Phoenix Trotting Park, a failed horse-racing track that opened in 1965, closed in 1966, and sat abandoned until its demolition in 2017.

=== Planning and opening ===
Following the growth of the region and resulting increase in student population, the Agua Fria Union High School district was struggling with overcrowding in its schools. Following the passing of the Agua Fria bond in the 2023 Arizona bond election, the district received funding in the range of $145 million to $197 million to address issues including the overcrowding, opting to spend $50 million on the construction of a new sixth campus.

A groundbreaking ceremony was held on the site at the intersection of Cotton Lane and Van Buren in May 2024 in which the school's name and mascot were announced. In attendance were the school's future first principal, Jason Linn. The school's mascot, the Maverick, was both a tribute to the former use of the site and to a local non-profit, the West Valley Mavericks, while naming the high school after the city was meant to thank voters who approved the bond that allowed for the construction and opening of the school. The school colors were announced to be Navy, Kelly Green, and White. Similar to the contemporary plan for the district's existing schools for the 2024-2025 school year, it was announced the school would operate on a mixed academic/career-technical model, offering three academies to students with twelve total pathways that students would choose near the end of their freshman year.

Due to the gradual disbursement of the bond, rather than immediately building the full school, the district plans to build the campus in phases as the initial freshman students advance and a new freshman class enters. Phase one will include classrooms for about 450 freshman students and 52 staff members, sports facilities, a theater, a gym, a cafeteria, a library, a courtyard, and parking. By the final phase, the school plans to have roughly 1700-1800 students; new construction after the initial could increase that to 2100-2200.

On December 3, 2024, the district set the initial boundaries for the school during a board meeting, taking over some areas from the crowded Desert Edge and Verrado High Schools.

The school officially opened to students on August 4, 2025.

== Academics ==
Goodyear High School intends to offer twelve career pathways among three career Academies: Creative Arts and Media, Science, Service and Innovation, and Business, Design and Technology. Those pathways include Film & TV Production, Performing Arts, Visual Arts, Live Entertainment Production, Software & App Design, Marketing, Network Security, Graphic Design, Automation & Robotics, Mental & Social Health Technician, Sports Medicine and Medical Assisting.

== Extracurricular activities ==
The school will start with a freshman football team due to the initial student body only containing freshman students.
