= Canyon View High School (Arizona) =

Public high school in Waddell, Arizona

Location
- 6024 North Perryville Road; Waddell, Arizona 85355; United States; 33°31′26″N 112°27′54″W

Information
- School type: Public high school
- Established: 2018; 8 years ago
- School district: Agua Fria Union High School District
- NCES School ID: 040045003559
- Principal: Lyn Reid
- Teaching staff: 90.30 (on FTE basis)
- Enrollment: 2,004 (2023-2024)
- Student to teacher ratio: 22.19
- Colors: Royal Blue, White, Black
- Athletics conference: AIA
- Mascot: Jaguar
- Team name: Jaguars
- Website: cvhs.aguafria.org

Canyon View High School is a public high school in Waddell, Arizona, United States. Operated by the Agua Fria Union High School District, it is the fifth high school in the district.

Construction on Canyon View High School began in September 2017, following a groundbreaking ceremony in January 2017. Designed by DLR Group, Canyon View features an informal setting, with open and malleable classrooms and a design focused on blurring elements of indoor and outdoor settings together. Canyon View cost a total of $78 million to build, and its campus covers 237,000 ft^{2} (22,000 m^{2}).

Canyon View High School opened in 2018 to a freshman class of 451. As of 2022, the school offers multiple Advanced Placement courses, 23 varsity sports, and various extracurricular activities to its 1,899 students. The school's demographics largely consist of Caucasian and Hispanic and Latino American students.

== History ==
=== Planning and opening ===
Initial plans for a high school in the Waddell area were envisioned as early as 2016, necessitated by overcrowding issues in the Agua Fria Union High School District (AFUHSD), where class sizes were exceeding over 40 students in some classes. In February 2016, the AFUHSD was awarded $33.4 million from the Arizona School Facilities Board. This funding was put at risk with a proposal from the Arizona Senate in April 2016, which altered the formula used to calculate funding.

In January 2017, ground was broken for the first new high school in Waddell in a decade. Contractor Chasse Building Team won the project in February 2017, and the campus was expected to be finished by July 2018. However, construction on Canyon View only began in September 2017, leaving a tight deadline for Chasse. In order to complete the project in time, Chasse divided its team into two independent project teams, and implemented measures to save time. For instance, the concrete and masonry constructors suggested an alteration on two of the five masonry buildings; the team would go vertical with the masonry and then pour the slab onto the buildings, saving six weeks off of the schedule. Canyon View High School opened in 2018 to a freshman class of 451.

In the 2022–23 school year, a new classroom building opened, adding 14 classrooms to the high school to accommodate an enrollment boom.

=== Annexation plans ===
In May 2022, the AFUHSD began working with the city of Buckeye to annex Canyon View into Buckeye, which would allow the district to add a full-time school resource officer to Canyon View through the Buckeye Police Department. Per state law, annexations must involve contiguous land, requiring the city to annex parts of the White Tank Mountains to include Canyon View within Buckeye city limits.

== Campus ==
Canyon View High School was designed by architecture firm DLR Group, who worked closely with the AFUHSD to plan out the school's design. Other companies involved in the project included general contractor Chasse Building Team, plumbing company Universal Piping, masonry company Stone Cold Masonry, engineering company Pueblo Mechanical, roofing company Progressive Roofing, metal and drywall company Pete King, and steel manufacturer Schuff Steel.

Canyon View's campus is unorthodox in nature to a traditional high school, valuing informal settings; teachers do not have fixed classrooms, classes rotate through the school's different spaces, with glass walls separating classrooms. The building's steel and masonry buildings are interwoven with a sprawling outdoor spine known as the "Agora". DLR Group sought to incorporate elements of the outside within the inside, blurring the lines between the two; design lead Pam Loeffelman wrote that the building's "forms and functional adjacencies blur the boundaries between inside and outside, teaching and learning, public and private." A multiuse incubator space known as the "Accelerator" is at the heart of the Agora. Other buildings located in the Agora include an auditorium, a "white box" theater, an exhibition space, a broadcast studio, a makerspace, and an outdoor "learning stair". These buildings are connected using glass airplane hangar doors, and feature adjustable seating, further honing in on the "spatial agility" motif. The Agora also features a series of "Academic Forts", reminiscent of a blanket fort. These spaces are malleable; glass partitions, drapes, sliding doors, and furniture can be adjusted depending on the needs of the student.

DLR Group took the climate of Arizona into consideration, where temperatures during the summer can reach well over 100 degrees. Large photovoltaic solar panels, connected through a 250 kW photovoltaic power system, provide shade to the Agora and accommodate approximately 20% of the school's energy needs. Open and airy spaces are equipped with low-velocity yet high-volume fans. Multiple building materials were strategically placed; the campus's north facing buildings, such as the Academic Forts, use steel frames and plaster exteriors that open to natural light, while buildings on the south side use load-bearing masonry walls. In addition, DLR Group collaborated with Arizona State University to test bio-phase change materials, in an effort to reduce energy consumption and cooling costs. One of the two 30,000-square-foot (2,800 m^{2}) buildings is outfitted with bio phase change materials (PCMs), while the other is not to serve as a control. Preliminary work on bio-PCMs in Arizona dates back to 2008, when Arizona Public Service (APS) experimented with the concept in collaboration with Phase Change Energy Solutions, revealing maximum energy savings of 30%. Bio-PCMs at Canyon View are expected to reduce maximum energy savings at 50%.

A high perimeter fence and over 100 cameras secure the school's campus. During planning, architects sought to implement security measures without compromising the open campus concept. Natural lighting and interior glazing in the school's lobby present an illusion of friendliness, despite an advanced guest check-in system.

Canyon View cost $78 million to build, at a lower cost per square foot than the district's four other schools; $33 million of the total came from the Arizona School Facilities Board, with the remainder of the cost being financed by a voter-approved bond. The campus covers 237,000 ft^{2} (22,000 m^{2}), while its outdoor areas cover 102,835 ft^{2} (9,553.7 m^{2}).

== Academics ==
=== Enrollment ===
Student body composition as of 2021
Race and ethnicity	Total
White	44.2%
Hispanic	41.6%
Black	7.1%
Two or more Races	4.1%
Asian	2.2%
American Indian/Alaska Native	0.6%
Native Hawaiian/Pacific Islander	0.3%
Sex	Total
Male	52%
Female	48%

As of the 2021–2022 school year, Canyon View had an enrollment of 1,899 students and 84.40 teachers (on FTE basis), for a student–teacher ratio of 22.50. As of 2019, 30% of students are on free or reduced lunch. The National Center for Education Statistics reported that in 2021 and 2022, the ethnic demographics of students was 42.2% Caucasian, 41.9% Hispanic and Latino American, 8.3% African American, 2.1% Asian American, and 5.3% other including American Indian, Alaska Native, Native Hawaiian, Pacific Islander American, and multiple raced backgrounds, making up a majority minority. A shift in demographics has occurred since the school's opening in 2018; the percentage of Hispanic and Latino students has increased, while the percentage of Caucasian students has decreased. Likewise, the percentage of African American students has increased, while the percentage of multiple raced students has decreased.

=== Curriculum ===
Canyon View's curriculum typically includes four years of English, mathematics, and three years of laboratory-based sciences and history, consistent with other high schools in the Agua Fria Union High School District. Students also take one year of a foreign language, two years of a fine arts class, and four years of an elective class.

Canyon View offers multiple Advanced Placement (AP) classes, focusing on English, mathematics, science, history, art, and foreign languages. Through Estrella Mountain Community College's dual enrollment program, certain classes at Canyon View allow students to earn college credit concurrently as they take the course. Classes offering dual enrollment include Sports Medicine I and II, Algebra III, AP Biology, Anatomy & Physiology, AP Calculus, AP Statistics, and various agriculture-related classes.

As part of the AFUHSD, sophomores, juniors, and seniors at Verrado can attend online classes through the school. These classes are taken outside of school hours, and a fee is required.

== Extracurricular activities ==
Canyon View High School fields 22 varsity teams, including badminton, track/cross country, football, golf, swimming, volleyball, basketball, soccer, wrestling, baseball/softball, and tennis; additionally, Canyon View has an esports team. These teams compete under the Canyon View Jaguars moniker in the Arizona Interscholastic Association (AIA). In the AIA, the Canyon View Jaguars compete in the 5A conference and in Division II.

== See also ==
- Education in Arizona
