= Phoenix Trotting Park =

Former horse racing track in Goodyear, Arizona

- The Phoenix Trotting Park as seen from I-10 eastbound
- Interactive map of the Phoenix Trotting Park area

General information
- Status: Permanently closed
- Location: Goodyear, Arizona, 17758 W Roosevelt Street
- Coordinates: 33.4574°N 112.4365°W
- Groundbreaking: 1964
- Opened: 1965
- Demolished: 2017
- Cost: $10,000,000

Design and construction
- Architects: Impressa Eugenio Grassetto, Ivone Grassetto, Victor Gruen Associates
- Developer: James Dunnigan
- Main contractor: Gilbert & Dolan Enterprises/E.L. Farmer Construction Co., Inc.

The Phoenix Trotting Park, was a horse racing track built in 1964 in Goodyear, Arizona, United States. It opened in 1965 and was run for about two and a half seasons. The large, futuristically designed structure gave an optimistic look for the 1960s.

Originally planned to be built for a cost of about $3 million, the facility ended up costing around $10 million. One of the proprietors was James Dunnigan, a horse racing financier from New York. Ivone Grassetto, head of Impressa Eugenio Grassetto of Padua, Italy designed the grandstand and the main racing strip. Associate architect was Victor Gruen Associates of Los Angeles. The construction of the facility was undertaken as a joint venture by Gilbert & Dolan Enterprises and E.L. Farmer Construction Company, Inc. Various incentives during the events that were held, such as free parking and admission did initially lead to decent attendance, including an opening day showing of 12,000 people. However, a variety of factors led to the inevitable closing of the track. The hot weather of the desert caused events to be uncomfortable to attendees. The location provided limited means to control rain, leading to floods that caused accessibility problems. The park is also located about 20 miles outside of Phoenix and was built long before any major roads made the area easily accessible to those in the city or its suburbs.

Though closed in 1966, the 194-acre property had been continuously owned by either individuals or corporations/businesses. And with the exception of a brief use for a movie, the property had sat abandoned since its closure. As such, without any care, maintenance, or upkeep, the property showed its age.

The main building of the park was used in the 1998 Charlie/Martin Sheen movie No Code of Conduct. Part of the feature involved a large explosion occurring at the track.

In December 2015, the property was put on the market for $16.5 million. The structure was demolished in 2017.

As of 2024, Goodyear High School is currently being constructed on the former site and plans to open in 2025.

== Gallery ==
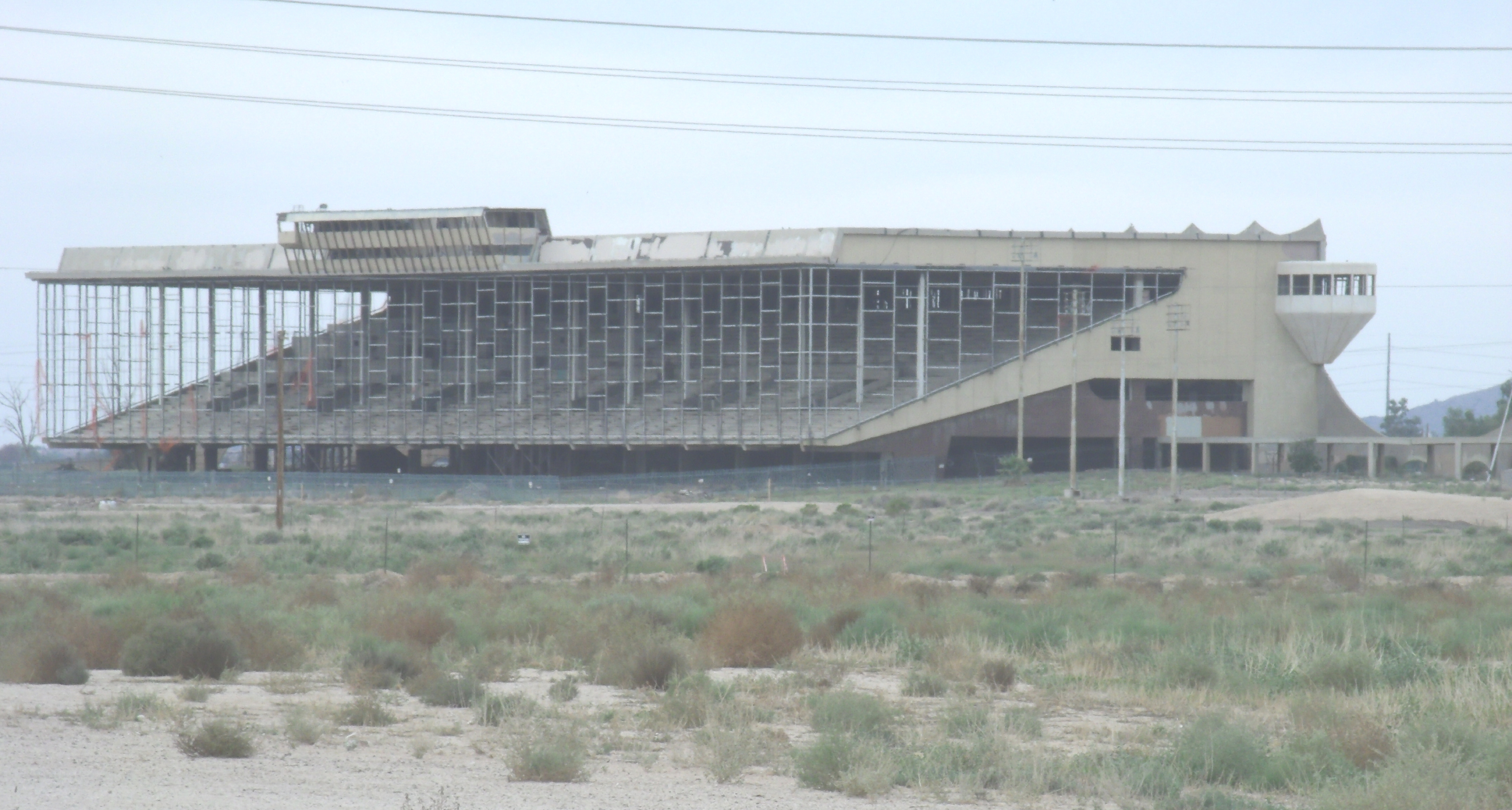
The grandstand

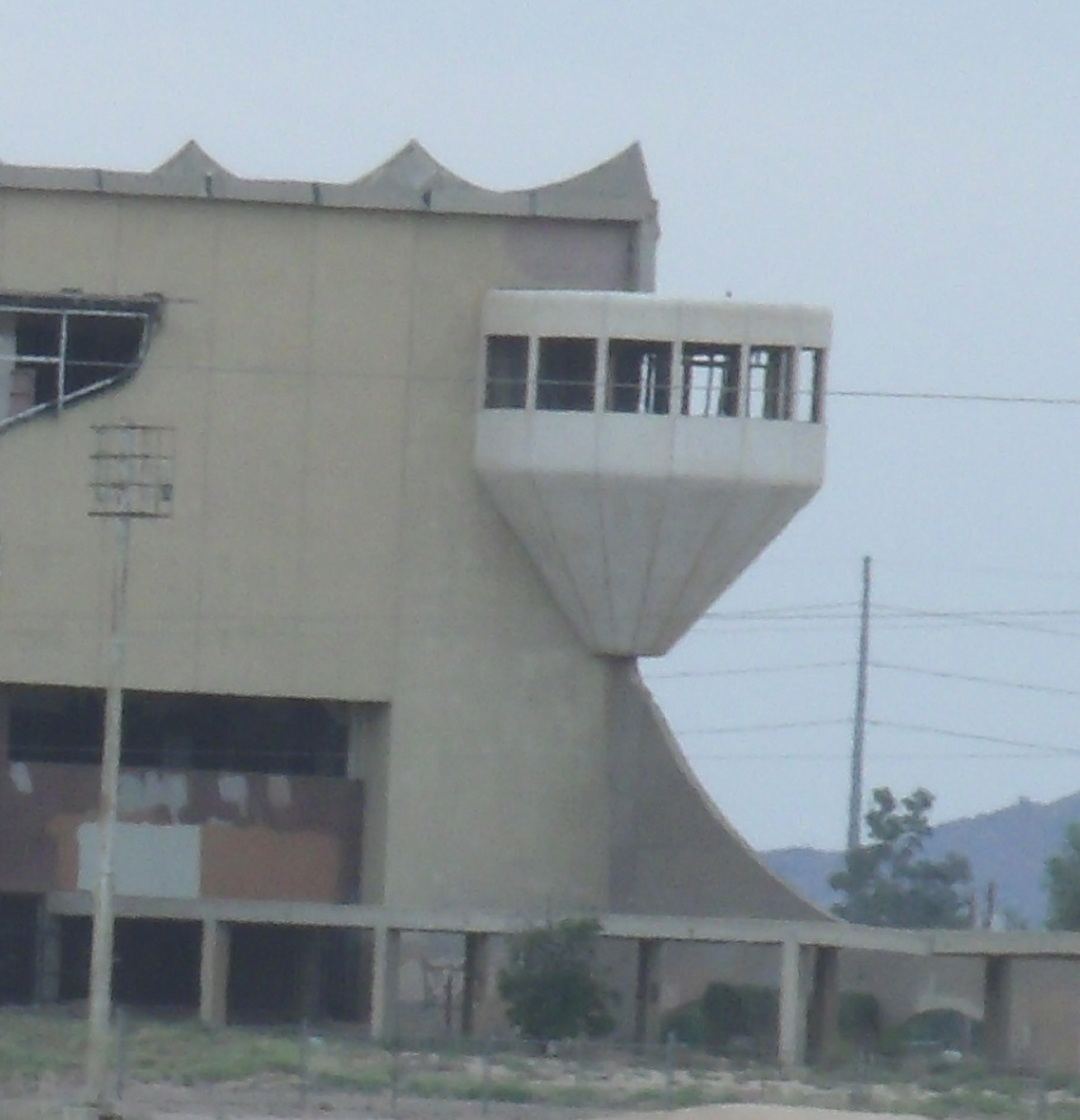
A close up view of a corner detail of a balcony
