= Shawn Gilbert =

American baseball player (born 1965)

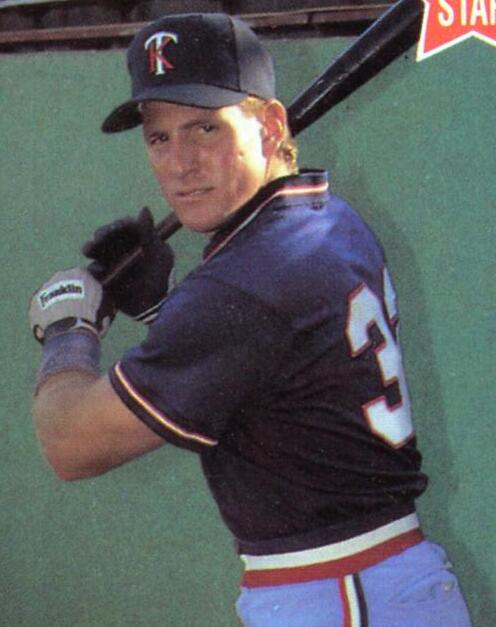
- Gilbert with the Kenosha Twins c. 1988
- Utility player
- Born: March 12, 1965 (age 60); Camden, New Jersey, U.S.
- Batted: Right Threw: Right

MLB debut
- June 2, 1997, for the New York Mets

Last MLB appearance
- July 2, 2000, for the Los Angeles Dodgers

MLB statistics
- Batting average: .149
- Home runs: 2
- Runs batted in: 4

NPB statistics
- Batting average: .267
- Home runs: 6
- Runs batted in: 24
- Stats at Baseball Reference

Teams
- New York Mets (1997–1998); St. Louis Cardinals (1998); Los Angeles Dodgers (2000); Osaka Kintetsu Buffaloes (2001)
Medals
Men's baseball
Representing United States
Pan American Games
Silver medal – second place	1999 Winnipeg	Team
World Junior Baseball Championship
Silver medal – second place	1983 Johnstown	Team

Albert Shawn Gilbert Jr. (born March 12, 1965) is an American former professional baseball player. He attended Agua Fria Union High School in Avondale, Arizona. After high school, he attended Fresno State and Arizona State University.

Gilbert was drafted four times by three different teams-the Dodgers, Reds and Twins, however it was not until their second try the Twins were able to finally sign him in 1987.

The 5'9", 185 pound Gilbert was not too imposing (some sources say he was as small as 170 pounds), but he held his own in the minors by using his small stature to swipe 40 or more bases in 3 out of 4 seasons between 1988 and 1991. He also hit .372 in 43 at-bats with Visalia in 1988.

Gilbert, who batted and threw right-handed, made his major league debut on June 2, 1997.

Over the next few years, he bounced between the majors and minors but ended up swiping only 2 bases in 51 total major league games while hitting just .149.

An interesting fact about Gilbert's MLB career is in 51 games he only had 47 at-bats and scored more runs than he had actual hits. Rarely for someone to appear in 50 or more career games does anyone have more runs than hits and more games than at-bats. Two other examples of this are Charles Gipson and Glen Barker.

His last major league game was July 2, 2000, with the Dodgers.

He ended up retiring from professional baseball in 2003 at the age of 38 after playing for the Osaka Kintetsu Buffaloes in 2001, then in the Dodgers and Pirates farm systems in 2001, 2002, and 2003.

Willie Banks, David West and Jarvis Brown had been teammates of Gilbert for four seasons, longer than any other teammates.

Gilbert is currently the head baseball coach at Servite High School in Anaheim, California.
