= Everson Griffen =

American football player (born 1987)

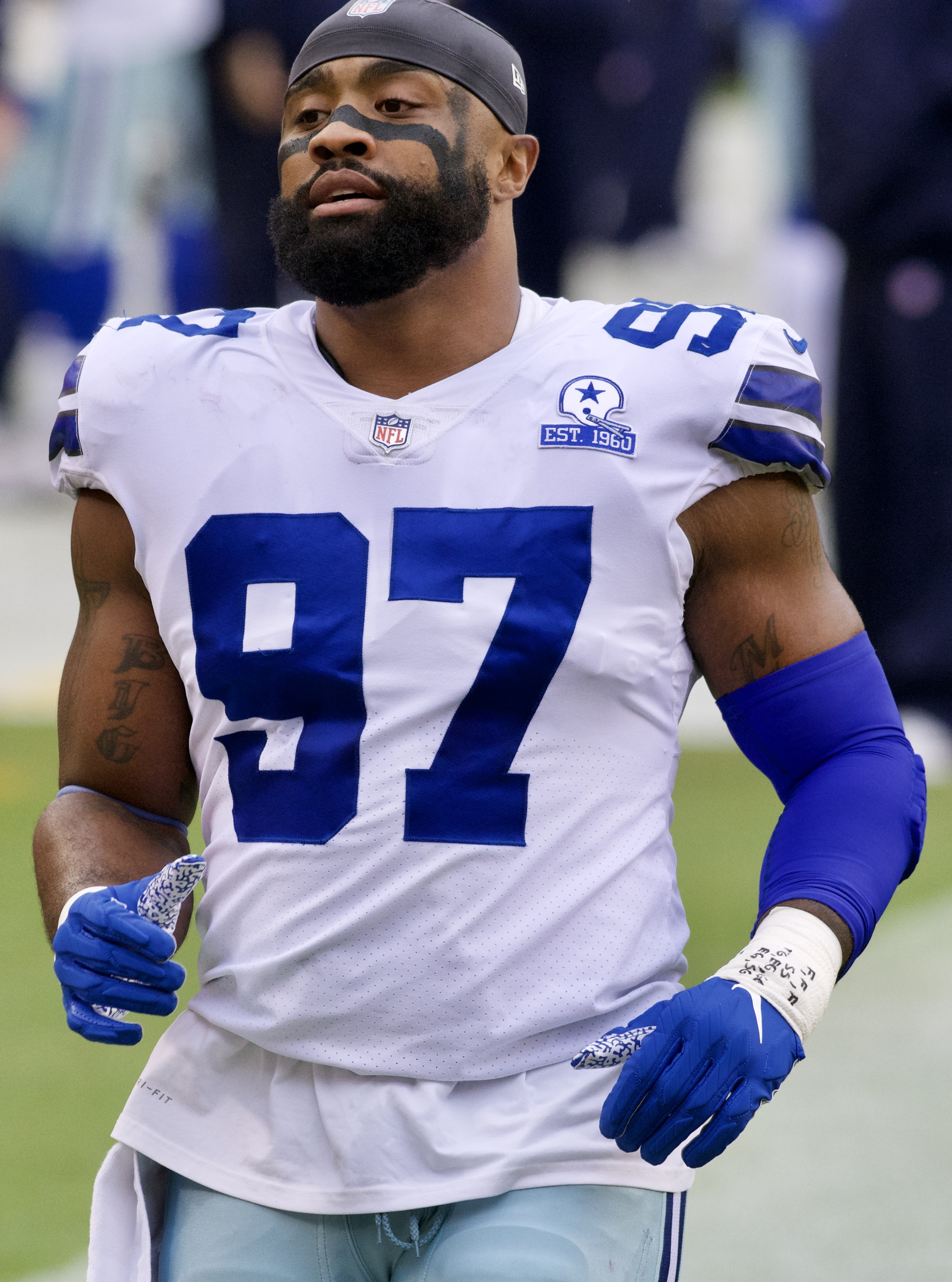
- Griffen with the Dallas Cowboys in 2020

No. 97, 98
- Position: Defensive end

Personal information
- Born: December 22, 1987 (age 38); Avondale, Arizona, U.S.
- Listed height: 6 ft 3 in (1.91 m)
- Listed weight: 273 lb (124 kg)

Career information
- High school: Agua Fria (Avondale)
- College: USC (2007–2009)
- NFL draft: 2010: 4th round, 100th overall pick

Career history
- Minnesota Vikings (2010–2019); Dallas Cowboys (2020); Detroit Lions (2020); Minnesota Vikings (2021)

Awards and highlights
- Second-team All-Pro (2017); 4× Pro Bowl (2015–2017, 2019); Pac-10 Defensive Freshman of the Year (2007); Second-team All-Pac-10 (2009)

Career NFL statistics
- Total tackles: 403
- Sacks: 85.5
- Forced fumbles: 10
- Fumble recoveries: 6
- Interceptions: 2
- Pass deflections: 20
- Defensive touchdowns: 2
- Stats at Pro Football Reference

Everson Griffen (born December 22, 1987) is an American former professional football player who was a defensive end in the National Football League (NFL). A graduate of Agua Fria High School, Griffen played college football for the USC Trojans. He was selected by the Minnesota Vikings in the fourth round of the 2010 NFL draft and played for them for 10 seasons before signing with the Dallas Cowboys in 2020. He was traded to the Detroit Lions later that year, then re-signed with the Vikings in August 2021.

== Early life ==
Griffen attended Agua Fria High School in Avondale, Arizona, the same high school as Vikings Hall of Famer Randall McDaniel. At Agua Fria, Griffen played as a defensive lineman and running back for the Owls high school football team.

As a junior, he rushed for 794 yards on 142 carries for eight touchdowns, and had 12 receptions for 168 yards and one 71-yard reception where he outraced everybody for a score. On defense, he was double and triple-teamed but still managed 47 tackles, five sacks and three fumble recoveries.

As a senior, Griffen recorded 77 tackles, 16 sacks and a fumble recovery as a defensive end and ran for 1,251 yards on 159 carries (7.9 avg.) with 20 touchdowns and had 6 receptions with 2 touchdowns as a running back. His 2006 senior season honors included Super Prep Player of the Year, Scout.com Player of the Year, Parade All-American, EA Sports All-American first-team, Super Prep All-American, Prep Star All-American, Scout.com All-American, Lemming All-American, Super Prep Elite 50, Prep Star 100, Rivals.com 100, Super Prep All-Farwest, Prep Star All-West, Scout.com All-West, Long Beach Press-Telegram Best in the West first-team, Orange County Register Fab 15 first-team, Arizona Republic All Arizona, West Valley View First-team, Tacoma News-Tribune Western 100 and Gatorade Arizona Player of the Year.

Also a standout track & field athlete, Griffen was one of the state's top performers in the throwing events. At the 2007 4A I State Meet, he won both the shot put and discus events. He recorded top throws of 17.67 meters (58 feet) in the shot put and 55.11 meters (180 feet, 8 inches) in the discus. Following his junior season, he attended the 2005 Arizona summer camp, where he ran a 4.46-second 40-yard dash at 6-foot-4 and about 260 pounds, which earned him the nickname "the Freak" and led to comparisons to All-Pro defensive end Jevon Kearse. Griffen also earned first-team all-region honors in basketball.

=== Recruiting ===
Following his high school career, Griffen was selected to play in the 2007 U.S. Army All-American Bowl along with fellow USC recruits Marc Tyler, Kristofer O'Dowd, Joe McKnight, and Chris Galippo. During the recruiting process, he took official visits to USC, Michigan, Notre Dame, Oregon, UCLA, and Florida before committing to the Trojans on November 24, 2006.

== College career ==
=== Freshman season (2007) ===
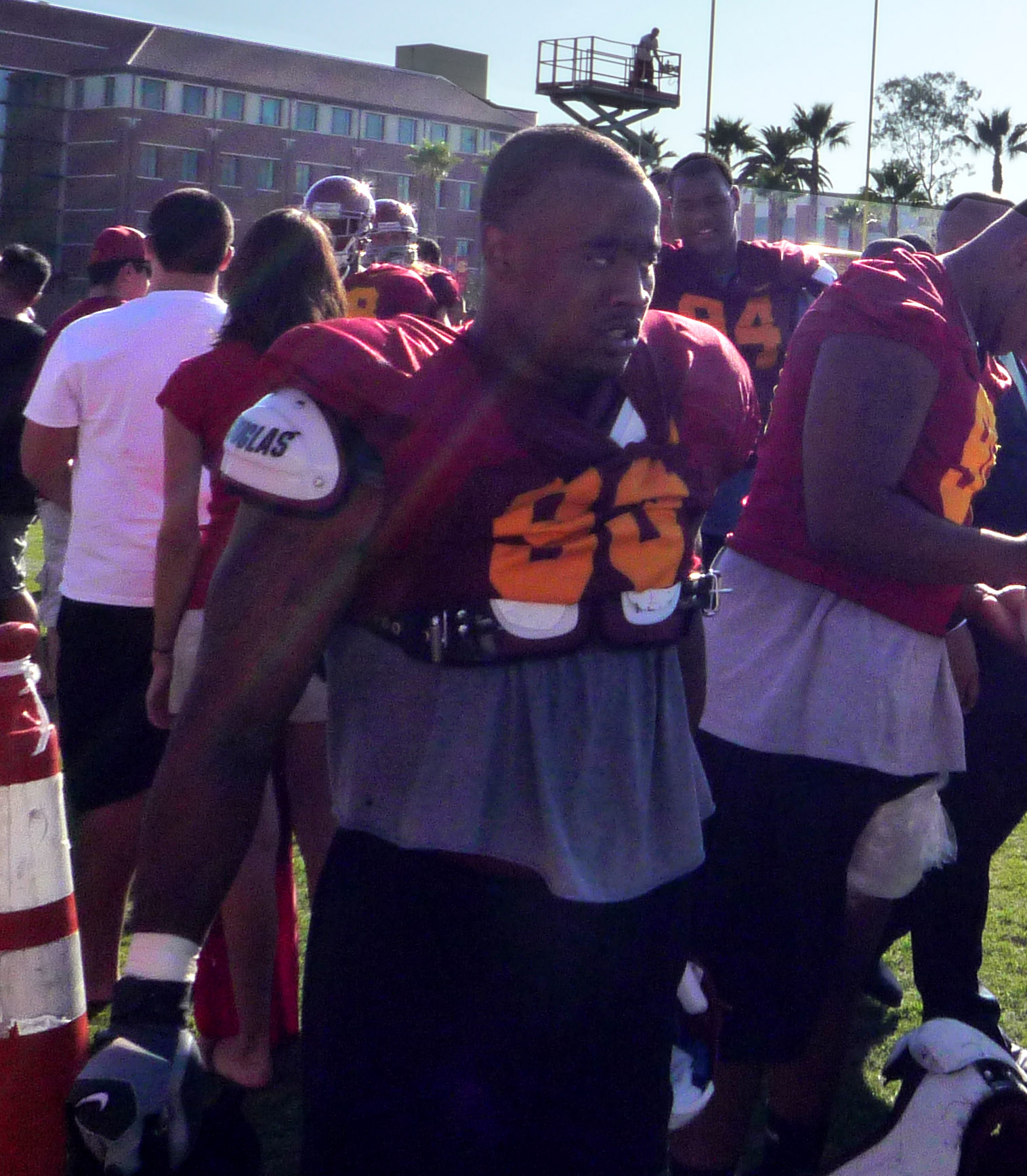
Griffen after a 2008 preseason fall practice

Griffen had an impressive showing as a first-year true freshman backup defensive end in 2007, playing primarily in pass rushing situations. Overall, in 2007, while appearing in all 13 games (2 starts), he totaled 21 tackles, including 5.5 for losses of 30 yards (all were sacks), two forced fumbles, one fumble recovery and two pass deflections. He became the first USC true freshman to start an opener on the defensive line in 21 seasons since Tim Ryan in 1986 against Illinois and the first true freshman to start on the defensive line since Shaun Cody did so in 2001 against Utah.

In the Trojans' 24–3 victory over Oregon State on November 3, Griffen posted six tackles and a career-high 3.5 of USC's nine total sacks to earn Rivals.com National Freshman of the Week honors. On November 22, he had six tackles, one sack, and one fumble recovery that set up a USC touchdown at Arizona State. For his season efforts in 2007, he was named to the Freshman All-American first-team by the, Sporting News, Football Writers Association of America, Rivals.com, and Scout.com, and Collegefootballnews.com Freshman All-American second-team. He was also the Sporting News Pac-10 Defensive Freshman of the Year and was an All-Pac-10 honorable mention pick.

=== Sophomore season (2008) ===
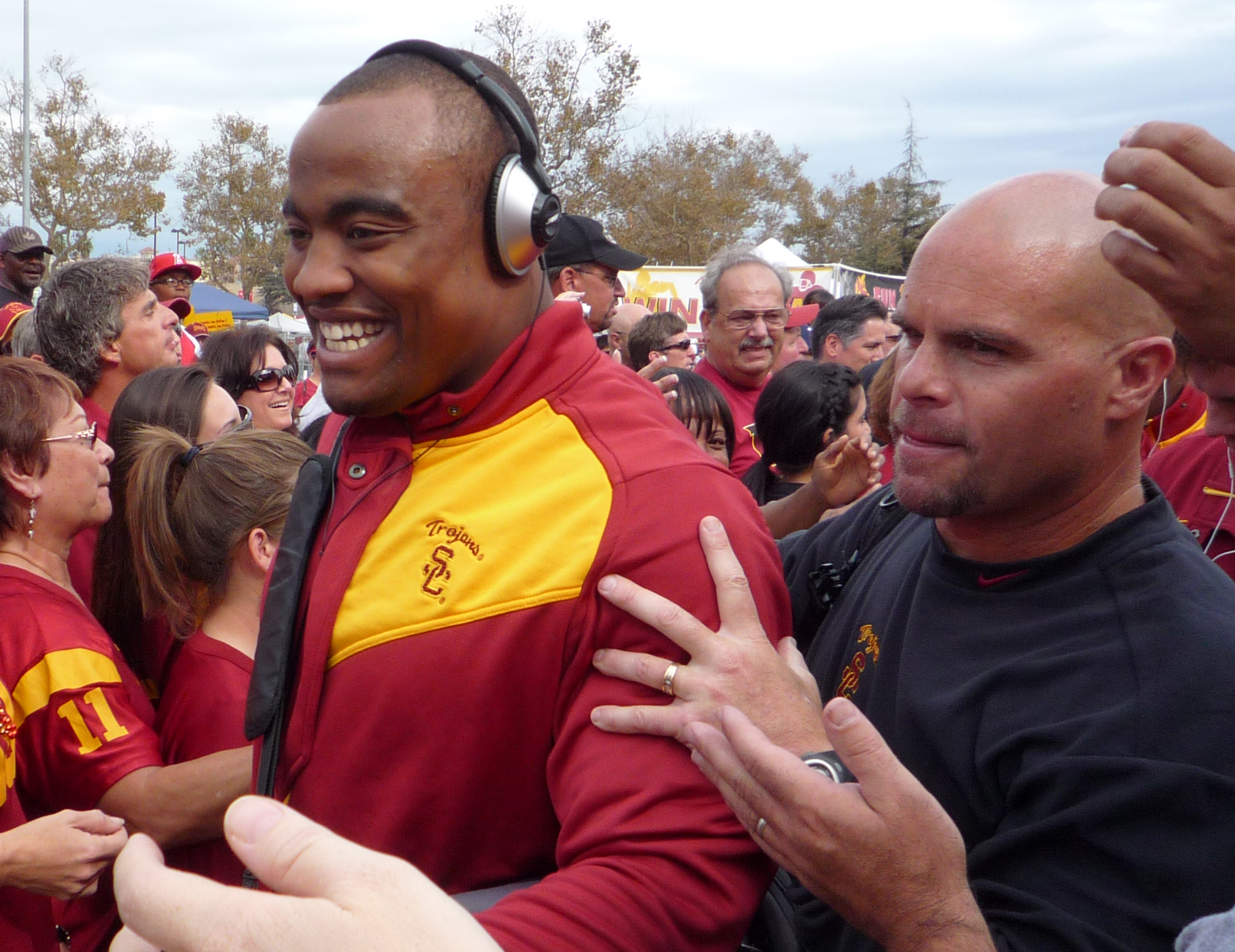
Griffen heading into Notre Dame Stadium with then-defensive coor. Nick Holt.

In the fall practice before his freshman season, Griffen and veteran defensive end Kyle Moore got into heated competition that culminated with a fight during practice; the two reconciled and are now friends. During spring practices, former USC coach Pete Carroll staged a prank by having the Los Angeles Police Department enter a team meeting and arrest Griffen for “physically abusing a freshman” (Trojans offensive guard Matt Meyer); Griffen was previously aware of the prank.

In his sophomore year in 2008, Griffen was USC's pass rush specialist as a backup defensive end. He appeared in all 12 games (all but Washington State, missed due to illness) and started the first three games (Virginia, Ohio State and Oregon State) for the Trojans, compiling 18 tackles, including 6 for losses of 43 yards (with 4.5 sacks for minus 39 yards). He had three tackles against Oregon State and California and two tackles against Virginia, Ohio State, Oregon and Stanford (1.5 for losses).

=== Junior season (2009) ===
On July 4, 2009, at a Fourth of July party on Nantucket Island, Griffen and a teammate, linebacker Jordan Campbell, were cited by the Nantucket Police Department for a noise violation; no charges were filed and the two agreed to write a letter of apology. Overall, he finished the 2009 season with 45 total tackles, eight sacks, one pass defensed, and one forced fumble.

In 2009, Griffen was second-team All-Pac-10.

== Professional career ==
After USC's 24–13 victory over Boston College in the 2009 Emerald Bowl, Griffen announced he would forgo his final year of eligibility and enter the 2010 NFL draft. At the 2010 NFL Scouting Combine, Griffen (who measured at 6'3 3/8", 273-lb) put on a show, running an electronic-timed 4.66 in the 40-yard dash and bench-pressing 225 lbs 32 times. His 40 time was second among defensive lineman, while his 32 reps were tied for sixth-best. Entering his Pro Day workout as one of the most scrutinized prospects in the NFL draft, Griffen lived up to his nickname as "the Freak," posting a 34-inch vertical jump, 9-foot-7 broad jump and 40-yard dash time of 4.59 seconds, though some scouts had his second run as low as 4.46.

External videos
- Griffen runs the 40 at his Pro Day
- Griffen gets drafted by Minnesota

Pre-draft measurables
Height	Weight	Arm length	Hand span	40-yard dash	10-yard split	20-yard split	20-yard shuttle	Three-cone drill	Vertical jump	Broad jump	Bench press
6 ft 3 3/8 in (1.91 m)	273 lb (124 kg)	32 5/8 in (0.83 m)	10 in (0.25 m)	4.59 s	1.63 s	2.66 s	4.36 s	7.25 s	34.0 in (0.86 m)	9 ft 7 in (2.92 m)	32 reps
All values from NFL Combine and Pro Day

=== Minnesota Vikings (first stint) ===
==== 2010 season ====
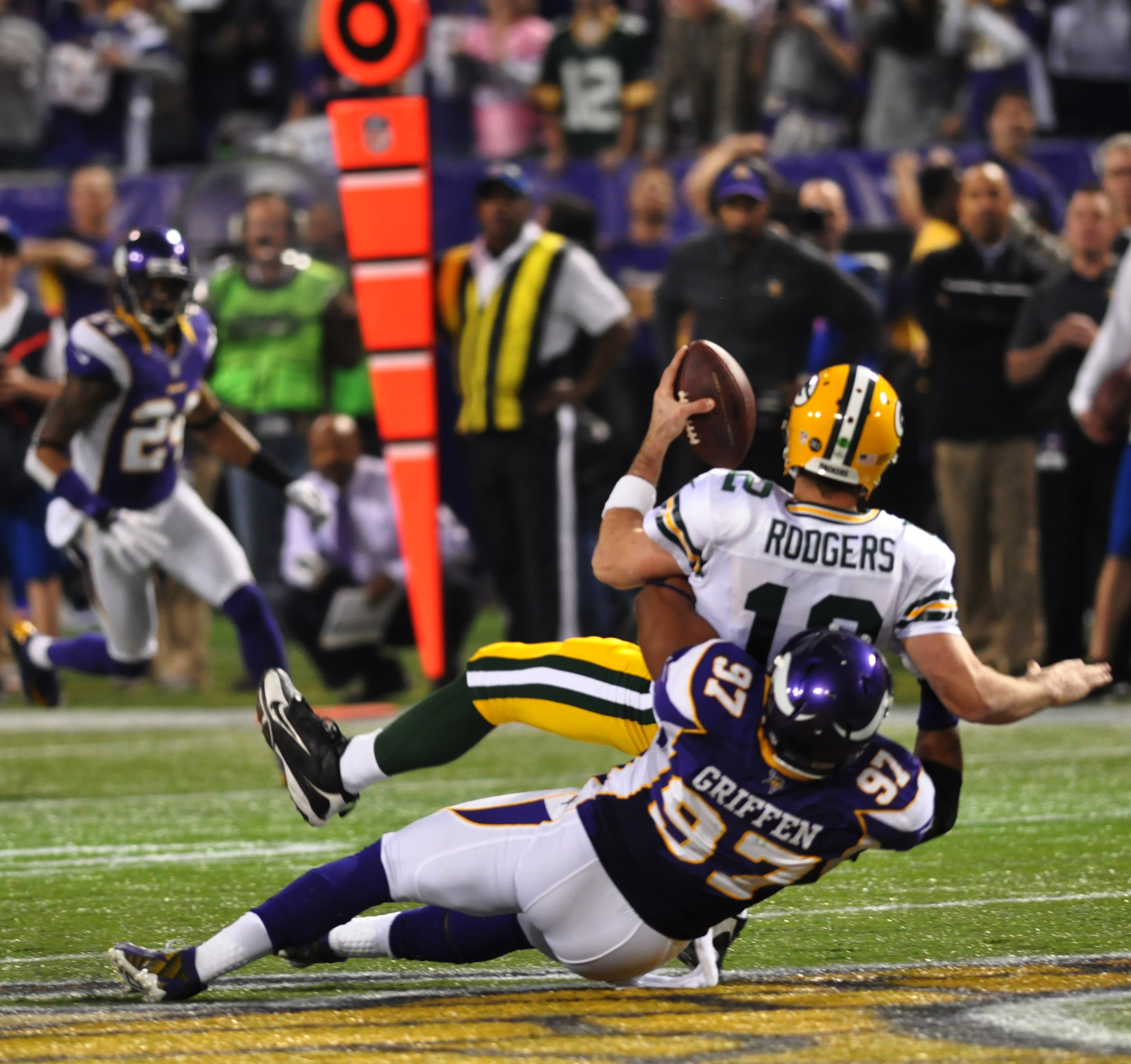
Aaron Rodgers sacked by Griffen, 2012

Griffen was selected by the Minnesota Vikings with the second pick in the fourth round of the 2010 NFL draft, becoming the 100th player selected overall. After being inactive for the opening five games of the season, he played in the final 11 games, finishing his rookie year with 11 tackles, all of them solo. On January 28, 2011, Griffen was arrested in Los Angeles for public intoxication. Three days later, he was arrested again after he was found driving with an invalid drivers license. He then tried to flee on foot only to be tased.

==== 2011 season ====
In his second season, Griffen played in all 16 games for the Vikings, mostly on special teams as a gunner on punt coverage at times as well as serving as a regular on return units, helping the Vikings special teams unit set a team record with a 26.9 kickoff return average for the season and tied for first in the NFL with four kickoff returns of +50 yards. His 4 sacks on the year ranked fourth on the team and contributed to the Vikings 50 total sacks on the season, tied for first in the NFL. His 18 special teams tackles ranked second on the team behind team-leader Eric Frampton, who posted four more. In Week 2 against the Tampa Bay Buccaneers, he notched his first career sack when he brought down quarterback Josh Freeman.

==== 2012 season ====
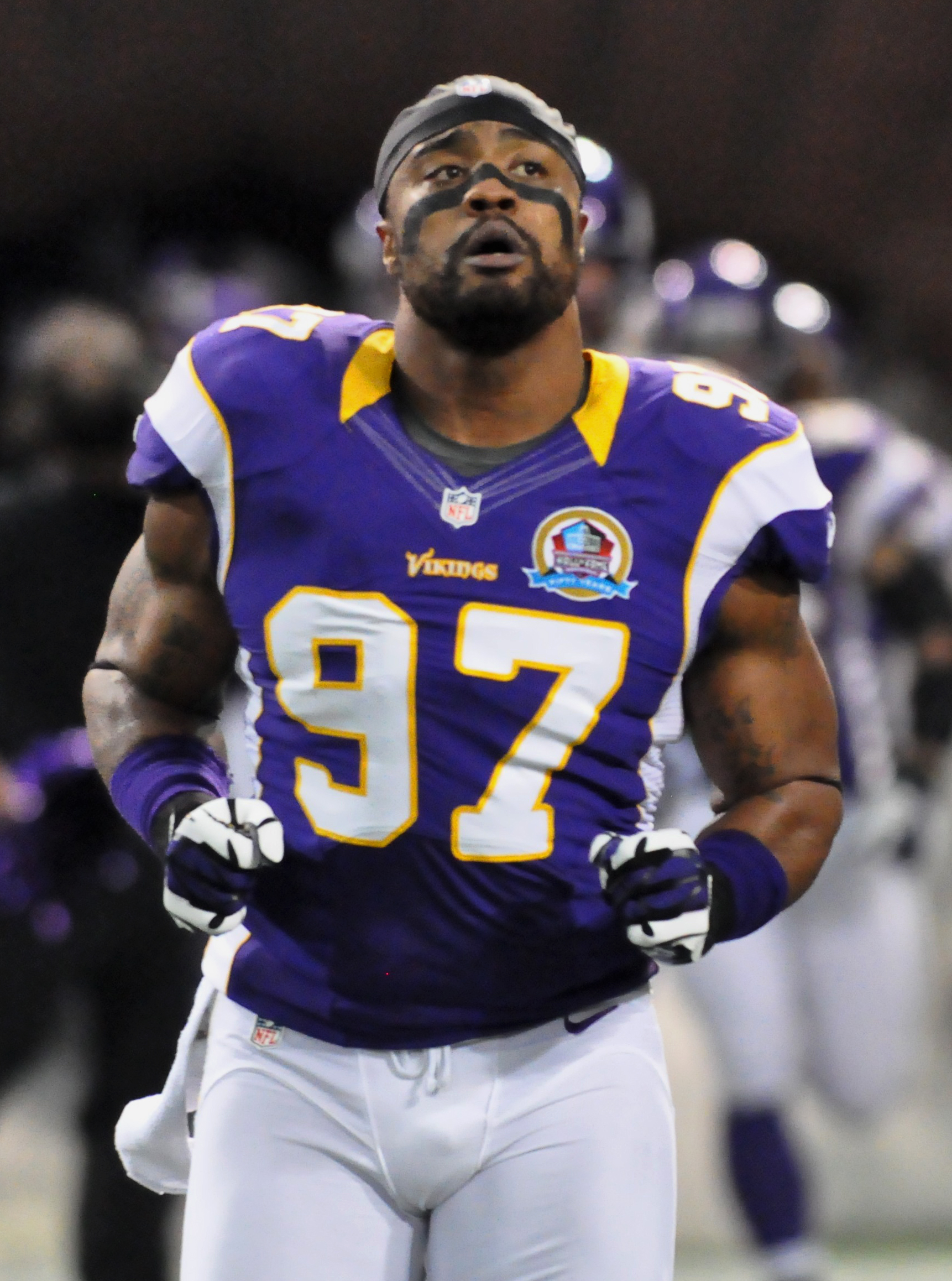
Griffen in 2012

After a quiet performance early in the 2012 season, he came on strong late in the season, posting five sacks, one interception returned for a touchdown, and 16 quarterback hurries in the final seven games. His first sack of the year came in Week 2 as he brought down Andrew Luck for a 22-yard loss against the Indianapolis Colts. It was the third-longest sack in team history. On October 11, 2012, Griffen was given an indefinite leave from the team after his mother died.

In week 15 against the St. Louis Rams, Griffen scored his first career touchdown on his first career interception, taking to the house a Sam Bradford pass 29 yards for the score in a key victory for the Vikings' playoff chances. His 29-yard interception return touchdown ranks as the fourth-longest in Vikings history by a defensive lineman. The following week, he earned his first career start in a road game against the Houston Texans, finishing the game with a solo tackle. On December 30, he posted a career-best 3 sacks against the Green Bay in the regular season finale win over the Packers that gave the Vikings a playoff berth. He had a tackle and a sack in his playoff debut at Green Bay in the Wild Card Round.

==== 2013 season ====
In 2013, Griffen was used all over the defensive line, playing in all 16 games with no starts. He finished the 2013 season with 5.5 sacks, including 2.5 in the final two games of the regular season. On September 29, he recorded the game-winning strip-sack on Ben Roethlisberger against the Pittsburgh Steelers in the NFL International Series game at London.

In Week 2 in a road game against the Chicago Bears, he tipped a Jay Cutler pass that led to a Kevin Williams interception in the endzone for a touchback. He recorded a season-best six tackles and tied a career-high with 3 tackles for loss in a loss against the Cincinnati Bengals. He ended the season with 27 tackles (18 solo), 5.5 sacks and a forced fumble.

==== 2014 season ====
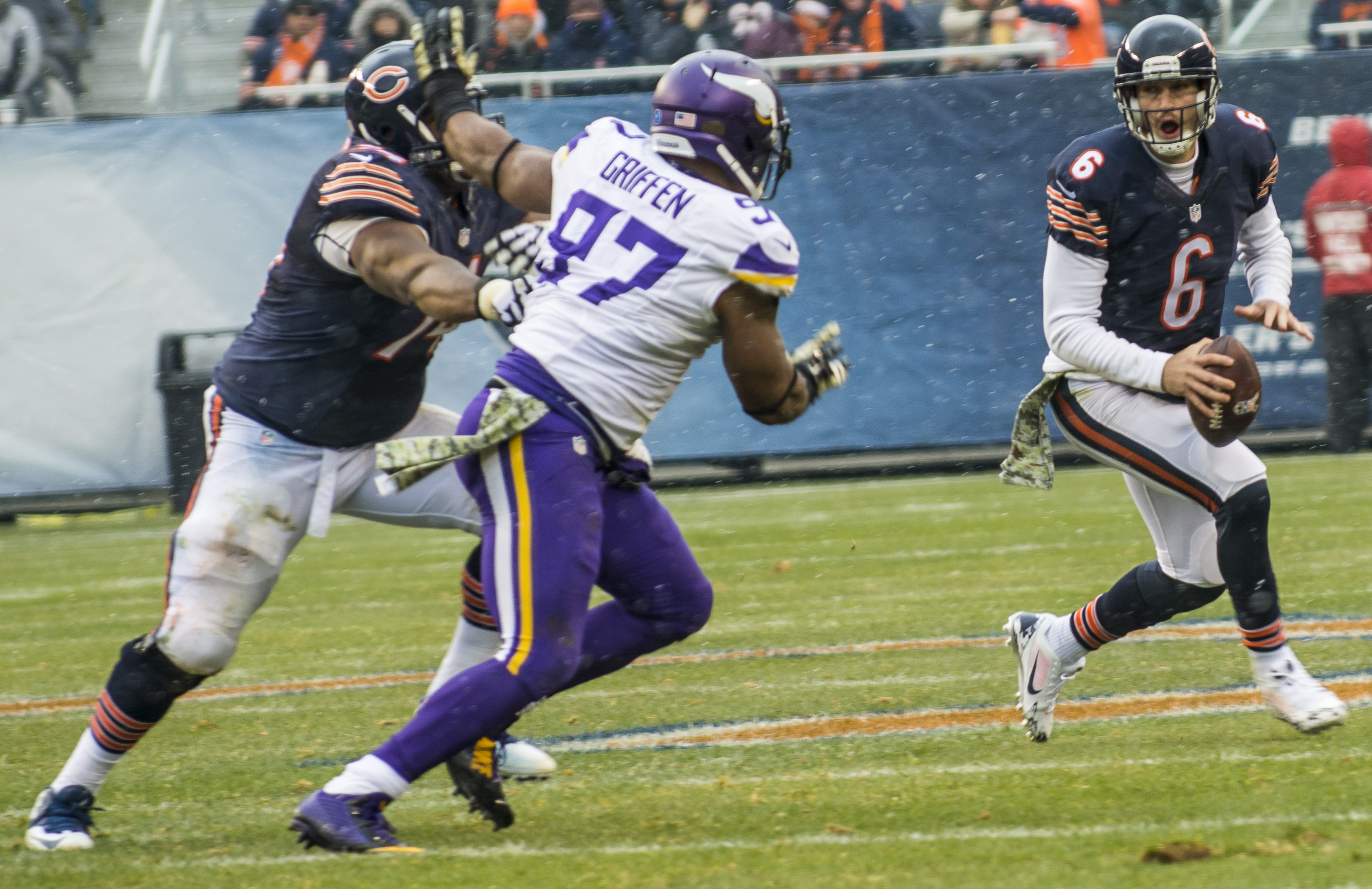
Griffen rushing Jay Cutler, 2014

On March 9, 2014, Griffen re-signed with the Vikings on a five-year contract worth $42.5 million, including $20 million guaranteed. He enjoyed a breakout season in his first year as a full-time starter, helping the Vikings revamped defense have the most improved defense in the NFL. He started all 16 games after entering the season with one start in his first four seasons with the Vikings. On October 19, Griffen had a career day against the Buffalo Bills in Week 7 when he recorded a career-high nine tackles and tied a career-high with 3 sacks.

He was named NFC Defensive Player of the Month in October after recording six sacks and a forced fumble in just four games. In Week 13 against the Carolina Panthers, Griffen returned a Jasper Brinkley blocked punt for 43 yards for a touchdown, making it the longest blocked punt returned by a Vikings player in franchise history. Griffen ended his breakout season with 57 combined tackles (41 solo), one forced fumble, one blocked punt for a touchdown, three passes defensed, and a career-best 12 sacks, which led the team and tied for ninth-best in the league.

==== 2015 season ====
On October 18, 2015, Griffen missed the game against the Kansas City Chiefs due to an illness. Griffen was selected as the NFC Defensive Player of the Week for Week 17, becoming the third Vikings player to win the NFC Defensive Player of the Week award in 2015, joining nose tackle Linval Joseph and cornerback Terence Newman. In the game against the Green Bay Packers, Griffen registered two sacks on Aaron Rodgers, including a strip-sack that was recovered by cornerback Captain Munnerlyn, who returned it for a 55-yard touchdown in the Vikings' 20–13 win; in addition, he also added four quarterback hits and six tackles, three of which were for a loss.

Griffen ended his second year as a starter tied for fourth in the NFC and twelfth in the league with 10.5 sacks, becoming the first player in a Mike Zimmer defense ever to record double-digit sacks in back-to-back seasons (he had 12 in 2014). On January 14, Griffen was picked to take the place of Houston's defensive end J. J. Watt in the 2016 NFL Pro Bowl, marking his first career invitation to the annual showcase game in Hawaii.

==== 2016 season ====
On September 18, Minnesota opened their new stadium with a win against division rival Green Bay Packers and Griffen contributed with a sack and a forced fumble. In the Vikings' upset of the 1–1 Carolina Panthers in Week 3, Griffen tied a career-high with 3 sacks for losses of a combined 37 yards as the Vikings sacked Cam Newton a total of eight times, which tied the team's third-highest total in a road game and was the most since 2003. On September 28, Griffen was named NFC Defensive Player of the Week, joining John Randle and Chris Doleman as the only Vikings defensive linemans to win a Defensive Player of the Week Award in consecutive seasons.

In the Vikings' 31–13 win over the Houston Texans in Week 5, Griffen sacked Brock Osweiler two times, but both sacks were negated due to penalties. Griffin recorded a strip sack of Dak Prescott but the Vikings lost to the Dallas Cowboys. Griffen had a strong performance in the Vikings' 25–16 win over the Jacksonville Jaguars in Week 14; on the Jaguars second possession of the game, Griffen was able to get around the edge and sacked Blake Bortles for a loss of six yards. His second sack of the game came after halftime when he cut back in to the middle and got to Bortles for a six-yard loss. On that same drive, he batted down a ball intended for Jaguars running back Corey Grant. He finished the season with 48 total tackles, 22 quarterback hits, eight sacks, one pass defensed, and two forced fumbles. Griffen was ranked 92nd by his peers on the NFL Top 100 Players of 2017.

==== 2017 season ====
On July 26, 2017, Griffen signed a four-year, $58 million contract extension ($34 million guaranteed) with the Vikings through the 2022 season. He was named NFC Defensive Player of the Month in October. Griffen recorded at least one sack in each of the Vikings first eight games and is on pace to break his own record of 12 sacks, a mark he got in the 2014 season. Only Jim Marshall and Jared Allen hold the Vikings record for a sack in at least eight straight games; Marshall achieved it in 1969, Allen in 2011.

On December 19, 2017, Griffen was named to his third straight Pro Bowl. In the Vikings' Divisional Playoff game against the New Orleans Saints, Griffen tipped a Drew Brees pass that ended up being intercepted by teammate Anthony Barr. The Vikings went on to win 29–24 and advance to the NFC Championship, where their season ended against the Philadelphia Eagles. He was ranked #19 by his fellow players on the NFL Top 100 Players of 2018.

==== 2018 season ====
Griffen played in 11 games in the 2018 season. After playing in the first two games, he missed five games due to a personal matter. He finished with 5.5 sacks, 33 total tackles, five quarterback hits, and one pass defensed.

==== 2019 season ====
Griffen made his return to football in week 1 against the Atlanta Falcons. In the game, Griffen sacked Matt Ryan once in the 28–12 win. In week 3 against the Oakland Raiders, Griffen recorded a sack on Derek Carr in the 34–14 win. In Week 6 against the Philadelphia Eagles, Griffen recorded his second career interception off a pass thrown by Eagles kicker Jake Elliott on a fake field-goal attempt.

On January 21, 2020, Griffen was named to the 2020 Pro Bowl to replace Nick Bosa since the latter's team (San Francisco 49ers) made it to Super Bowl LIV. It was the 4th time Griffen had been selected to the Pro Bowl in his career.

On February 20, 2020, Griffen opted out of his contract, making him a free agent at the start of the new league year on March 18.

=== Dallas Cowboys ===
On August 16, 2020, Griffen signed a one-year contract with the Dallas Cowboys. Days after signing with Dallas, Griffen said the reason that he chose them was because he grew up a Cowboys fan and was named after legendary Cowboys defensive back Everson Walls. His arrival generated a great expectation that he could be part of a formidable pass-rushing unit along with defensive ends DeMarcus Lawrence, Aldon Smith and Randy Gregory.

In Week 2 against the Atlanta Falcons, Griffen recorded his first sack with the Cowboys on Matt Ryan late in the fourth quarter to help the team rally from a nine-point deficit and win 40–39. On October 27, because of the struggles experienced by the defense as a unit, he was moved as part of a roster purge that included free agency acquisitions Dontari Poe and Daryl Worley. He made seven appearances (no starts), 20 tackles (at the time tied for ninth on the team), 2.5 sacks (at the time second on the team), one tackle for loss and 12 quarterback pressures (at the time third on the team).

=== Detroit Lions ===
On October 27, 2020, the Cowboys traded Griffen to the Lions in exchange for a conditional sixth-round pick (#192-Quinton Bohanna) in the 2021 NFL draft. In Week 10 against the Washington Football Team, Griffen recorded his first quarterback hurry with the Lions on Alex Smith during the 30–27 win. Griffen was placed on the reserve/COVID-19 list by the team on December 12, and activated on December 23. He registered two starts in seven games, 13 tackles (four for loss), 3.5 sacks, eight quarterback hits and three passes defensed.

=== Minnesota Vikings (second stint) ===
On August 23, 2021, Griffen signed a deal with the Minnesota Vikings. He was a part of initial roster cuts on August 31, but re-signed with the team on September 2. Griffen suffered a concussion on September 18, after crashing his car while swerving to avoid a deer in the road. He was subsequently ruled out for Week 2. On November 26, Griffen was placed on the non-football illness list under dealing with a personal mental health issue earlier in the week.

== Career statistics ==
=== NFL ===
==== Regular season ====
Legend
	Led the league
**Bold**	Career high

Year	Team	Games		Tackles					Interceptions						Fumbles			
Year	Team	GP	GS	Comb	Solo	Ast	Sck	Sfty	PD	Int	Yds	Avg	Lng	TD	FF	FR	Yds	TD
2010	MIN	11	0	11	11	0	0.0	—	0	0	0	0.0	0	0	0	0	0	0
2011	MIN	**16**	0	21	15	6	4.0	—	2	0	0	0.0	0	0	1	1	9	0
2012	MIN	**16**	1	27	24	3	8.0	—	2	**1**	**29**	**29.0**	**29**	**1**	1	2	5	0
2013	MIN	**16**	0	27	18	9	5.5	—	0	0	0	0.0	0	0	1	0	0	0
2014	MIN	**16**	**16**	**58**	**41**	**17**	12.0	—	3	0	0	0.0	0	0	1	0	0	0
2015	MIN	15	15	44	34	10	10.5	—	**4**	0	0	0.0	0	0	1	0	0	0
2016	MIN	**16**	**16**	48	36	12	8.0	—	1	0	0	0.0	0	0	2	**3**	**20**	**1**
2017	MIN	15	15	45	31	14	**13.0**	—	1	0	0	0.0	0	0	**3**	0	0	0
2018	MIN	11	10	33	22	11	5.5	—	1	0	0	0.0	0	0	0	0	0	0
2019	MIN	15	15	41	26	15	8.0	—	2	**1**	17	17.0	17	0	0	0	0	0
2020	DAL	7	0	20	10	10	2.5	—	**1**	0	0	0.0	0	0	0	0	0	0
2020	DET	7	2	13	8	5	3.5	—	**3**	0	0	0.0	0	0	0	0	0	0
2021	MIN	9	6	15	10	5	5.0	—	0	0	0	0.0	0	0	0	0	0	0
Career		170	96	403	286	117	85.5	—	20	2	46	23.0	29	1	10	6	34	1

==== Postseason ====
Year	Team	Games		Tackles					Interceptions						Fumbles			
Year	Team	GP	GS	Comb	Solo	Ast	Sck	Sfty	PD	Int	Yds	Avg	Lng	TD	FF	FR	Yds	TD
2012	MIN	1	0	1	1	0	1.0	—	0	0	0	0.0	0	0	0	0	0	0
2015	MIN	1	1	**6**	**4**	**2**	1.0	—	0	0	0	0.0	0	0	0	0	0	0
2017	MIN	**2**	**2**	4	**4**	0	1.0	—	**1**	0	0	0.0	0	0	**1**	0	0	0
2019	MIN	**2**	**2**	**6**	**4**	**2**	**1.5**	—	0	0	0	0.0	0	0	0	0	0	0
Career		6	5	17	13	4	4.5	—	1	0	0	0.0	0	0	1	0	0	0

=== College ===
Season	Team	GP	GS	Interceptions						Fumbles											
Season	Team	GP	GS	Season	Team	GP	GS	Comb	Total	Ast	Sck	Tfl	PDef	Int	Yds	Avg	Lng	TDs	FF	FR	FR YDS
2007	USC	13	2	21	15	6	5.5	5.5	2	0	0	0	0	0	2	0	0				
2008	USC	12	3	18	11	7	4.5	6	0	0	0	0	0	0	0	0	0				
2009	USC	13	11	45	22	23	8	9.5	1	0	0	0	0	0	1	1	9				
Total		38	16	84	48	36	18	21	3	0	0	0	0	0	3	1	9				

== Personal life ==
Griffen and his wife, Tiffany, have three sons. Their oldest son, Greyson, was born in 2013 and their second son, Ellis, was born in 2015. Their third and youngest son, Sebastian Gregory, was born on November 23, 2017.

On Thursday, September 20, 2018, Griffen and his agent were sent a letter from the Minnesota Vikings, stating that he would not be allowed back with the team until he underwent a mental health evaluation. Two days later, on Saturday, September 22, Griffen was involved in an incident at Hotel Ivy where he had allegedly threatened to shoot someone because he was not allowed in his room. On September 25, 2018, it was revealed that Griffen was taken to the hospital for a mental health evaluation.

Early on the morning of November 24, 2021, Griffen called 911, claiming that intruders were attempting to enter his home. He posted several videos on Instagram, in which he showed a pistol that he claimed his teammate Dalvin Cook had helped him purchase. Police were unable to find any intruders in the vicinity of Griffen's residence, but Griffen initially refused to leave his home; after several hours of contact with both law enforcement and team psychologists from the Vikings, he finally left his home around 2:30 PM CST (20:30 UTC), and was transported to a health care facility. On December 3, 2021, Griffen revealed that he had been diagnosed with bipolar disorder.

On July 23, 2023, Griffen was arrested in Chanhassen, Minnesota, for 4th degree driving under the influence (DWI). Griffen was booked in the Carver County Jail and was released an hour later.

On May 30, 2024, Griffen was arrested for DWI and cocaine possession in Minneapolis, Minnesota after driving 82 MPH in a 55 MPH zone. This would be Griffen's second DWI charge within the past year. In addition, Griffen also had two petty misdemeanor convictions between the time of his two as well, including for in incident on October 28, 2023, where he crashed his car into a fence and gazebo in Mound, Minnesota and for an incident on December 7, 2023, where he was driving 55 in a 30 speed zone. In his plea deal for his second petty misdemeanor conviction, Griffen had his driver's license revoked and was ordered to commit no alcohol-related or careless driving offenses.
