= West Valley (Phoenix metropolitan area) =

Region within Maricopa County, Arizona

Coordinates: 33.58°N 112.28°W

The West Valley is a region within the Phoenix metropolitan area, in central Arizona.

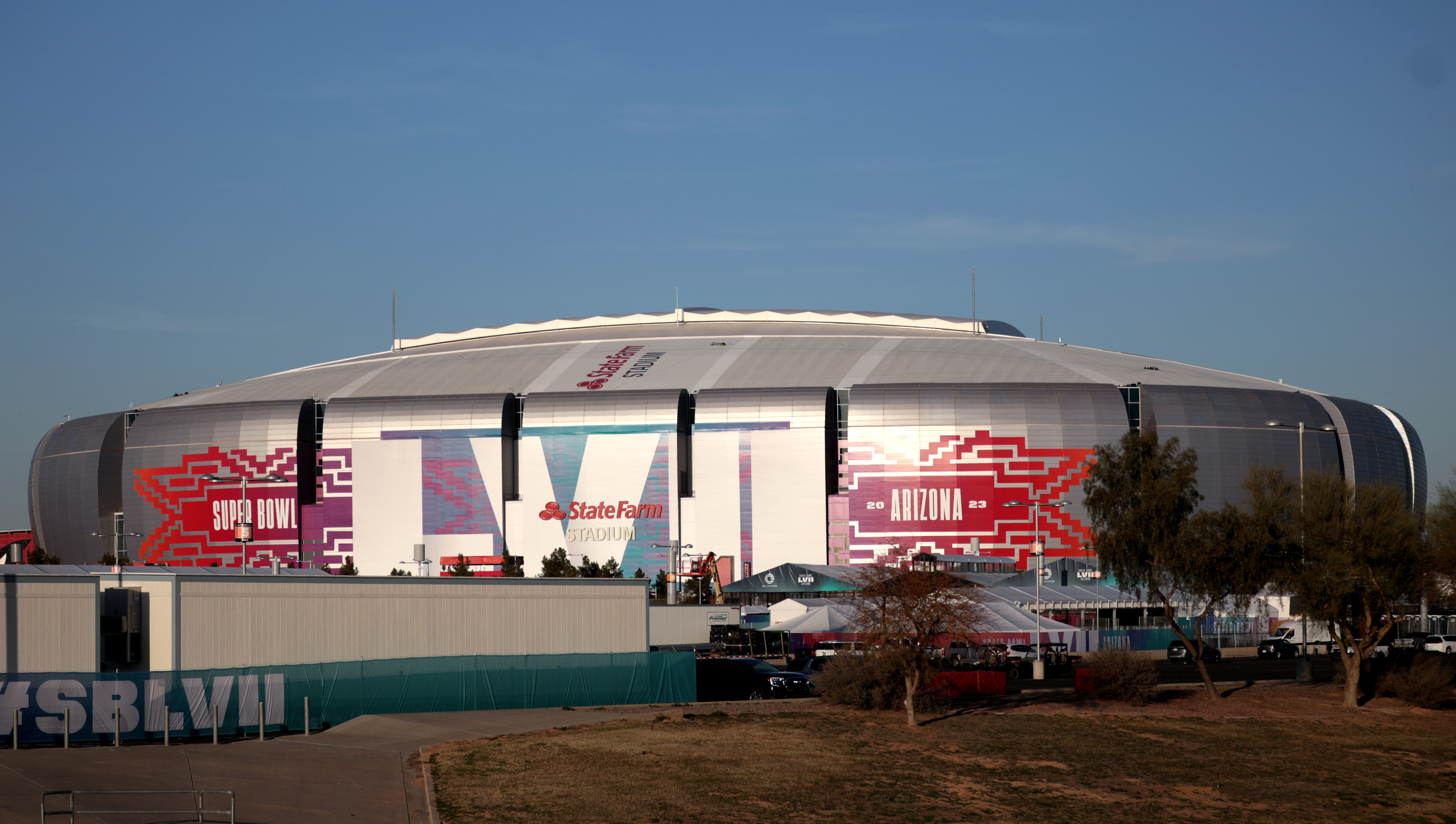
State Farm Stadium in Glendale

It is located west of the Phoenix city limits, within Maricopa County, Arizona.

The boundaries of the west valley is generally considered Interstate 17 in the east, Buckeye in west, the Sierra Estrella Mountains in the south, and Anthem in the north.

== Communities ==
=== Cities and towns ===
- Avondale
- Buckeye
- El Mirage
- Glendale
- Goodyear
- Litchfield Park
- Peoria
- Surprise
- Tolleson
- Youngtown
- Wickenburg

=== Unincorporated communities ===
- Morristown
- Sun City
- Sun City West
- Tonopah
- Waddell
- Wittman

Also generally considered part of the West Valley is the Phoenix neighborhood of Maryvale, which is bordered by Glendale to the north.
