= Verrado High School =

Public high school in Buckeye, Arizona

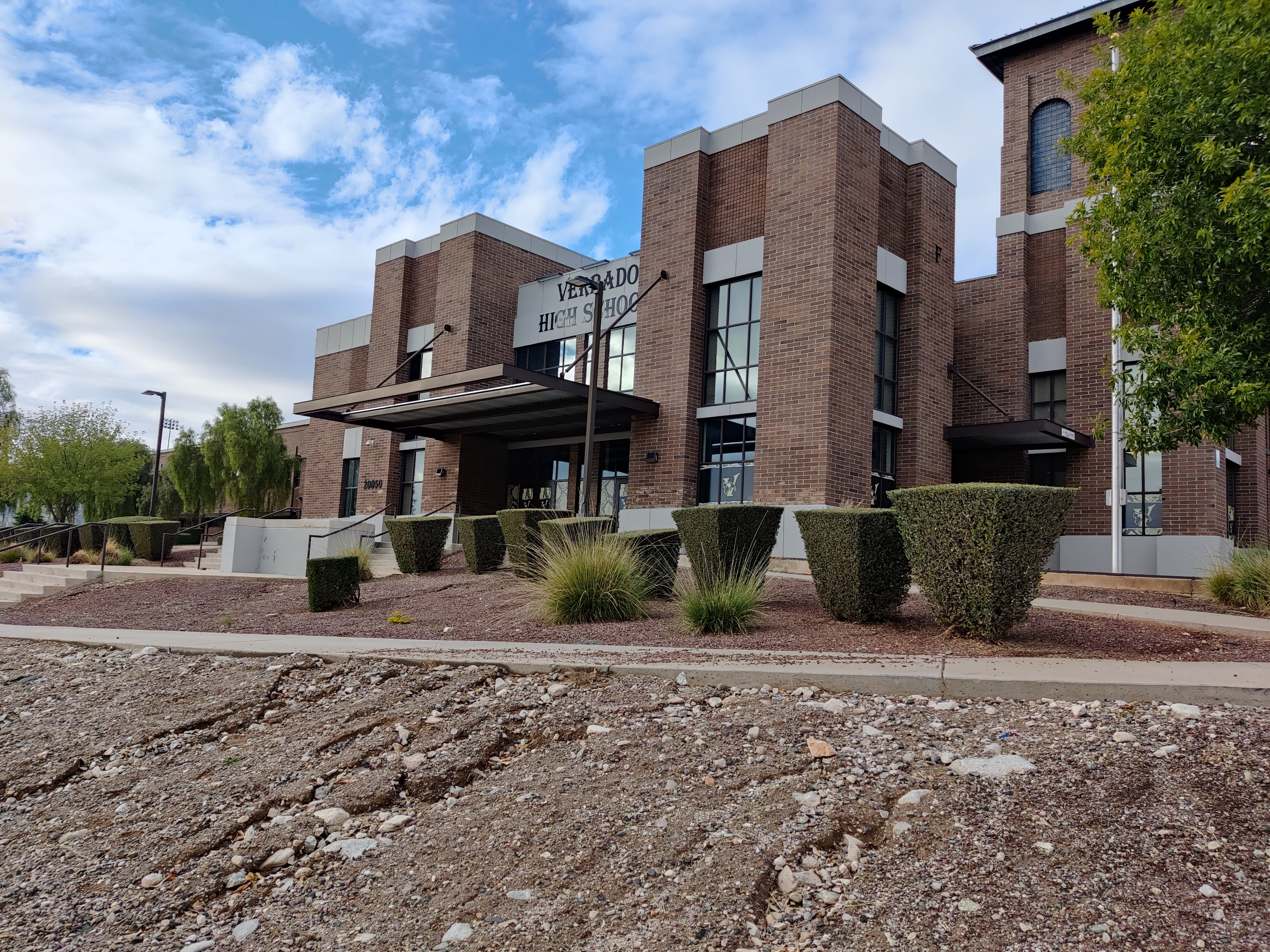
- Verrado High School, pictured in 2022

Location
- 20050 West Indian School Road; Buckeye, Arizona 85396; United States
- 33°29′40″N 112°29′29″W

Information
- School type: Public high school
- Motto: One Verrado
- Established: 2006; 20 years ago
- School district: Agua Fria Union High School District
- CEEB code: 030029
- NCES School ID: 040045002592
- Principal: Matt Lees
- Faculty: 89.30 (on FTE basis)
- Enrollment: 1,948 (2023-2024)
- Student to teacher ratio: 21.81
- Colors: Vegas gold and black
- Athletics conference: AIA
- Mascot: Viper
- Team name: Vipers
- USNWR ranking: 4,149
- Newspaper: The Viper Times
- Website: www.aguafria.org/vhs

Verrado High School is a public high school in the Verrado community of Buckeye, Arizona, United States. Operated by the Agua Fria Union High School District, the school primarily serves the Verrado area and is the fourth school in the district.

Construction on Verrado High School began in 2006. Designed by Orcutt/Winslow Partnership and developed by Adolfson and Peterson Construction, initial plans focused on an open design, particularly with regard to classrooms, and the school was built with technology in mind. The campus was designed as a green building, implementing measures in the design to reduce energy and water usage. Since 2006, various construction projects have been undertaken, including the development of a new field house in 2015. The school is two stories tall and 220,000 ft^{2} (20,000 m^{2}), costing $40,519,900 to build.

Verrado High School opened in 2006, with an inaugural class of 264. As of 2022, the school offers 17 Advanced Placement courses, 23 varsity sports, and various extracurricular activities to its 1,646 students. The school's demographics largely consist of Caucasian and Hispanic and Latino American students. Verrado is ranked 4,149th nationally by U.S. News and World Report, and 72nd in Arizona.

== History ==
=== Planning ===
The master-planned community of Verrado was initially built upon land owned by the construction company Caterpillar. In the mid-1990s, Caterpillar partnered with developer DMB Associates to develop a new town. Plans for a high school in the Verrado area were envisioned as early as 2002. Construction of the first homes was completed in 2004; DMB's plans for the community included a high school. DMB incorporated elements of New Urbanism, an urban design movement that arose in the early 1980s, into their plans, including the school. In October 2004, Orcutt/Winslow Partnership was selected to design the school's campus.

Construction on the school's campus began in 2005 and concluded in April 2006. Tom Huffman, a former assistant principal in the Paradise Valley Unified School District, was selected to serve as the school's first principal in July 2005. The authorization of a $35.6 million bond in November 2005 helped fund the construction of a football stadium, baseball and softball fields, tennis courts, and a gymnasium.

=== Opening and growth ===
Verrado High School opened in August 2005, to an inaugural class of 264. It is under the jurisdiction of the Agua Fria Union High School District (AFUHSD). In November 2006, the AFUHSD initiated a vote on a capital outlay budget override. The override would add $3.6 million over the course of seven years to buy new technology.

Since 2006, Verrado has invested in technology in classrooms. In comparison to retrofitting, the school's campus was built with considerations for wireless technology in mind, such as laptops and interactive whiteboards, a cost-effective implementation. Each classroom is equipped with a document camera and an LCD projector. In 2017, AFUHSD implemented one-to-one computing through Chromebooks at Verrado.

Verrado has hosted various events. In 2007, the school's football field was used for Buckeye's Fourth of July celebrations. Previously, Buckeye and Verrado had held separate celebrations, marking a turning point in the relationship between the two towns. Since 2014, Verrado has held an annual homecoming parade. Festivities are held near Verrado's Main Street and Village Green. These festivities precede a homecoming football game and the homecoming dance. In addition, the Summit Community Church has held congregations at Verrado, using the school's auditorium for service.

=== Further developments ===
The use of bond funds has helped fund additions and improvements to the campus. In 2012, heightened security was added to the school's campus, along with the addition of a weight room and new fencing, through the use of bond funds. Further security and safety measures were implemented using the use of bond funds in 2019.

In 2017, Huffman was replaced by Kristen Tiffany, who had previously served as an administrator for two schools in the AFUHSD. Two years later, Nathaniel Showman became Verrado's principal. Showman had previously worked at Verrado as a teacher and assistant principal, and had most recently served as the principal of Salina High School Central in Salina, Kansas.

During the COVID-19 pandemic, Verrado, along with the rest of the schools in the AFUHSD, switched to a distance learning model, following rising COVID-19 cases within the district.

In February 2023, weapons detectors were installed at Verrado, following an increase in firearm threats. Verrado is the first high school in Arizona to use weapons detectors, and the second to implement weapons detection measures, following the implementation of handheld metal detectors at Mountain Pointe High School in January. Weapons detectors will be implemented at other schools in the AFUHSD, including Canyon View High School. The weapons detectors, which cost an estimated $500,000 across all five schools, is part of a $2 million security initiative.

== Campus ==
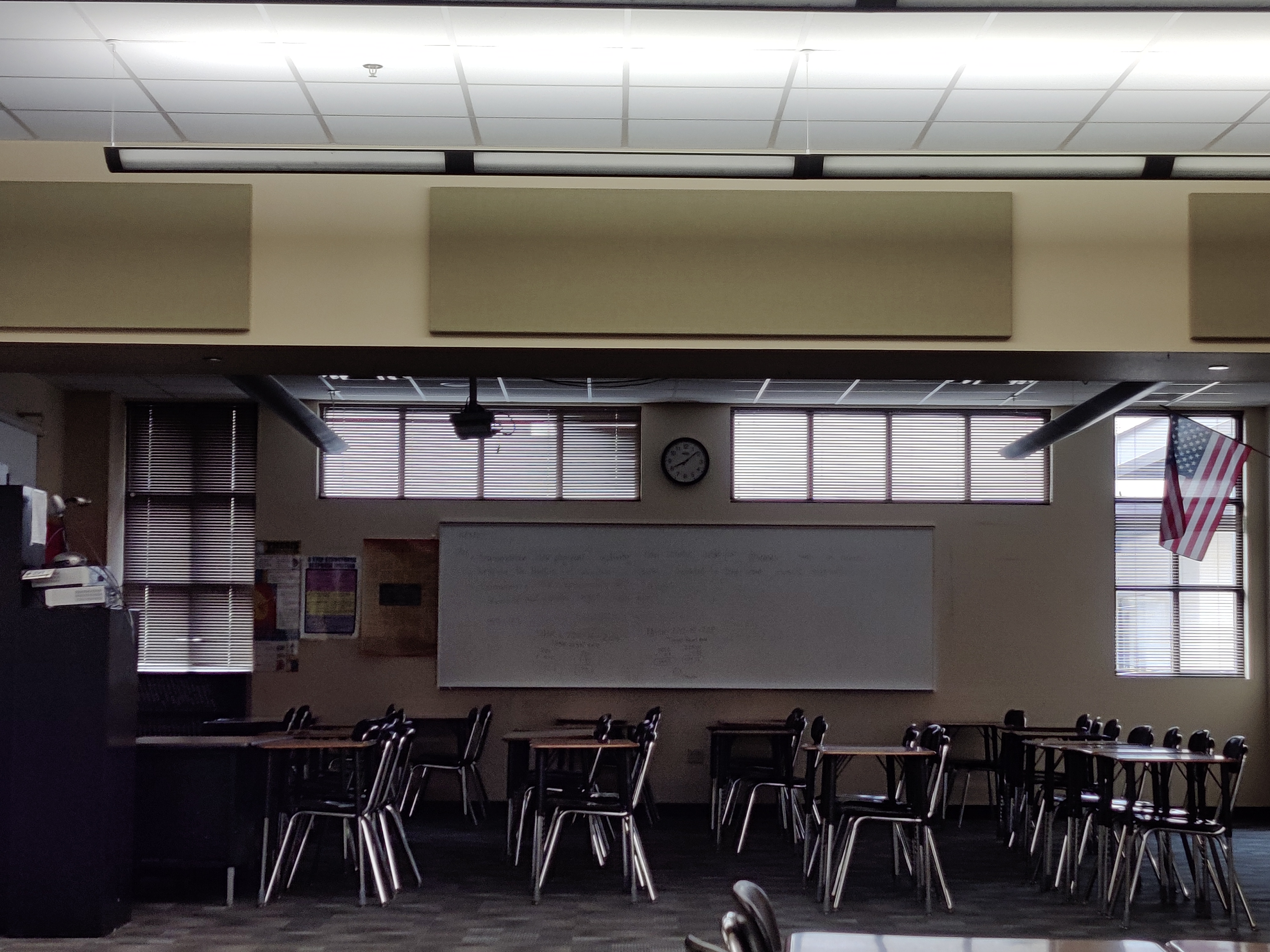
An open classroom at Verrado High School

Verrado High School was designed by architecture firm Orcutt/Winslow Partnership and constructed by Adolfson and Peterson Construction, who had previously worked with the AFUHSD on the second phase of Desert Edge High School in 2005. Other companies involved with the project included landscaping company Sloat Landscape, structural engineer KPFF Consulting Engineers, and energy consultant Quest Energy Group. Verrado developer DMB Associates donated land for the school and provided $2.25 million for construction. Initial plans for the building included a television studio, art room, choir room, and dance room.

The campus is two stories tall, covering a building area of 220,000 ft^{2} (20,000 m^{2}) and a site area of 53 acres. (Note: The site area is reported in the Education Design Showcase as 48 acres, while the Arizona Department of Environmental Quality reported 53 acres in its case study.) The building has a maximum capacity of 2,137 students and a design capacity of 1,600 students. In 2015, construction on a field house adjacent to the main campus began.

The form of the main campus imitates the New Urbanism ideas seen in Verrado. These ideas can be expressed through the metaphor of the building as a small government; the "wings" are treated as small neighborhoods of houses (classrooms), interwoven through a larger, federal government (school administration). Verrado also implements open classrooms through three-walled classrooms connected through a singular hallway, a learning space popularized in the late 1960s and 1970s. There are a total of five wings; four implement the aforementioned open classroom concept, while a fifth is used primarily for elective classes and features classrooms with a door and fourth wall.

Located in the center of the school is a 520-seat auditorium. Initial plans for the school failed to consider proper acoustics within the auditorium, causing reverberations in low frequencies and resulting in an unpleasant auditory experience. In addition, the plans placed the auditorium adjacent to the school's food court, consequently creating a noisy environment. To address these issues, ceiling tiles capable of reducing noise and acoustic panels were strategically placed to reduce reverberation.

Verrado was designed as a green building, and is the second high school in Arizona designated as such. Water efficient strategies implemented at Verrado include low-flow fixtures and showers with waterless urinals; these measures resulted in moderate water savings. Ventilation is handled through a central HVAC system, and optimizations to reduce energy include insulated glazing and daylighting. The building is Leadership in Energy and Environmental Design (LEED) certified. In 2010, solar panels were installed on the roof of the school's campus, as part of a clean energy initiative by the Agua Fria Union High School District, along with a 350 kW solar photovoltaic power system. Over 1,400 photovoltaic solar panels cover the rooftop of Verrado. Every classroom, with the exception of the computer lab, has sunlight. To increase sustainability, the school was constructed from locally quarried and produced brick, while desks and flooring were constructed from recyclable materials.

The total cost of construction was $40,519,900, including a building construction cost of $30,386,500 and a site development cost of $5,055,600.

== Academics ==
=== Enrollment ===
Student body composition as of 2021
| Race and ethnicity | Total |
|---|---|
| White | 46.1% |
| Hispanic | 41.6% |
| Black | 6.0% |
| Two or more Races | 3.0% |
| Asian | 2.3% |
| American Indian/Alaska Native | 0.5% |
| Native Hawaiian/Pacific Islander | 0.5% |
| Sex | Total |
| Male | 51% |
| Female | 49% |

As of the 2020-2021 school year, Verrado High School had an enrollment of 1,646 students and 87.40 classroom teachers (on FTE basis), for a student–teacher ratio of 18.83. As of 2019, 23% of students are on free or reduced lunch. The National Center for Education Statistics reported that in 2020 and 2021, the ethnic demographics of students was 46.1% Caucasian, 41.6% Hispanic and Latino American, 6% African American, 2.3% Asian American, and 4% other including American Indian, Alaska Native, Native Hawaiian, Pacific Islander American, and multiple raced backgrounds, making up a majority minority.

Enrollment has decreased since 2017, following an increase in enrollment since 2013; there were 2,024 students for the 2017-2018 school year, an increase from an enrollment of 1,646 as of the 2020-2021 school year. Demographically, Verrado has shifted, from 36.8% Hispanic and Latino American students in 2018 to 43.49% in 2022. Conversely, the percentage of Caucasian students has decreased, from 49.4% in 2018 to 45% in 2022.

=== Awards ===
In 2022, U.S. News & World Report ranked Verrado High School 4,149th nationally and 72nd among schools in Arizona. Newsweek placed the school 1,586th in its annual America's Best High Schools list for 2013. The Washington Post placed Verrado 1,747th on its "America's Most Challenging High Schools" list for 2015.

=== Curriculum ===
The curriculum at Verrado High School typically includes four years of English, mathematics, and three years of laboratory-based sciences and history, consistent with other high schools in the Agua Fria Union High School District. Students also take one year of a foreign language, two years of a fine arts class, and four years of an elective class. A wide range of elective courses are offered, and Verrado implements vocational education through courses in fields such as coding, digital photography, engineering, graphic design, marketing, and sports medicine.

Verrado offers a range of Advanced Placement (AP) classes, focusing on English, mathematics, science, history, art, and foreign languages. These classes allow students to earn college credit. The school also offers the AP Capstone diploma program. As of 2022, there are 17 AP classes offered, with about a third of students taking at least one AP class. About 45% of students pass their AP tests.

In 2009, Verrado partnered with Project Lead the Way to improve its STEM education, allowing students to earn college credit. Students may also earn college credit from the University of Arizona for enrolling in engineering courses. In 2016, Verrado began offering all-female engineering courses, in an effort to increase diversity.

Foreign language offerings at Verrado include Spanish, French, and Latin, of which Verrado is the only school in the district to offer a class in Latin. Students may also take AP Spanish Language and Culture. Science programs offered at the school include environmental science, biology, earth science, forensic science, chemistry, physics, and physical science.

Through Estrella Mountain Community College's dual enrollment program, certain classes at Verrado allow students to earn college credit concurrently as they take the course. Classes offering dual enrollment include Spanish II and Honors Spanish III, Honors Anatomy and Physiology, AP Biology, Sports Medicine I and II, Rehabilitation/Therapeutic Modalities, and Honors Pre-calculus. In addition, students can attend classes available through the Western Maricopa Education Center (West-MEC) joint technological education district during school hours. In 2018, a partnership was formed between Verrado and the ASU School of Sustainability; certain classes held at Verrado are led by instructors at Arizona State University (ASU), allowing students to earn college credits.

As part of the AFUHSD, sophomores, juniors, and seniors at Verrado can attend online classes through the school. These classes are taken outside of school hours, and a fee is required.

A ProPublica report in 2016 found that around a quarter of students take the SAT or ACT, and 4% are in a gifted and talented program. As of 2022, Verrado students had an average SAT composite score of 1170 out of 1600. The Arizona Board of Regents found that, for the 2015-2016 school year, 63.6% of students attended some form of post-secondary education.

== Extracurricular activities ==
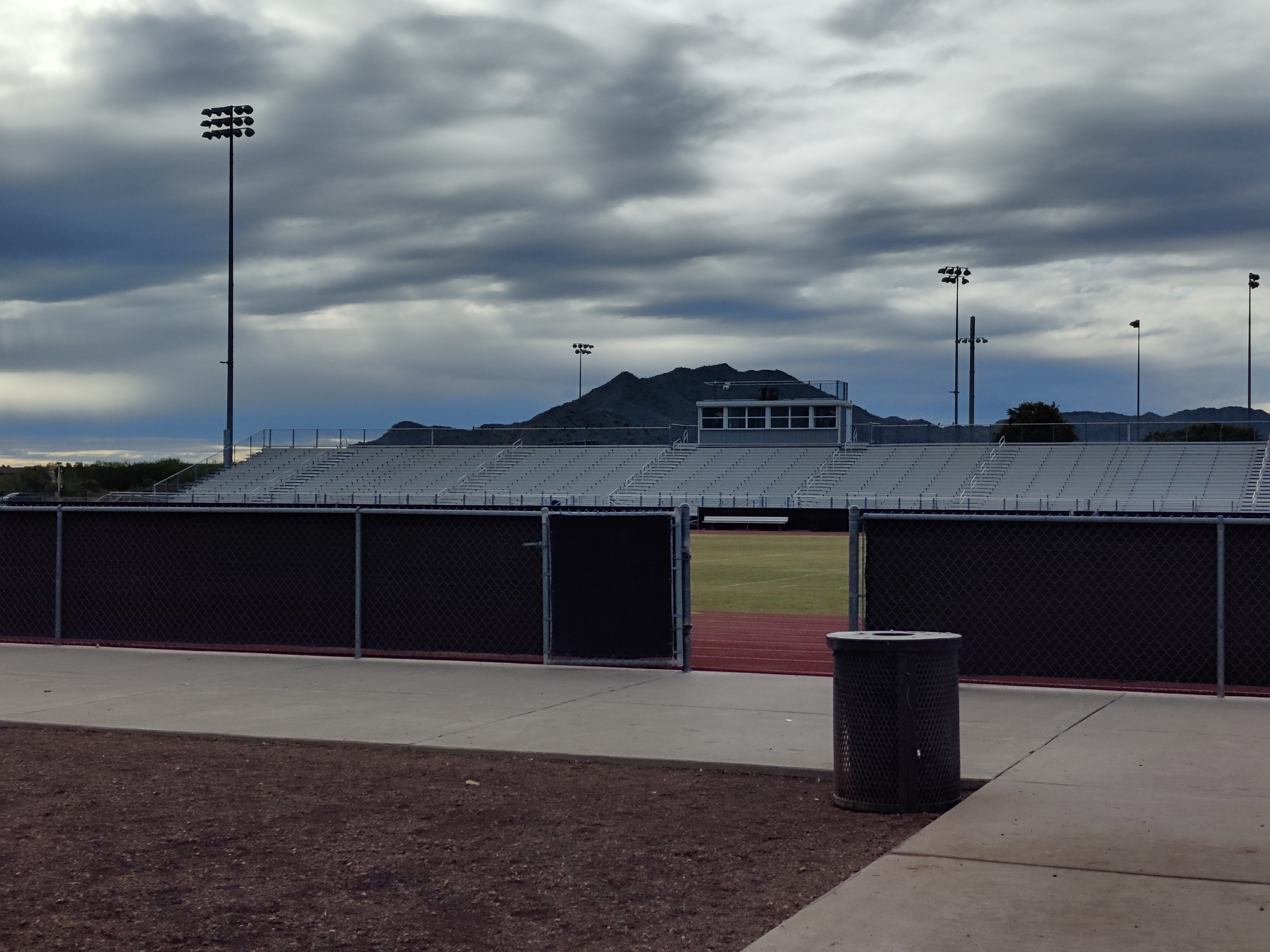
The football field at Verrado

Verrado High School fields 23 varsity teams, including badminton, track/cross country, football, golf, swimming, volleyball, basketball, soccer, wrestling, baseball/softball, and tennis; additionally, Verrado has an esports team. These teams compete under the Verrado Vipers moniker in the Arizona Interscholastic Association (AIA). In the AIA, the Verrado Vipers compete in the 5A conference and in Division II. In addition, the school also has a marching band and color guard, competing as the Viper Vanguard. The Viper Vanguard hold an annual invitational known as the Viper Thunder Classic.

The student body of Verrado is represented by a student government informally known as "StuGo", a portmanteau of "student" and "government". Verrado's student government helps organize spirit weeks and dances.

Verrado allows students to join clubs. As of 2022, the school had 36 clubs, including a National Honor Society chapter.

The Viper Times is the official school newspaper, published online by students who either take the journalism class or participate in the journalism club. As of 2022, 28 students are involved with the publication of the newspaper.

== See also ==
- Education in Arizona
