= Desert Edge High School =

Public high school in Goodyear, Arizona

Location
- 15778 West Yuma Road; Goodyear, Arizona 85338; United States; 33.4379°N 112.3985°W

Information
- School type: Public high school
- Established: 2002; 24 years ago
- School district: Agua Fria Union High School District
- CEEB code: 030194
- NCES School ID: 040045002273
- Principal: Gretchen Hann
- Staff: 88.40 (on FTE basis)
- Enrollment: 2,051 (2023-2024)
- Student to teacher ratio: 23.20
- Colors: Copper, White, and Black
- Athletics conference: AIA
- Mascot: Scorpion
- Team name: Scorpions
- USNWR ranking: 6,197
- Website: www.aguafria.org/dehs

Desert Edge High School is a public high school in Goodyear, Arizona, United States. Operated by the Agua Fria Union High School District, it is the third school in the district.

Construction on Desert Edge began in 2002. Designed by architect EMC2 Group, the school was constructed in two phases; the first was completed in 2002 by contractor Sun Eagle Construction, while the second was completed in 2005 by contractor Adolfson and Peterson Construction, who concurrently worked on Verrado High School. The campus was designed as a green building with design elements to reduce energy and water usage.

Desert Edge opened in 2002 to a class of 138 freshmen. As of 2022, the school offers 15 Advanced Placement courses. The school's demographics largely consist of Caucasian and Hispanic and Latino American students. Desert Edge is ranked 6,197th nationally by U.S. News and World Report and 112th in Arizona.

== History ==
=== Planning and opening ===
Desert Edge High School was completed in two phases. Architect EMC2 Group was contracted to construct Desert Edge High School prior to 2002, and contracted Sun Eagle Construction to complete the first phase.

Desert Edge opened in August 2002 to a class of 138 freshmen, accepting sophomores in 2003, juniors in 2004, and seniors in 2005. Leslie Anderson was selected as the school's first principal. By the time Desert Edge opened, Wigwam Creek Middle School in the Litchfield Elementary School District (LESD) had experienced multiple delays from its initial May 2002 completion date, forcing Desert Edge to accommodate 750 students in the LESD.

=== Funding and expansions ===
Since 2005, Desert Edge has used fundraisers to support its programs, such as its athletic program. In 2005, it held a golf fundraiser at the Tuscany Falls golf course in PebbleCreek. To incentivize lower-income students, Desert Edge started a rewards program in 2003; it then partnered with a local IHOP restaurant to offer gift cards.

In 2005, the AFUHSD proposed a 90,000 ft^{2} (8,400 m^{2}) expansion to Desert Edge's campus. The project was completed that same year by Adolfson and Peterson Construction, who were concurrently contracted to construct Verrado High School, totaling $12.7 million in costs, $9.1 million of which was paid for using funds from the Arizona School Facilities Board (SFB), while the remaining $3.6 million was paid for using standard District B bond funds. Construction was completed four weeks ahead of schedule and $450,000 under budget.

During the construction of Verrado High School, the AFUHSD considered rezoning the attendance zones, reducing Desert Edge's student population by 120 students and placing them at Verrado. The plan presented complications for students who required an alternate mode of transportation to attend Verrado, when they were able to walk to Desert Edge. The AFUHSD ultimately let these students stay at Desert Edge.

== Campus ==
Desert Edge High School was designed by architecture firm EMC2 Group and constructed in two phases; the first phase was constructed by Sun Eagle Construction, while Adolfson and Peterson Construction completed the second phase. The phases were completed in time for the 2002-2003 and 2005-2006 school years, respectively. The second phase included additions to the classroom wings and gymnasium, as well as a new maintenance building and auditorium. Additional companies involved in the project include engineering company LSW Engineers and clean energy consultant Green Ideas.

The campus covers 218,783 ft^{2} (20,325.6 m^{2}) and has a capacity of 1,600 students. The main campus consists of classrooms, administrative areas, a media center, a gymnasium, a 522-seat fine arts auditorium, a career technology area, and a student bookstore. Desert Edge uses informational interactive kiosks to provide information on, among other things, the water and electricity savings of the building, bus routes, and the weather. The campus is Leadership in Energy and Environmental Design (LEED) certified. Several expansions have been added to the campus since it opened in 2002, including a new field house in 2019.

Designed as an energy efficient building, Desert Edge implements multiple high-performance energy saving strategies, such as daylighting and demand controlled ventilation. Water efficient strategies implemented at Desert Edge include water-cooled chillers with a water-side economizer. Adjacent water-based cooling towers use a chiller bypass, taking advantage of Arizona's arid climate. These water efficient strategies ultimately resulted in a 38% reduction in water savings as compared to the requirements laid out in the Energy Policy Act of 1992. The energy efficiency of building materials was also considered; the school's masonry walls use R-19 cavity insulation, while its metal deck roof uses R-30 insulation. The school's windows are dual-paned with a U-factor of 0.33. The roofing system is Energy Star rated, and low-emitting adhesives, sealants, and paints were used. To reduce the amount of formaldehyde, agri-fiber board was used in regards to cabinetry. In 2010, solar panels were installed on the roof of the school's campus, as part of a clean energy initiative by the Agua Fria Union High School District. Adolfson and Peterson Construction sought to install solar panels during the construction of the second phase, but a lack of funding delayed the contractor's plans.

In addition, Desert Edge's campus engages in outdoor sustainable practices, such as drip irrigation and xeriscaping. Indoors, motion and daylight sensors are used that automatically turn off lights, depending on if people are present in the room and what the time of day is. These practices further increase the energy efficiency of Desert Edge, especially in comparison to other, more conventional schools. Additionally, carbon dioxide sensors signal a shut off signal to the fan coil when the rooms are unoccupied.

== Academics ==
=== Enrollment ===
Student body composition as of 2022
Race and ethnicity	Total
Hispanic	58.0%
White	21.7%
Black	12.4%
Two or more Races	3.7%
Asian	2.5%
American Indian/Alaska Native	0.8%
Native Hawaiian/Pacific Islander	0.8%
Sex	Total
Male	53%
Female	47%

As of the 2023–2024 school year, Desert Edge High School had an enrollment of 2,051 students and 88.40 classroom teachers (on FTE basis), for a student–teacher ratio of 23.20.

A majority minority is present in the student body at Desert Edge. The National Center for Education Statistics reported that in 2020 and 2021, the ethnic demographics of students was 22.2% Caucasian, 57.1% Hispanic and Latino American, 12.7% African American, 2.6% Asian American, and 5.2% other including American Indian, Alaska Native, Native Hawaiian, Pacific Islander American, and multiple raced backgrounds.

=== Awards ===
In 2022, U.S. News & World Report ranked Desert Edge High School 6,197th nationally and 112th among schools in Arizona. The Washington Post placed Desert Edge 1,796th on its "America's Most Challenging High Schools" list for 2015.

=== Curriculum ===
Consistent with curriculum at other high schools in the district, curriculum at Desert Edge High School typically includes four years of English, mathematics, and three years of laboratory-based sciences and history. Students also take one year of a foreign language, two years of a fine arts class, and four years of an elective class.

Desert Edge offers a range of Advanced Placement (AP) classes, focusing on English, mathematics, science, history, art, and foreign languages. These classes allow students to earn college credit. As of 2022, there are 17 AP classes offered, with about a third of students taking at least one AP class. About 45% of students pass their AP tests.

In 2006, Desert Edge began a cooperative relationship with Estrella Mountain Community College, allowing students to earn college credits in the Maricopa Community College District after school at Desert Edge. That same year, Desert Edge partnered with the Academy of Finance to offer classes in personal finance.

Since 2010, Desert Edge has offered a program for middle school students to enroll in high school classes through the adjacent Avondale Elementary School District. For at-risk students, Desert Edge offers three programs: an instructional program for students removed from a class for behavioral issues, a credit recovery program for students who fail their classes, and an alternative school for students who have difficulty learning in traditional classes.

As part of the AFUHSD, sophomores, juniors, and seniors at Desert Edge can attend online classes through the school. These classes are taken outside of school hours, and a fee is required.

A ProPublica report in 2016 found that around a fifth of students take the SAT or ACT, and 2% are in a gifted and talented program. As of 2022, Desert Edge students had an average SAT composite score of 1110 out of 1600. The Arizona Board of Regents found that, for the 2015-2016 school year, 53.3% of students attended some form of post-secondary education.

== Extracurricular activities ==
=== Athletics ===
Desert Edge High School fields 22 varsity teams, including badminton, track/cross country, football, golf, swimming, volleyball, basketball, soccer, wrestling, baseball/softball, and tennis; additionally, Desert Edge has an esports team. These teams compete under the Desert Edge Scorpions moniker in the Arizona Interscholastic Association (AIA). In the AIA, the Desert Edge Scorpions compete in the 5A conference and in Division II, as of 2023.

=== Music ===
The Desert Edge music program is represented by the Desert Edge Music Organization, which organizes an annual music festival known as "Edgestock". Desert Edge's choir program consists of five curricular choirs and two varsity groups, and boasts 180 students, as of 2022. To fund its band program, Desert Edge receives funding and instruments from the Giving Music the Edge program, a collaboration between local home builder Fulton Homes and alternative rock station KEDJ. The program raised $13,000 towards Desert Edge's band within its first year, followed by a $3,000 donation.

=== Other activities ===
Students at Desert Edge operate a television station under the callsign DETV. The station broadcasts morning announcements every school day and a weekly 10-minute show.

In March 2020, Raytheon Technologies donated $2,000 to Desert Edge to start a VEX Robotics team.

== Notable alumni ==
Notable alumni from Desert Edge include Mitchell Watt, basketball player for Reyer Venezia of the Lega Basket Serie A.

== See also ==
- Education in Arizona
