= Waddell, Arizona =

Unincorporated community in the state of Arizona, United States

- Unincorporated community
- Location in Maricopa County and the state of Arizona
- Coordinates: 33°36′41″N 112°25′38″W
- Country: United States
- State: Arizona
- County: Maricopa
- Elevation: 1,200 ft (370 m)
- Time zone: UTC-7 (Mountain (MST))
- ZIP code: 85355
- Area code: 623

Waddell is an unincorporated community in Maricopa County, Arizona, United States, northwest of Phoenix. Waddell is named after Donald Ware Waddell, a native of Ohio, who was a partner in the New York City investment firm Brandon, Gordon, and Waddell. This firm organized private financing for construction of the dam for the water reclamation project that created Lake Pleasant. The town site was laid out by Donald Waddell in 1935, on property he owned on the northeast corner of Waddell Road and Cotton Lane (Section 12, T3N, R2W, G&SRB&M). Waddell moved to the area to oversee the firm's interest in the project. He served on the board of the Maricopa Water District and invested in land through his Arizona Citrus Land Company and the Waddell Ranch Company.

In 1937, the Waddell Post Office was established inside a store on the original town site. Later, the post office moved across the street into shared space with the cotton gin office. A new Waddell post office was built in 1992 on Glendale Avenue and Cotton Lane, four miles south of the original site. The town never developed, but remained a post office and place name for the area.

The dam on the Agua Fria River that creates Lake Pleasant (once called Frog Tanks Dam, then Pleasant Dam) was renamed for Donald Waddell in 1963, shortly after his death, in recognition of his contributions to the Maricopa Water District. Barry M. Goldwater spoke at the dedication ceremony.

Glendale practiced strip annexation on roads around Waddell in the 1970s. With the expansion of the cities of Surprise and Glendale, the name Waddell is falling into disuse but is still seen on Waddell Road, an arterial street running through Surprise, as well as the New Waddell Dam at Lake Pleasant. In 2010, the White Tank Regional Library opened.

Waddell is the location of the Wat Promkunaram Buddhist Temple, where a mass shooting occurred in 1991 leaving nine monks or temple helpers dead. It remains the deadliest shooting in Arizona since statehood. Sixteen-year-old Alessandro Garcia and 17-year-old Jonathan Doody were charged with the crime, convicted, and sentenced. Doody was tried three times and sentenced to 281 years of prison in 2014.
