= Avondale Elementary School District =

School district in Arizona

The Avondale Elementary School District was established in 1894. Located west of Phoenix, Arizona, the district is home to nine schools ranging from kindergarten through eighth grade with several magnet programs.

List of schools in the district:

- Avondale Middle School
- Centerra Mirage STEM Academy
- Copper Trails School
- Desert Star School
- Desert Thunder School
- Eliseo C. Felix School
- Lattie Coor School
- Michael Anderson School
- Wildflower Accelerated Academy

Avondale School District 44 is a school district in Avondale, Arizona. Schools are located in the cities of Goodyear and Avondale.
