= Buckeye Union High School District =

School district in Maricopa County, Arizona

Address
- 1000 East Narramore Avenue Buckeye, Arizona, 85326; United States

District information
- Type: Public
- Grades: 9–12
- NCES District ID: 0401410

Students and staff
- Students: 4,785
- Teachers: 197.34
- Staff: 242.11
- Student–teacher ratio: 24.25

Other information
- Website: www.buhsd.org

The Buckeye Union High School District #201 (BUHSD) is a school district serving the town of Buckeye, Arizona, and the far southern section of the city of Goodyear, Arizona. Situated approximately 30 miles west of Phoenix, Arizona, the district serves approximately 3,710 students in three comprehensive high schools and one alternative school. The district was founded in 1913 as Buckeye School District #33 and was later renamed to its current Buckeye Union High School District in 1930.

It operates Buckeye Union, Estrella Foothills, and Youngker high schools, as well as the Learning Center, an alternative school. Mr. Rob Roberson was named the Interim Superintendent in July 2020 after the retirement of Mr. Eric Godfrey.

== History ==
As early as 1913, Professor L.O. DuRoss, principal of Buckeye Grammar School, published in the local newspaper, the Buckeye Valley News, the need for all nearby school districts to combine resources to form one substantial high school that benefited residents of each district. The Buckeye School District gradually worked toward this goal by adding 10th and 11th grades in 1914 and 12th grade in 1920. By 1921, the Buckeye School qualified enough of its educational program to grant diplomas to two senior students. Then, beginning in 1922, a class graduated each year from the facilities shared with Buckeye Elementary School. Prior to 1922, high school seniors had to complete their last year at Phoenix Union High School or at another accredited institution.

In February 1928 the Buckeye Board of Trustees approved a bond election for a new high school to be built at another site in Buckeye. Land was donated by local residents and, in September 1929, the doors of the new high school building built by Buckeye School District #33 opened at 902 Eason Avenue with approximately 60 students enrolled. At the same time a movement within the community advocated for the creation of a union high school, and a proposition was presented to voters living in the local school districts to establish a new and separate union high school district. The proposition reportedly had widespread support in all districts except one and the measure passed with little opposition.

The new Buckeye Union High School Board was certified in a joint board meeting on June 24, 1929. The new board held an election, was organized and soon earned its accreditation from North Central Association of Secondary Schools. In the first year of the newly christened Buckeye Union High School, about 100 students worked under five teachers. Subjects taught were restricted to three years of English (taught every other year) with the teaching of English IV as an alternative, two years of math, language and history, and one year each of typing, shorthand, bookkeeping, government, and biology. No vocational work was offered.

Many school traditions began in 1925 with the inclusion of most interscholastic sports teams, although the first football team was organized in 1923. At the time, the athletic teams were known as the "Wildcats”, but in 1929, the BUHS mascot became the "Hawks", narrowly defeating the "Farmers" in a school-wide vote. Also in 1925, the first yearbook was published and called El Ocotillo, followed by the Buckeye in 1929. It was not until 1935 the student body changed the name to the Falcon to distinguish it from the school newspaper, the Hawk. In 1924, the school song "Hurrah for the Blue and Gold" was written. The BUHS fight song, "BUHS, Hats Off To You" became the more popular school song in the mid-1960s.

Additional facilities soon became necessary as the student population expanded from 60 students in 1929 to 229 in 1941. . The auditorium, the east and west wings, and the gymnasium were added to the original Eason Avenue facility during the summer and fall of 1929. During the Depression years, with the assistance of the Works Progress Administration, a shop and garage were built, plus additional auditorium dressing rooms, tennis courts, and a football field with lights and bleachers.

Throughout the 1950s growth and a need to update aging facilities spawned a period of growth to the school's physical campus. In 1950, with enrollment growing to 280 students, the district completed the “B” wing of the school, and a new football field was built in its present location, just north of the school. The middle of the decade witnessed the old gymnasium torn down and a new one built while the front part of the shop area was rebuilt in 1959. The baseball field in Buckeye Park was also finished in 1959 and was later named Ellis Field on April 23, 1960, in honor of Principal Alvin E. Ellis who had died the previous school year.

Beginning in 1960, with an approximate enrollment of 550, Chester D. McNabb was hired as BUHSD's first superintendent. During his twenty-year tenure, the district saw unprecedented growth both in enrollment and the physical campus. The “C”, “D”, and “E” wings were added to accommodate the student body, as it increased to 832 students by 1975. A library was completed in 1975 and quickly became the hub of the educational system on campus. There were also multiple additions to the football stadium, and the campus was landscaped with numerous palm and mulberry trees. The size of the faculty nearly doubled by 1975, and new programs in vocational education began. With the passing of the Title IX of the Educational Amendments of 1972 by the United States Congress, the girls’ athletic program began to evolve beyond a simple tennis program into a full interscholastic athletic department.

While the district's enrollment stabilized and averaged just over 800 students throughout the 1980s and the first half of the 1990s, the community showed their support for the school passing bonds in 1980 and 1990. The funds raised through the issuance of the bonds allowed BUHSD to expand and update its facilities, including the construction of a campus fully networked by computers to meet the current and future education needs of its students. As a result of these measures, when the BUHS's enrollment boomed from 830 students in 1993 to 947 students in 1995, the district was prepared to handle the quick influx of new students. BUHS saw its enrollment cross the millennium mark with 1,029 students, and it has remained above that mark ever since. Eventually, enrollment plateaued at 1,646 students during the 2007–08 and 2008-09 school years.

Because of consistently high growth within the district's boundaries, a new school had to be built to alleviate the pressure on the district's lone high school, Buckeye Union. Groundbreaking for Estrella Foothills High School (EFHS) was held Sept. 20, 2000, and opening ceremonies and classes began on August 31, 2002. Foothills, as it is commonly called, opened with approximately 150 freshmen, a new mascot the “Wolf”, and is located at 13033 S. Estrella Parkway in Goodyear, Arizona.

The district's third school became official in the fall of 2003, with the establishment of the Buckeye Academy. This alternative school is designed for students who have had difficulty succeeding in a traditional high school setting. Approximately 30 students were enrolled at the campus located in the old Masonic Lodge building on 4th Street and Narramore in Buckeye. The school's lead teacher was Johnny Ray. In 2011, a new facility was built at 751 N. 215th Avenue in Buckeye. The new facility, now named the BUHSD Learning Center, focuses on a dual role of accommodating special needs students living within BUHSD's boundaries and neighboring communities and computer based instruction for students seeking an alternative learning environment.

During the 2001–02 school year, plans were made through Student First Legislature Plan to renovate the school, whose main building was built in 1929. Construction for the new facilities began on January 24, 2003, with the footprint of the new BUHS campus located just east of the football stadium. Plans also called for the original building on Eason Avenue to become District offices. On December 19, 2003, movers came to the old campus and on January 5, 2004, students began the New Year on the new campus. The demolition of the old B-C-D-E wings and of the Maintenance, Industrial Arts and Agriculture areas began as construction continued and the new campus began to take shape over the next two years with a new gymnasium, tennis courts, and parking lots. BUHS finished the renovation of its current campus by adding a new Performing Arts Center and refurbished Ellis Baseball Field in 2008.

The district continued to grow with the ground breaking of Youngker High School on April 17, 2006, located at 3000 S. Apache Road in Buckeye. Youngker officially opened in August, 2007 with approximately 300 students, and a new mascot, the "Rough Riders". Johnny Ray, formerly the lead teacher at Buckeye Academy, was called on to be YHS's first principal. Because of Youngker's close proximity to BUHS, Buckeye Union's student enrollment decreased to 1,499 in 2009 and has since fallen to 1,136 for the 2011–12 school year.

The historic A Wing of the original Buckeye Union High School, now owned by the Town of Buckeye, received national historic designation on December 30, 2009. As a result, the official street address for BUHS and the district's offices changed to 1000 E. Narramore instead of 902 E Eason Ave. In 2011, BUHSD celebrated the 90th anniversary of its first graduating class from Buckeye High School (now Buckeye Union High School) in 1921.

== Schools ==
- Buckeye Union High School
- Estrella Foothills High School
- Youngker High School

== Alternative school ==
- The Learning Center

== Feeder elementary school districts ==
- Buckeye
- Liberty
- Palo Verde
