= Rainbow Valley, Arizona =

Neighborhood in Maricopa County, Arizona

Coordinates: 33°13′55″N 112°23′14″W

Rainbow Valley is a rural neighborhood south of the Gila River, United States. It is unincorporated, meaning it is not within the city of Buckeye but instead Maricopa County. It is a very spread out neighborhood with approximately 34 people per square mile. To the east of Rainbow Valley is a community called Estrella Mountain Ranch. The neighborhood has one store, a Dollar General, but any other stores in the area are located in the Estrella Mountain or Buckeye area. Rainbow Valley has many mountains and hills.

== Residents ==
The older homes of Rainbow Valley were built between 1970 and 1999. In 2000, there was a great influx of people who moved into Rainbow Valley. About 49 percent of the people living there moved to Rainbow Valley after 2000. Most of the homes are mobile homes, except the older homes. There are only two subdivisions, one called Grand View Ranches and Grand View Ranches II. The rest of Rainbow Valley mainly consists of multi-acre lots.

There are several dairies located in Rainbow Valley and many of the residents have horses, goats and chickens.

== Schools ==
There is only one elementary school in Rainbow Valley, Rainbow Valley Elementary School. It is part of the Liberty Elementary School District. The school is for kindergarten up to eighth grade. Upon graduating, the eighth graders either go to Estrella Foothills High School or Buckeye High School.
