= Verrado =

Suburban community in Buckeye, Arizona

Coordinates: 33.4867°N 112.5104°W

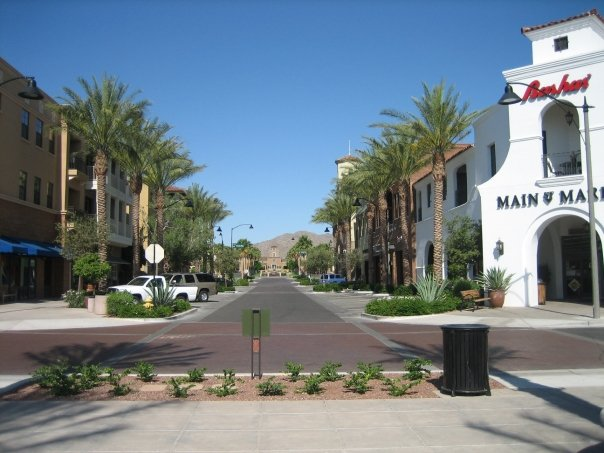
View of Main Street

Verrado (derived from the Spanish word "verdad," which can be translated to "truth" and "authenticity"), is a master-planned community located in the city of Buckeye, Arizona, approximately 25 miles (40 km) west of downtown Phoenix. The development, at the base of the White Tank Mountains, is the largest suburban community in Metropolitan Phoenix in which the concept of New Urbanism was utilized. It is planned to contain over 14,000 dwelling units at full build out. Verrado is a DMB Associates, Inc. development.

== Marketside District ==
Marketside District is the gateway to Verrado from Interstate 10, featuring traditional single-family homes on a slightly more modern street plan than the rest of Verrado, in addition to Marketside Villas, a built-to-rent community of single-family homes. Recreation options include: Marketside Park, a four-block-long central greenbelt with party and playground facilities; Barketside Dog Park, a pair of semi-shaded dog parks with running water and plenty of space for both large and small dogs; Eden Park, an interactive playground for 2-5 year olds; and Coronado Commons Splash Pad.

As of September 2025, businesses in Marketside District include:

FasMarket (Shell Station, convenience store, car wash)
Culver’s
Taco Bell
Wing Stop
Starbucks
Cold Beers & Cheeseburgers
Dutch Bros Coffee
Jersey Mike’s Subs
V’s Barbershop
Athletico Physical Therapy
AT&T
Cute-Icle Nails & Spa
Verizon Wireless
On Cloud 9 Massage
French Radiance Esthetics
Palm Valley Pediatric Dentistry & Orthodontics
La Vie Aesthetics
Teased Hair
Marketside Animal Hospital
Epiphany Dermatology
West Valley Pediatrics
Barro’s Pizza
Fairfield Inn
TownePlace Suites
Banner Health Center
Royal Nail Lounge
Café Zupas

=== Verrado Marketplace ===
In the Spring of 2026, Vestar’s Verrado Marketplace, a 500,000 square foot, high-end mixed-use outdoor mall, will open in Verrado’s Marketside District at the intersection of Verrado Way and Interstate 10.

== Main Street District ==
The development features an "old-town America" inspired Main Street at the core of the community with shopping, restaurants, residential services, and multi-family homes.

As of September 2025, the business present in the Main Street District include the following:

Barbershop on Main
Bashas' on Main Street
Blue Daisy Day Spa and Salon
Ciao Grazie Pizzeria & Wine Bar
CVS Pharmacy
Cohere
Anthem Coffee Co.
Edward Jones
Empower Physical Therapy
Ganyo Insurance Agency
Gill Law Firm
Johnson Wealth Management
Justin Thrasher Agency (American Family Insurance)
Main Street Aesthetics
Main Street Dental
Majestic Beauty Spa, PLLC
Nemechek Autonomic Medicine
Orange Leaf Frozen Yogurt
Pioneer Title
Sol Power Solutions
Tempo Urban Bistro
Verrado Assembly/Verrado Community Association
Verrado Realty
Vision Wellness
V-Town Designs
906 Wellness
Rosie’s Taco Shop
Main Street Medical
Verrado Golf Club
Verrado Grille
BoSa Donuts
Bobazona
DeGino Coffee Bar
Haymaker
Manna Movement Pilates
Pretty Q Nails
Signature Barbershop
Studio Linea
Thrive Swim & Ride
Torch & Kiln
West Rose Tasting Room

== Neighborhoods ==
Verrado's townhouses and single-family residences radiate from the Main Street District. The design of these neighborhoods was based on that of American neighborhoods of the early twentieth century, including those of nearby Phoenix's historic districts. Some homes feature garages that are accessed from a rear alley rather than from the street to provide for a more traditional street-scape. Neighborhood amenities include a community center, a swim park, a golf course, 78 community parks, a dog park, and 21 miles of paths and hiking trails.

=== Victory at Verrado ===
Victory is an age-restricted district (55 years of age and older) within the all-ages community of Verrado. The Victory District is in the northern section of Verrado and is located in the foothills of the White Tank Mountain range. It will include 3,000 homes at full build-out.

== Education ==
Verrado is situated within 3 school districts: Litchfield Elementary School District #79, Agua Fria Union High School District #216 and Saddle Mountain Unified School District #90. The community currently contains three schools, in addition to the Goddard School for Early Childhood Development (ages 6 months-6 years).

- The Goddard School (Pre-school)
- Verrado Elementary School (Pre-school and grades K–5)
- Verrado Middle School (Grades 6–8)
- Heritage K-8 (Grades K–8)
- Verrado High School (Grades 9–12)
