= Buckeye, Arizona =

City in Maricopa County, Arizona, United States

- City
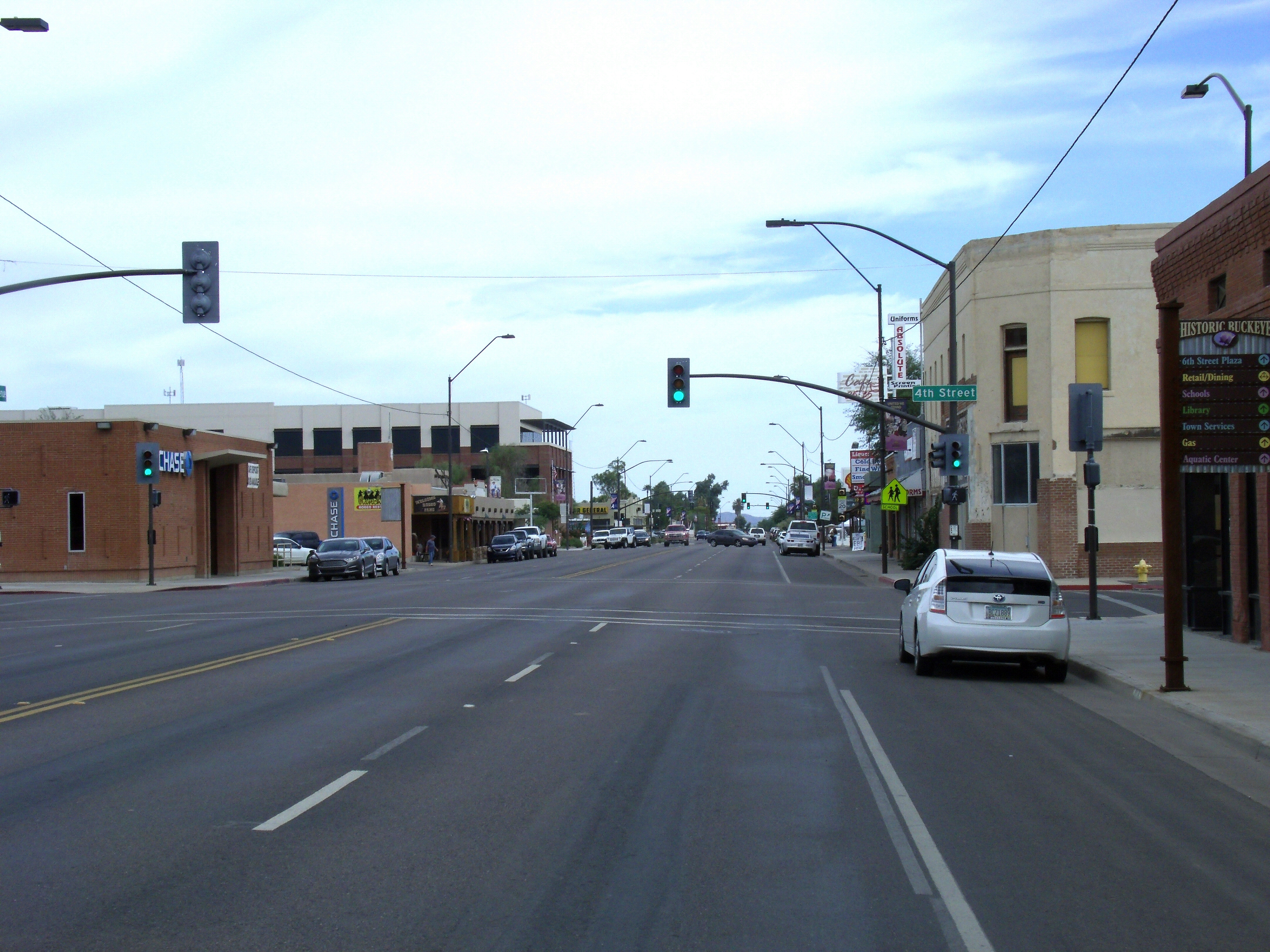
- Historic downtown Buckeye as seen from Monroe Avenue in October 2015

- Flag

- Location in Maricopa County, Arizona

- Location within Arizona Location within the United States
- Coordinates: 33°22′14″N 112°35′27″W
- Country: United States
- State: Arizona
- County: Maricopa
- Established: 1888

Government
  - Type: Council-Manager
  - Mayor: Eric Orsborn
  - Vice Mayor: Craig Heustis
  - City Council: Tony Youngker; Jamaine Berry; Curtis Beard; Patrick HagEstad; Craig Heustis; Clay Goodman
  - City Manager: Doug Sandstrom
  - City Clerk: Lucinda J. Aja

Area
  - Total: 393.16 sq mi (1,018.29 km^{2})
  - Land: 392.99 sq mi (1,017.83 km^{2})
  - Water: 0.17 sq mi (0.45 km^{2})
- Elevation: 1,076 ft (328 m)

Population (2020)
  - Total: 91,502
  - Density: 233/sq mi (89.9/km^{2})
- Time zone: UTC−7 (MST (no DST))
- ZIP codes: 85326, 85396
- Area codes: 623, 602, 480, 928
- FIPS code: 04-07940
- GNIS feature ID: 2411736
- Website: www.buckeyeaz.gov

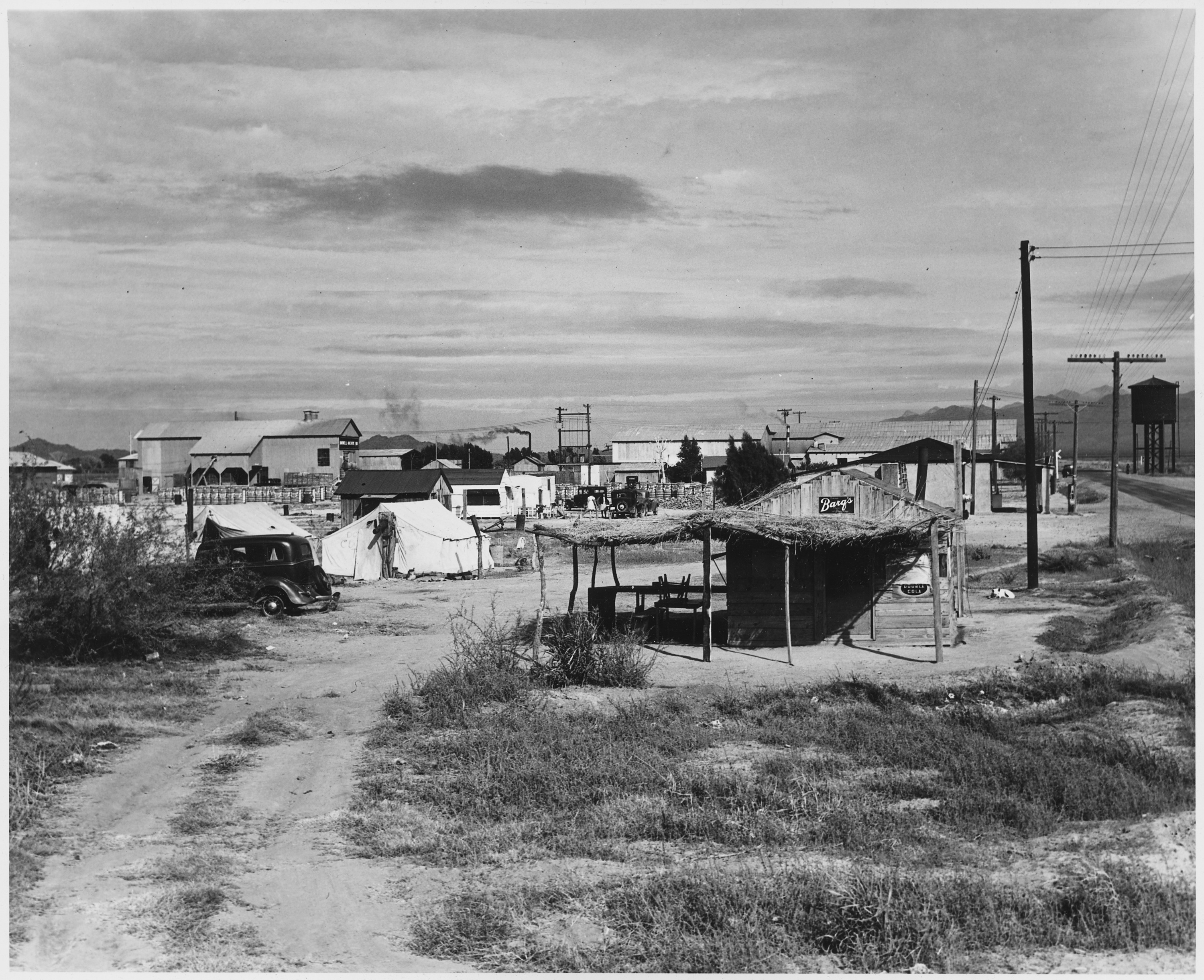
Private auto camp for cotton pickers in Buckeye, 1940

Buckeye /ˈbʌkaɪ/ is a city in Maricopa County, Arizona, United States. It is Arizona's second-largest city by area, and it is the westernmost suburb in the Phoenix Metropolitan Area. As of the 2020 census, the population was 91,502, up from 50,876 in 2010, and 6,537 in 2000. It was the fastest-growing city in the United States for 2017, 2018, and 2021.

== History ==
The Buckeye area was first inhabited by the Hohokam culture. In 1877, Thomas Newt Clanton led a group of six men, three women, and ten children from Creston, Iowa, to Arizona, where they settled in the Buckeye area.

Early settler Malie M. Jackson developed 10 miles (16 km) of the Buckeye Canal from 1884 to 1886, which he named after his home state of Ohio's moniker, "The Buckeye State". The town was founded in 1888 and originally named "Sidney", after Jackson's hometown in Ohio. However, because of the significance of the canal, the town became known as Buckeye. The name was legally changed to Buckeye in 1910. The town was incorporated in 1929, at which time it included 440 acres (180 ha). The town's first mayor was Hugh M. Watson (1956–1958), who founded the Buckeye Valley Bank. Today, Watson Road is the site of the city's commercial center.

In 2008, Buckeye was featured on The NewsHour with Jim Lehrer as part of a week-long series entitled "Blueprint America".

A vote to designate the town as the City of Buckeye became effective in 2014.

In May 2019, population estimates released by the U.S. Census Bureau placed Buckeye as the fastest growing city in the United States by percentage from 2017–2018, growing by 8.5%.

== Geography ==
Buckeye is located approximately 30 miles (48 km) west of downtown Phoenix in the Buckeye Valley. Interstate 10 passes through the central part of the city, north of the original town center. U.S. Route 80 once passed through the city, while Arizona State Route 85 skirts what was the city's west edge. The city limits now extend 30 miles (48 km) to the north and 16 miles (26 km) to the south of the original town center.

According to the United States Census Bureau, the city has a total area of 393.2 square miles (1,018.4 km^{2}), of which 0.2 square miles (0.52 km^{2}), or 0.04%, were listed as water. The Gila River flows westward through the Buckeye Valley south of the center of the city. The Buckeye Hills and Little Rainbow Valley are to the south, beyond which the city limits extend as far as Margies Peak. To the north the city limits include the southern part of the White Tank Mountains and continue north nearly as far as City of Surprise. The Hassayampa River, a tributary of the Gila, flows southward through the northern part of the Buckeye city limits.

Soils in Buckeye are alkaline and mostly well drained loam or clay loam except in northern neighborhoods such as Verrado, where gravelly sand or sandy loam with varying degrees of excessive drainage are common.

=== Neighborhoods ===
The original Buckeye was built around downtown's main street, Monroe Avenue. There are currently nearly 30 master planned communities planned for Buckeye. Those communities under development in which homes are occupied include Riata West, Sundance, Verrado, Sienna Hills, Westpark, Tartesso and Festival Ranch.

Other unbuilt planned communities within Buckeye include Teravalis (planned for nearly 300,000 inhabitants), Sun Valley Villages, Spurlock Ranch, Trillium, Elianto, Westwind, Silver Rock, Henry Park, Southwest Ranch and Montierre.

Sundance Towne Center, a shopping center developed by Vestar Development in the Sundance community, opened in 2007.

=== Climate ===
Buckeye has a hot desert climate (Köppen BWh), with abundant sunshine due to the stable descending air of the eastern side of the subtropical anticyclone aloft and at sea level over the southwestern United States. Summers, as with most of the Sonoran Desert, are extremely hot, with 121.0 afternoons reaching 100 °F or 37.8 °C and 181.6 afternoons reaching 90 °F or 32.2 °C. The record high temperature of 128 °F (53.3 °C) occurred on July 28, 1995, and temperatures above 86 °F or 30 °C may occur in any month. Cooler weather may occasionally occur during summer, but such periods are no less unpleasant as they result from monsoonal weather, with its attendant higher cloudiness and humidity; however, actual rainfall from the monsoon is much more infrequent than in Flagstaff, Nogales or even Tucson. The heaviest daily rainfall has been 4.90 inches (124.5 mm) on September 2, 1894, but between 1971 and 2000 no month had more rainfall than 4.52 inches or 114.8 millimetres in December 1984.

The winter season from November to March is warm to very warm during the day, not much cooler than 68 °F or 20 °C during a typical afternoon, but 20.2 mornings typically fall to or below 32 °F or 0 °C, though no snowfall was recorded during the 1971 to 2000 period, and only twelve afternoons did not reach 50 °F or 10 °C. The coldest temperature recorded in Buckeye was 11 °F or −11.7 °C on January 8, 1913.

Climate data for Buckeye, Arizona (1971–2000); extremes 1893–2001
Month	Jan	Feb	Mar	Apr	May	Jun	Jul	Aug	Sep	Oct	Nov	Dec	Year
Record high °F (°C)	100 (38)	92 (33)	101 (38)	106 (41)	115 (46)	122 (50)	125 (52)	120 (49)	119 (48)	108 (42)	96 (36)	87 (31)	125 (52)
Mean daily maximum °F (°C)	68.3 (20.2)	73.2 (22.9)	78.7 (25.9)	87.3 (30.7)	95.9 (35.5)	105.8 (41.0)	108.4 (42.4)	106.3 (41.3)	101.0 (38.3)	90.0 (32.2)	76.8 (24.9)	68.2 (20.1)	88.3 (31.3)
Mean daily minimum °F (°C)	36.7 (2.6)	40.4 (4.7)	44.6 (7.0)	49.6 (9.8)	57.5 (14.2)	65.3 (18.5)	74.2 (23.4)	73.6 (23.1)	66.1 (18.9)	53.1 (11.7)	41.3 (5.2)	35.8 (2.1)	53.2 (11.8)
Record low °F (°C)	11 (−12)	18 (−8)	20 (−7)	29 (−2)	32 (0)	42 (6)	49 (9)	48 (9)	41 (5)	26 (−3)	20 (−7)	12 (−11)	11 (−12)
Average rainfall inches (mm)	0.80 (20)	0.80 (20)	0.99 (25)	0.26 (6.6)	0.15 (3.8)	0.07 (1.8)	0.67 (17)	1.22 (31)	0.75 (19)	0.64 (16)	0.64 (16)	0.92 (23)	7.91 (199.2)
Average rainy days (≥ 0.01 inch)	3.4	3.1	4.0	1.5	0.8	0.4	2.0	4.1	2.4	2.3	1.9	3.1	29
Source: National Oceanic and Atmospheric Administration

== Demographics ==
Historical population
Census	Pop.	Note	%±
1910	684		—
1920	726		6.1%
1930	1,077		48.3%
1940	1,305		21.2%
1950	1,932		48.0%
1960	2,286		18.3%
1970	2,599		13.7%
1980	3,434		32.1%
1990	5,038		46.7%
2000	6,537		29.8%
2010	50,876		678.3%
2020	91,502		79.9%
2024 (est.)	114,334	▲	25.0%
U.S. Decennial Census

=== Racial and ethnic composition ===
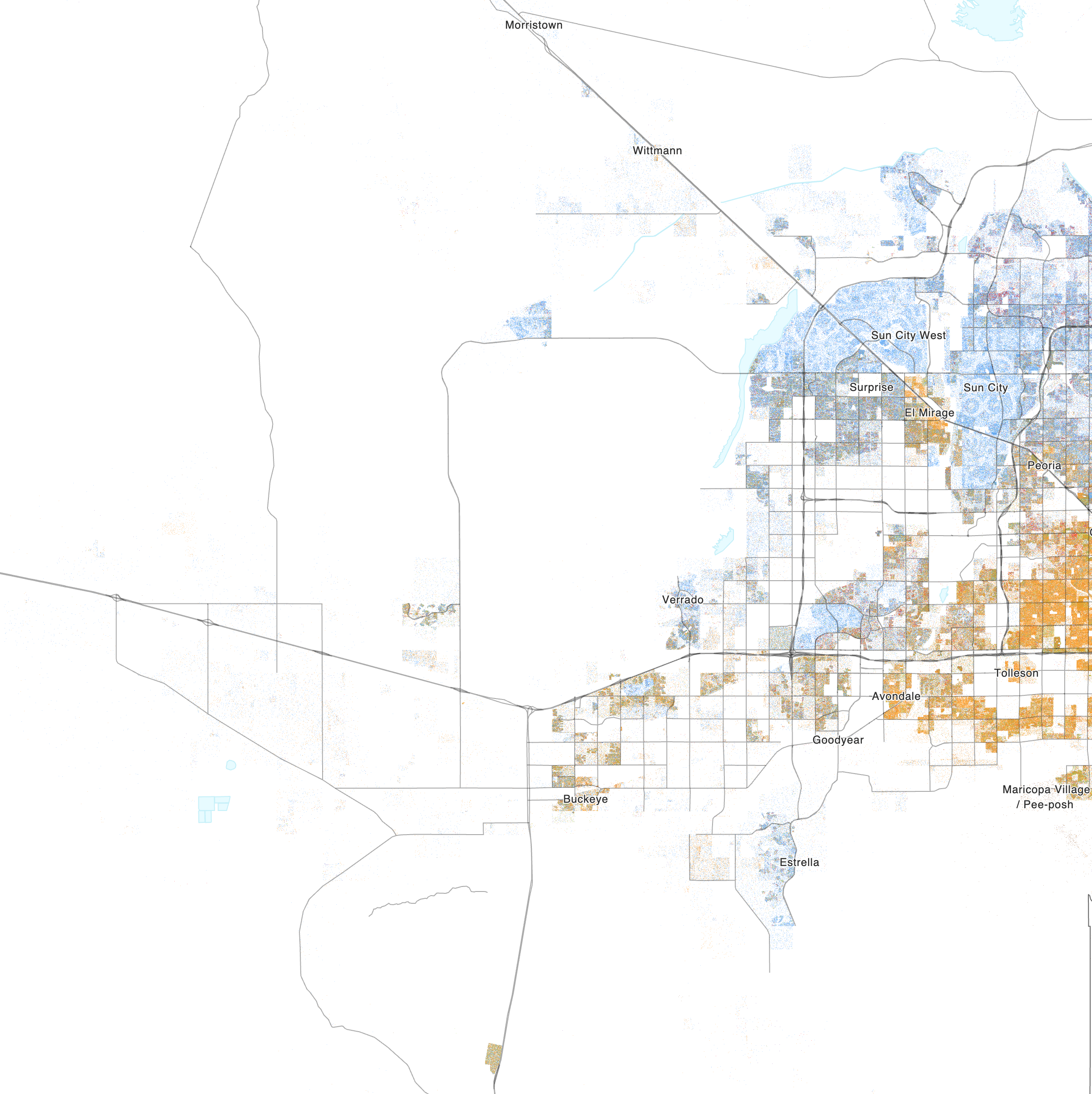
Map of racial distribution in Buckeye, 2020 U.S. census. Each dot is one person: ⬤ White ⬤ Black ⬤ Asian ⬤ Hispanic ⬤ Multiracial ⬤ Native American/Other

Buckeye, Arizona – Racial and ethnic composition Note: the US Census treats Hispanic/Latino as an ethnic category. This table excludes Latinos from the racial categories and assigns them to a separate category. Hispanics/Latinos may be of any race.
Race / Ethnicity (NH = Non-Hispanic)	Pop 2000	Pop 2010	Pop 2020	% 2000	% 2010	% 2020
White alone (NH)	3,748	25,375	43,071	57.34%	49.88%	47.07%
Black or African American alone (NH)	215	3,412	6,187	3.29%	6.71%	6.76%
Native American or Alaska Native alone (NH)	86	602	947	1.32%	1.18%	1.03%
Asian alone (NH)	24	849	1,435	0.37%	1.67%	1.57%
Pacific Islander alone (NH)	0	79	234	0.00%	0.16%	0.26%
Some Other Race alone (NH)	4	100	484	0.06%	0.20%	0.53%
Mixed Race or Multi-Racial (NH)	64	970	3,507	0.98%	1.91%	3.83%
Hispanic or Latino (any race)	2,396	19,489	35,637	36.65%	38.31%	38.95%
Total	6,537	50,876	91,502	100.00%	100.00%	100.00%

=== 2020 census ===
As of the 2020 census, Buckeye had a population of 91,502. The median age was 34.5 years. 27.9% of residents were under the age of 18 and 13.9% of residents were 65 years of age or older. For every 100 females there were 107.2 males, and for every 100 females age 18 and over there were 108.7 males age 18 and over.

85.1% of residents lived in urban areas, while 14.9% lived in rural areas.

There were 27,781 households in Buckeye, of which 43.5% had children under the age of 18 living in them. Of all households, 62.1% were married-couple households, 12.4% were households with a male householder and no spouse or partner present, and 17.5% were households with a female householder and no spouse or partner present. About 14.0% of all households were made up of individuals and 6.0% had someone living alone who was 65 years of age or older.

There were 30,860 housing units, of which 10.0% were vacant. The homeowner vacancy rate was 2.8% and the rental vacancy rate was 7.1%.

Racial composition as of the 2020 census
Race	Number	Percent
White	51,761	56.6%
Black or African American	6,629	7.2%
American Indian and Alaska Native	1,689	1.8%
Asian	1,584	1.7%
Native Hawaiian and Other Pacific Islander	297	0.3%
Some other race	14,848	16.2%
Two or more races	14,694	16.1%
Hispanic or Latino (of any race)	35,637	38.9%

=== Historical population ===
Buckeye first appeared on the 1910 U.S. Census as a precinct of Maricopa County. It appeared again in 1920 as the 48th precinct of Maricopa County (Buckeye). It incorporated as a town in 1929 and has appeared on every successive census. On January 1, 2014, Buckeye was upgraded to city status.

=== 2010 census ===
As of the census of 2010, there were 50,876 people residing in 16,499 households in the city. The population density was 135.6 inhabitants per square mile (52.4/km^{2}). There were 18,207 housing units. 10.8% of the population were born overseas.

In terms of age brackets, the population was spread out, with 9.1% under the age of 5; 30.6% under the age of 18; 53% aged between 18 and 64 and 6.7% were 65 years of age or older. 45.4% percent of the population are women.

=== 2012–2016 estimates ===
From 2012 to 2016, the median income for a household in the town was $58,711. The per capita income for the town was $20,446. Both of these numbers are in 2016 dollars. About 12.4% of the population were below the poverty line.

== Economy ==
Top employers in the city of Buckeye as of 2018.

#	Employer	# of Employees
1	State of Arizona	1,220
2	Walmart	1,120
3	Buckeye Union High School District	500
4	City of Buckeye	480
5	Litchfield Elementary School District	470
6	Buckeye Elementary School District	320
7	Clayton Homes Inc.	300
8	Liberty Elementary School District	230
9	Agua Fria Union High School District	160
10	Youngker High School	150

== Parks and recreation ==
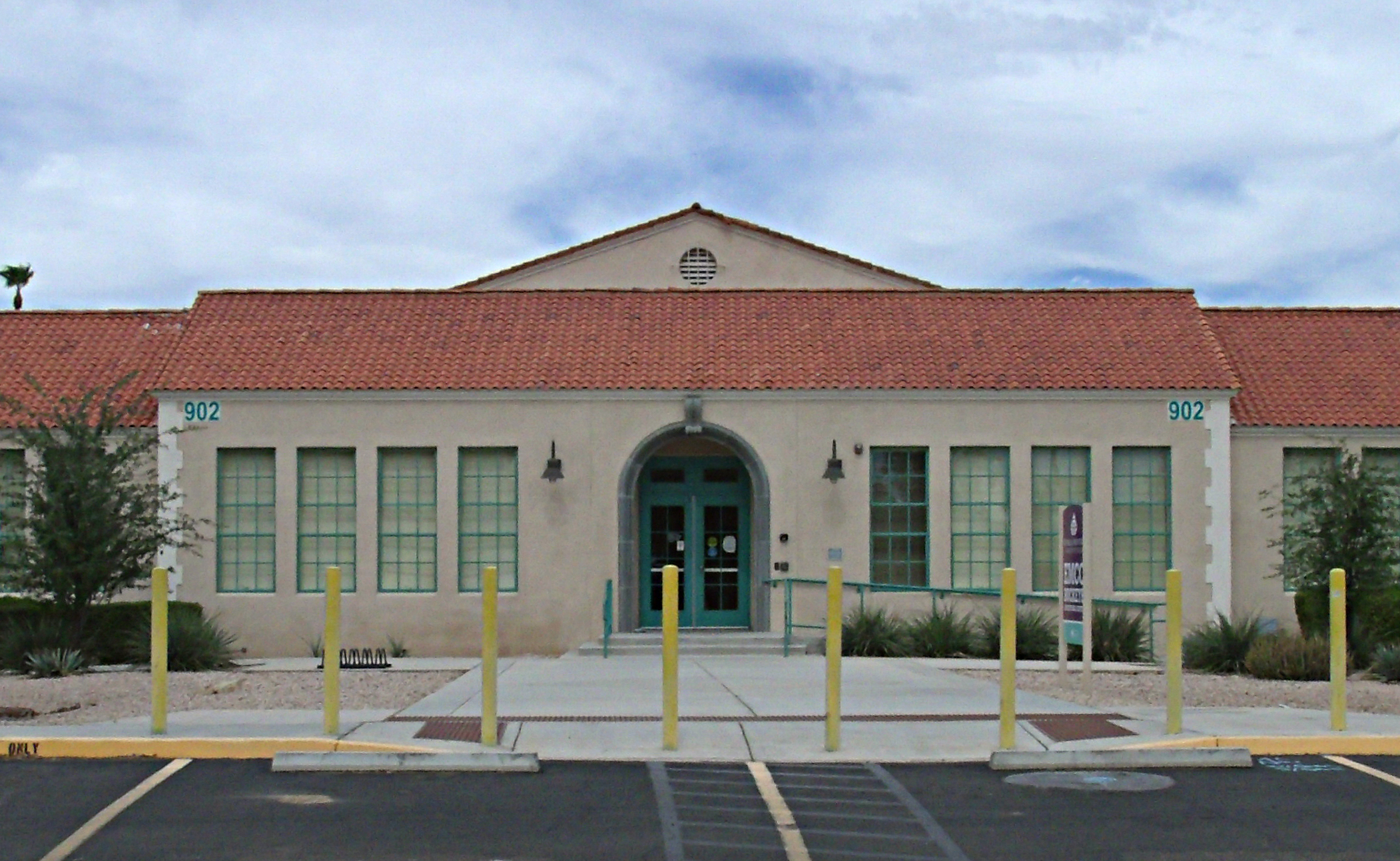
The Buckeye Union High School A-Wing is listed on the National Register of Historic Places.

A popular recreation destination in Buckeye is the Buckeye Hills Regional Park. It is located 7 miles (11 km) south of downtown Buckeye on State Route 85, at mile marker 144. A 900-acre (3.6 km^{2}) Buckeye Lake is planned.

The City of Buckeye's Skyline Regional Park is an 8,700 acres (3,500 ha) mountain preserve located in the southern White Tank Mountains. As of August 2020, the park features just under 20 miles (32 km) of trails for hikers, mountain bikers and equestrians, picnic areas and camping. Entry to the park is free.

== Education ==
The city of Buckeye is served by the following school districts:

- Wickenburg Unified School District
- Saddle Mountain Unified School District #90
- Agua Fria Union High School District
- Buckeye Union High School District
- Buckeye Elementary School District
- Liberty Elementary School District
- Litchfield Elementary School District
- Morristown Elementary School District
- Palo Verde Elementary School District

Other schools:

- The Odyssey Preparatory Academy

Estrella Mountain Community College recently renovated the original historic Buckeye Union High School building on Eason Avenue near 9th Street, also known as the "A" Wing, and started holding classes in this new satellite facility in the fall of 2011. Named the Buckeye Educational Center, this facility provides academic courses, job training programs and community education classes.

== Media ==
There are several local newspapers, including the West Valley View, and The Arizona Republic's Southwest Valley edition, the Buckeye Independent and the Buckeye Press.

Defunct media organizations include The Buckeye Star, Buckeye Valley News and the Buckeye Sun.

== Infrastructure ==
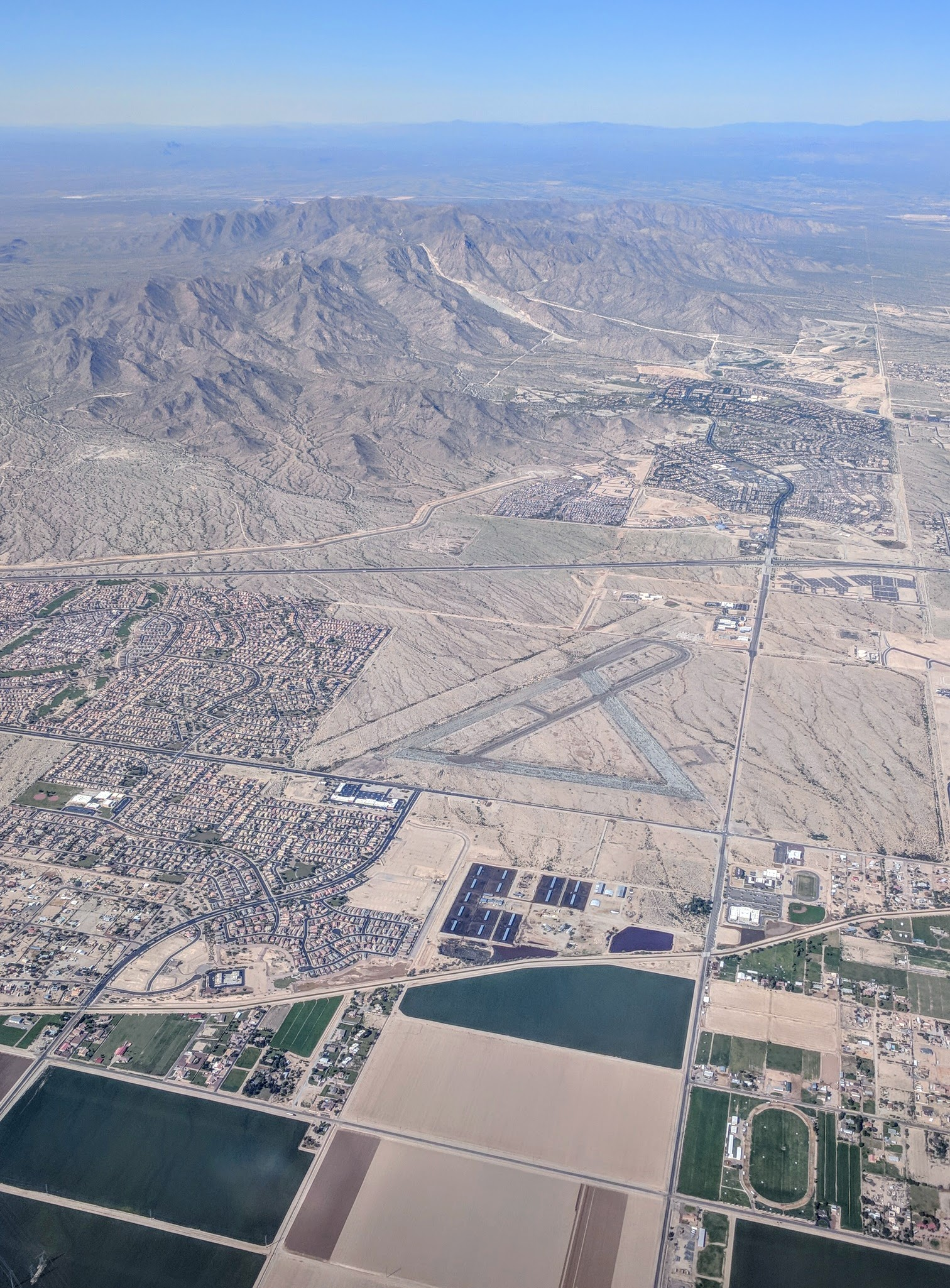
Aerial view from the south, of the northeast corner of Buckeye, Arizona, with the abandoned Goodyear Field, or Luke Air Force Auxiliary Airfield#6, a training field used during WWII, between the Roosevelt Irrigation District main canal and Interstate 10. Goodyear, Arizona, is the adjacent city to the east (right).

=== Transportation ===
Buckeye is served by five highways, a municipal airport, several nearby airports, and the railroad.

==== Roads ====
Major roadways serving the city include:

- Interstate 10
- SR 85
- Sun Valley Parkway
- Maricopa County (MC) 85

==== Bus ====
Buckeye is served by Valley Metro via a rural bus line connecting Phoenix–Goodyear–Gila Bend–Ajo. Valley Metro also provides express commute service from Buckeye to downtown Phoenix.

==== Rail ====
In 1910, the Arizona Eastern Railroad came to Buckeye; the first car in 1911; a steam rail line connected it to Phoenix by 1912; and a state highway by 1915. The coming of the railroad was so significant that the business district was moved to accommodate the location of the railroad station. As a result, Buckeye was booming. By 1912, major buildings were constructed, along with expansion of the business community.

Union Pacific operates a rail line running east–west generally through the center of the city.

==== Air ====
The Buckeye Municipal Airport (ICAO identifier KBXK) is owned and operated by the city government. Scheduled commercial air service is at Phoenix Sky Harbor or Mesa Gateway airport.

== Notable people ==
- Kole Calhoun, (1987–), baseball outfielder
- Sue Hardesty (1933–2022), writer
- Upton Sinclair (1878–1968), author
