= EFHS =

EFHS may refer to:

- East Forsyth High School (North Carolina), Kernersville, North Carolina, United States
- Edsel Ford High School, Dearborn, Michigan, United States
- Elizabeth Forward High School, Elizabeth, Pennsylvania, United States
- Estrella Foothills High School, Goodyear, Arizona, United States
