= Buckeye Union High School =

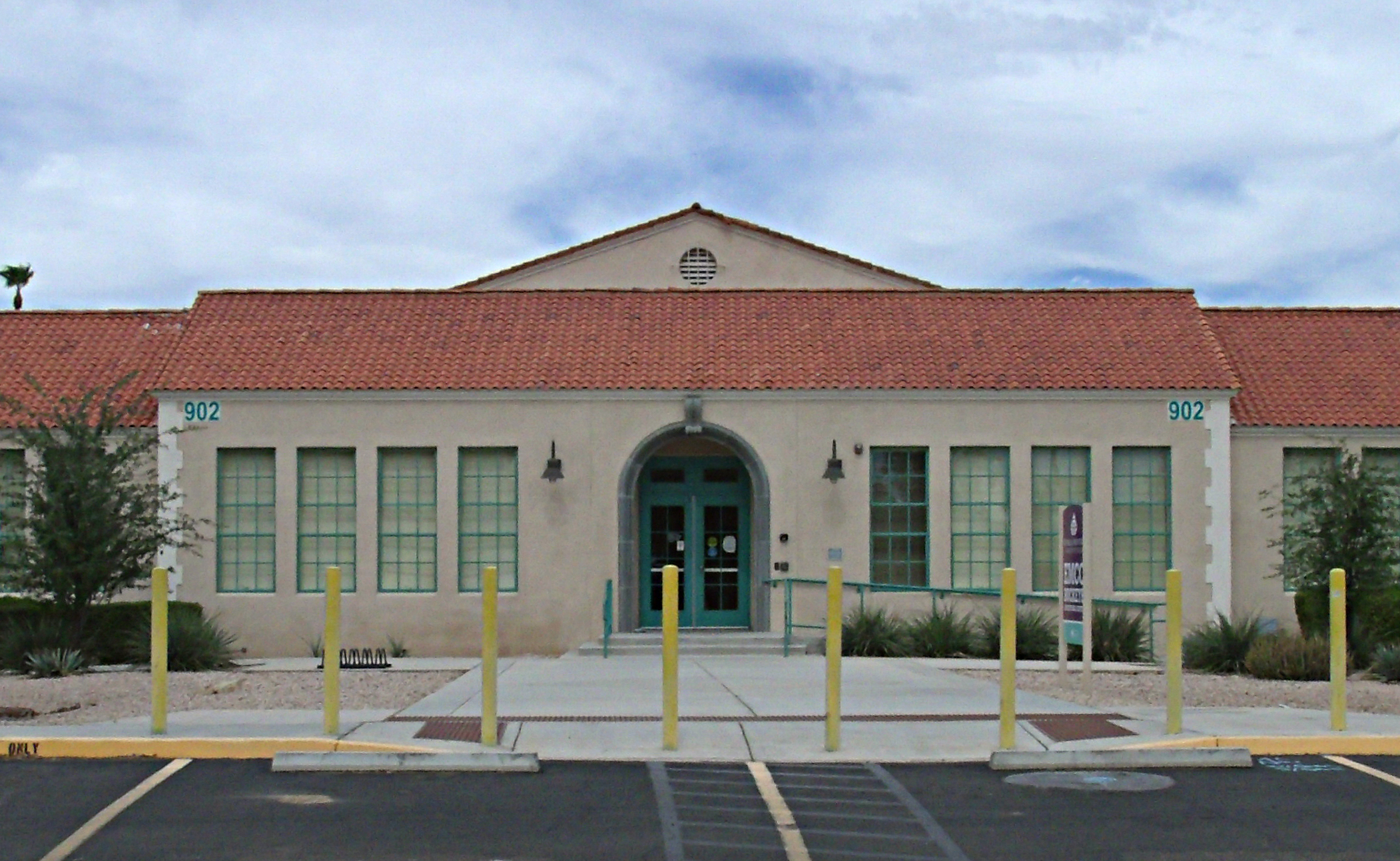

Location
- 1000 E. Narramore; Buckeye, AZ 85326; United States; 33°22′33″N 112°34′32″W

Information
- Type: Public high school
- Established: 1921
- School district: Buckeye Union High School District
- Teaching staff: 77.50 (FTE)
- Grades: 9-12
- Enrollment: 1,824 (2023–2024)
- Colors: Blue and gold
- Mascot: Hawk
- Website: Buckeye Union High School

Buckeye Union High School is a public high school in Buckeye, Arizona, under the jurisdiction of the Buckeye Union High School District.

== History ==
The first students in the town of Buckeye graduated in 1921. Regular graduating classes began the next year for what was then known as Buckeye High School, and there were 23 alumni by 1925. In its first few years, the high school used four rooms of the Buckeye elementary school on Sixth Street; the other four, on the other side of the building, were used for the lower grades. Finally, the towns of Buckeye, Palo Verde, Arlington, and Liberty came together with the goal of forming an accredited high school. In the fall of 1929, the new Buckeye Union High School (serving several elementary school districts) opened its doors with some 100 students.

The school's mascot changed twice in the first ten years as the school's athletics program developed. A football team was first organized in 1923. The original name for the school's teams was the Wildcats at the creation of interscholastic sports in 1925, followed by the Buckeyes in the late 1920s, then the Hawks in 1929 (beating out Farmers in a schoolwide vote). Other traditions were being solidified: the school's first yearbook was published in 1925 (the yearbook title changed twice before the current "Falcon" in 1935). The original school song "Hurrah for the Blue and Gold" was written in 1924.

The 1930s saw continued student growth; the enrollment was 229 by 1941, necessitating more facilities. In late 1929, a building blitz began: two wings, an auditorium, and a gymnasium. The WPA helped the school in the 1930s to build a shop and garage, dressing rooms for the auditorium, tennis courts, and a lit football field with bleachers.

Buckeye Union continued growing; there were 280 students by 1950. A new football field came with the B building; a new gymnasium highlighted the middle of the decade; the front of the shop was partly rebuilt in 1959. By 1960, with 550 students, the district hired its first superintendent. Under Chester D. McNabb, Buckeye Union High School continued its expansion. Student traditions continued to evolve, with a new fight song ("BUHS, Hats Off to You") popularized in the mid-1960s. The C, D, and E wings helped to accommodate a student boom (832 students by 1975), a new library opened, the campus received landscaping, and the football stadium was expanded. The faculty size had nearly doubled by 1975. At the same time, in the wake of the passage of Title IX, girls' athletics expanded from just tennis to a fully featured program.

The growth finally stabilized out at about 800 students in the 1980s and early 1990s, but bonds passed in 1980 and 1990 enabled the district to invest in updated facilities and a computer-networked campus. The expansion and modernization enabled Buckeye Union to handle a two-year bump of more than 100 students from 1993 to 1995. The new growth was unremitting, as Buckeye Union enrollment crossed the 1,000 mark.

At last, Buckeye Union High School was overcrowded. With the district's service area continuing to develop, a second high school was needed. Ground broke in 2000 for the new Estrella Foothills High School, and the school opened in August 2001.

With an eye to needed modernization (the main building on campus was the old 1929 A building), renovation plans began. Ground broke in January 2003 for a new Buckeye Union campus; within a year, students had been moved to the new plant. The old B, C, D, and E wings were demolished, and further phases of the project unfolded throughout the 2000s with a new gymnasium, tennis courts, parking lots, and (in the final 2008 phase) a performing arts center and refurbished baseball field.

By 2006, Buckeye Union had 1,646 students. The district embarked on building yet another high school. In August 2007, Youngker High School opened its doors. The new school helped to bring down Buckeye Union's enrollment to 1,136 in 2011–12.

On Tuesday, August 22, 2016, a 10th grade student, Ms Mariah Havard, was asked to remove her "Black Lives Matter" T-shirt for her school picture. There was subsequently a peaceful protest demonstration by about 10 students and some parents. The school principal and superintendent issued a public apology, and staff was trained on cultural sensitivity as a result of the issue.

== National Register of Historic Places listing ==
- Buckeye Union High School School A-Wing
- U.S. National Register of Historic Places
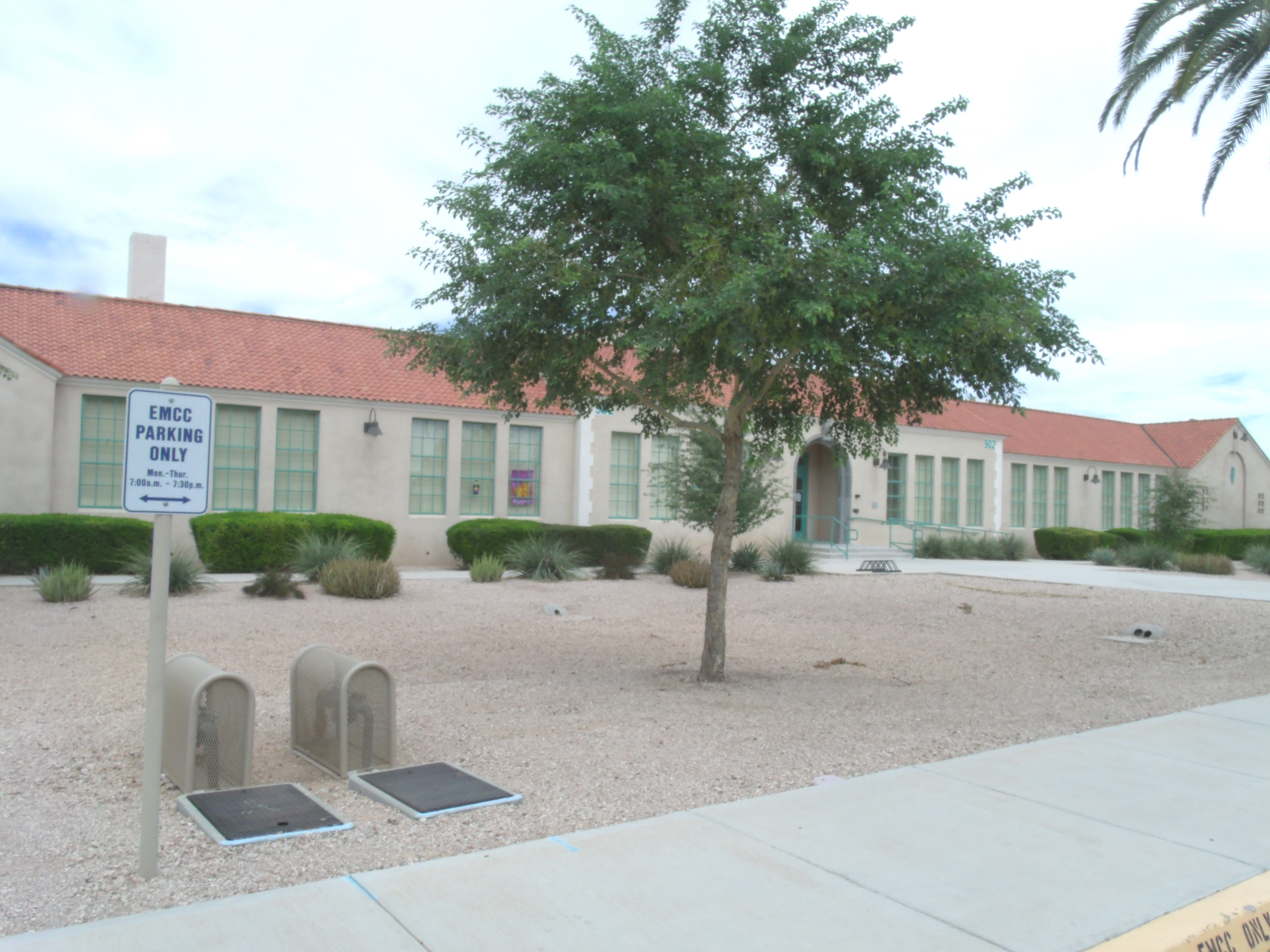

- Location within Arizona Location within the United States
- Location: 902 E. Eason Ave., Buckeye, Arizona
- Coordinates: 33°22′31″N 112°34′39″W
- Area: 2 acres (0.81 ha)
- Built: 1928
- Architect: Lescher & Mahoney
- Architectural style: Mission/Spanish Revival
- NRHP reference No.: 09001160
- Added to NRHP: December 30, 2009

The school's A-wing, now owned by the town of Buckeye, was listed on the National Register of Historic Places at the end of 2009. The official address of the school changed from 902 E. Eason Avenue to 1000 E. Narramore at the same time.

The building was designed in the Mission/Spanish Colonial Revival style by Lescher & Mahoney, a Phoenix architectural firm that was instrumental in the design of several NRHP-listed school buildings.

It is currently used by Estrella Mountain Community College as a distance learning center. The classrooms have been renovated, but older aspects do remain.

== Notable alumni ==
- Kole Calhoun, current MLB player (Texas Rangers)
- Sine Kerr, politician

== Renewable energy ==
Located on the campus is a solar photovoltaic array, part of project spread between three sites, Buckeye Union High School, Youngker High School, and Estrella Foothills High School. The project began in 2012, when the Buckeye Union School district entered into a 25-year agreement with Constellation Energy, an energy company based in Baltimore, Maryland. As per this agreement, Constellation Energy installed, owns, and will maintain the $18.6 million worth of equipment, and the Buckeye school district will purchase energy produced by the system at a fixed rate of $.098 per kilowatt hour. The agreement is expected to result in $100,000 of annual savings for the school district, and offset 2,296,422 lbs of CO_{2} per year.
