= Skyline Regional Park =

Park in Maricopa County, Arizona

- Interactive map of Skyline Regional Park
- Type: Mountain preserve
- Location: Buckeye, Arizona
- Area: 8,700 acres (3,500 ha)

Skyline Regional Park (Arizona)

Skyline Regional Park is an 8700-acre mountain preserve located in west-central Maricopa County, Arizona. The park is at the southern edge of the White Tank Mountains, within the arid Sonora Desert. The park is on a 25-year lease from BLM to the city of Buckeye, after which it reverts to the city.

== Activities ==
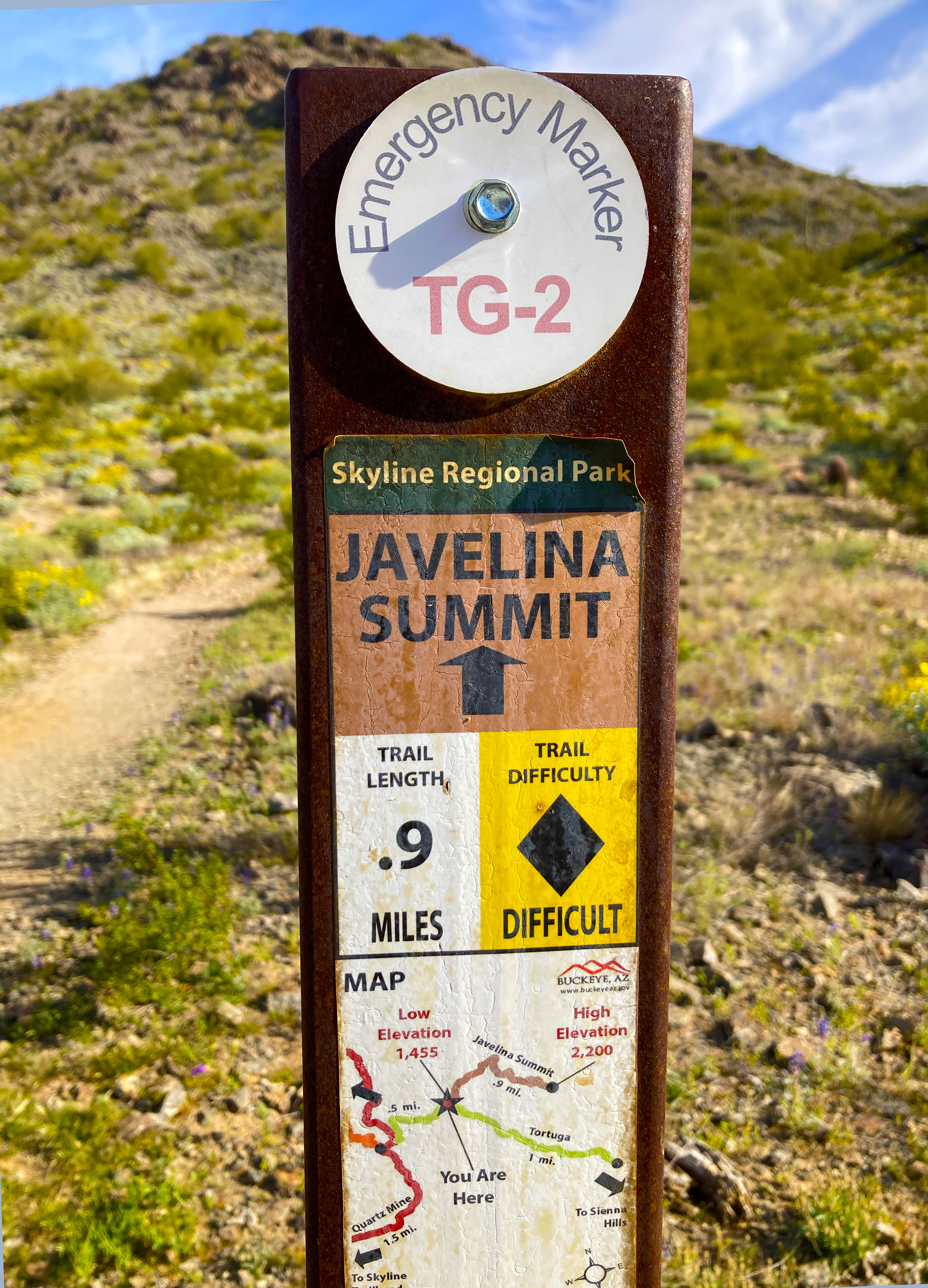
Javelina summit

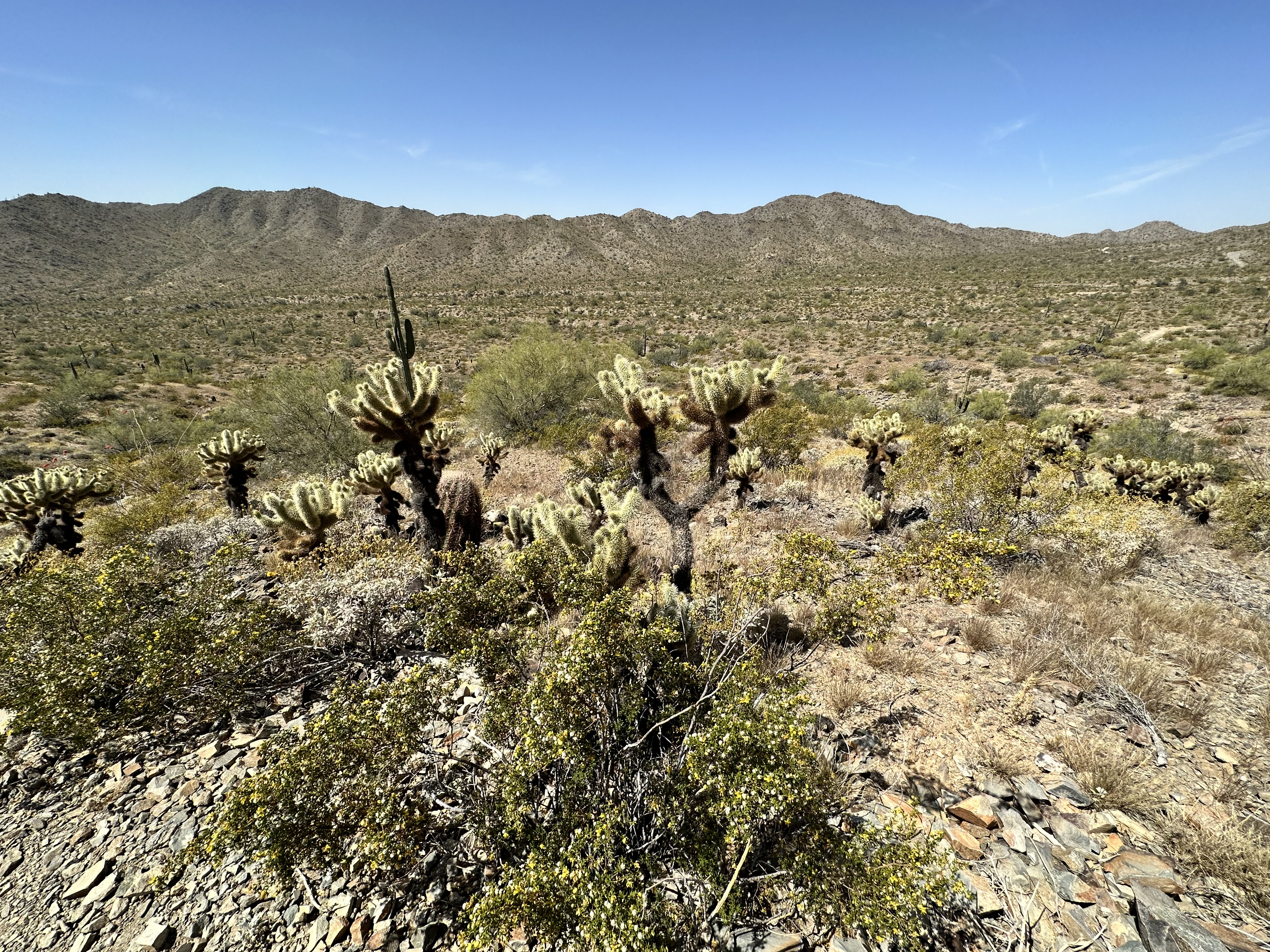
Flora of park with Gila Bend Mountains in distance

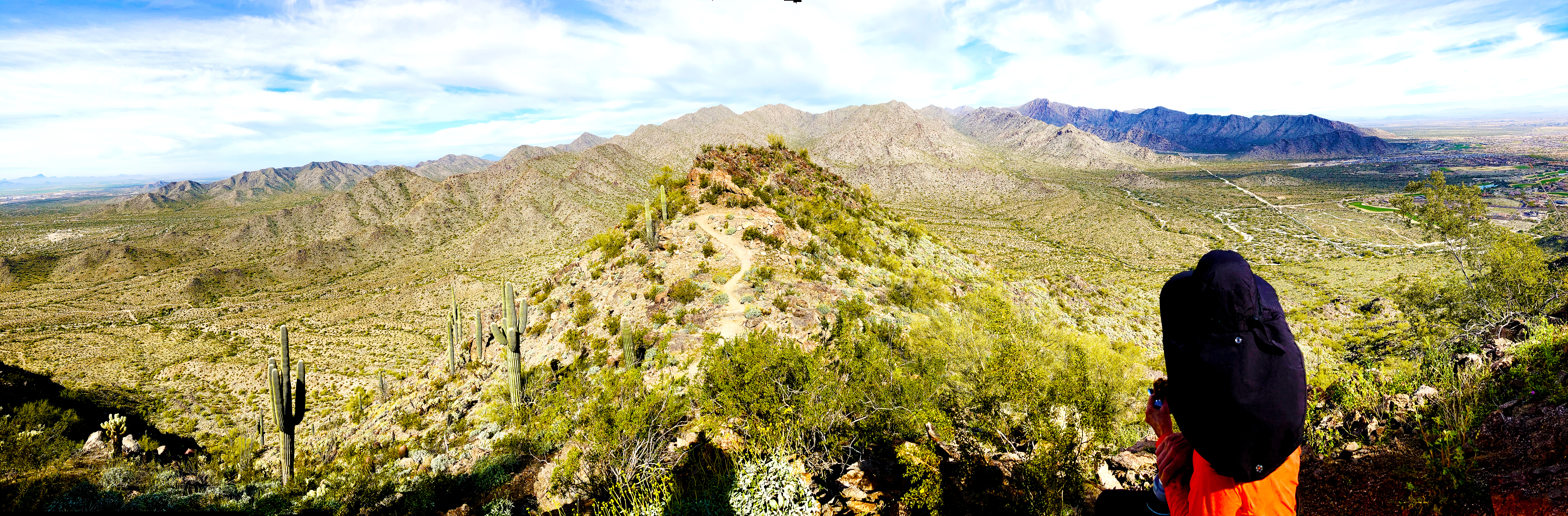
View from Javelina summit

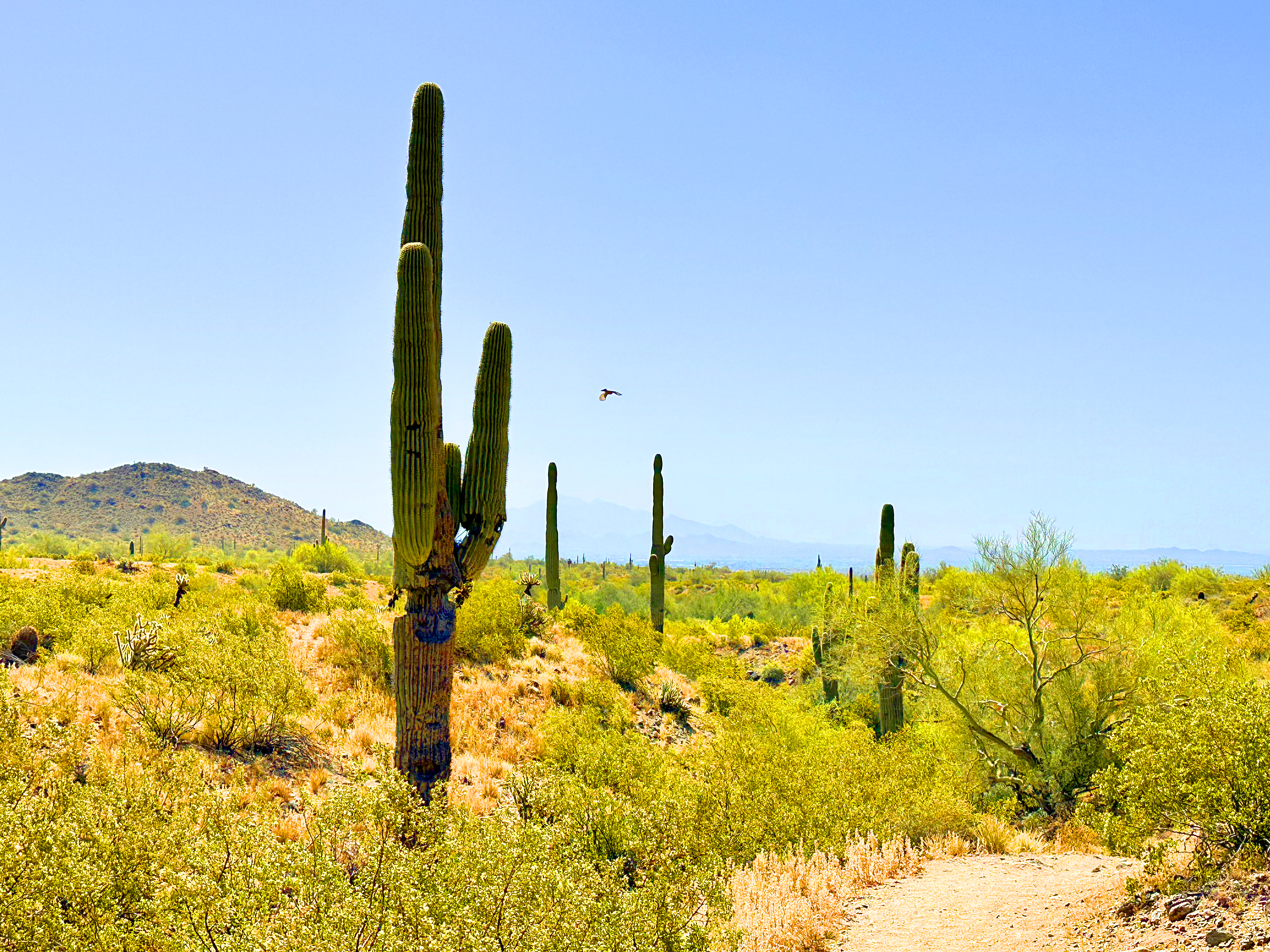
Desert flora, Skyline Park

It opened in 2016 with seven miles of trails, which have expanded to over 20 miles with a of mix of hiking, biking and equestrian trails. The most popular trail is the four mile Turnbuckle Loop Trail. The Crest Mountain summit vista offers unobstructed views of the Sierra Estrella Mountains to the northeast, Gila Bend Mountains in the southwest and the Big Horn Mountains Wilderness and the Hassayampa Plain in the northwest. The Javelina summit offers unobstructed views of downtown Phoenix, the Sierra Estrallas and the extensive desert plains. The Skyline Crest trail contains the highest peak, at 3152 feet, with a key col of 2760 ft. Other amenities include ramadas and shaded picnic and dry camping areas. With clear desert nights and remoteness from urban lights, the park is known for its dark skies. Stargazing activities are regularly scheduled; the park hosts "Star Party" events where visitors can learn about the night sky from local astronomers. In 2018 the park added 0.6 miles of accessible trails that can be used by strollers and wheelchairs. Bicycles and horses are not allowed on these trails. These trails have educational interpretive panels about native plants and animals. Guided group hikes are scheduled monthly.

== Flora and fauna ==
Also see: Flora of the Sonoran Desert
Also see: Fauna of the Sonoran Desert

The landscape is desert and mountain. Desert mule deer, javelina, desert fox, raptors and Sonoran Desert tortoise are found in the park. Vegetation includes ironwood, palo verde and mesquite trees; many types of cacti are also found.

== Geology ==
Text adapted from Wikipedia article White Tank Mountains: "The mountains were formed through tectonic activities as part of a detachment fault ... about 30 million years ago. Fairly young in geologic terms, it has not been subject to the forces of erosion for long and retains an extremely rugged topography composed of rocky fault ridges and deep canyons. During seasonal heavy rainfall, accumulated water tends to rush rapidly through the steep canyons, over time scouring out a number of depressions or 'tanks' in the white granite near the base of the mountains." This text is used under Creative Commons Attribution-ShareAlike 3.0 Unported License.
