= BXK =

BXK or bxk may refer to:

- BXK, the IATA and FAA LID code for Buckeye Municipal Airport, Arizona, United States
- bxk, the ISO 639-3 code for Bukusu dialect, Kenya
