= Corey Hawkins (basketball) =

American basketball player (born 1991)

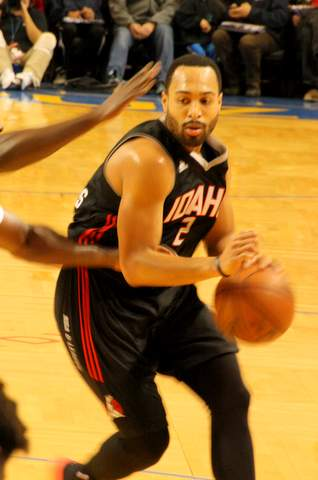
- Hawkins with the Idaho Stampede in 2016

Personal information
- Born: August 10, 1991 (age 35) Philadelphia, Pennsylvania, U.S.
- Listed height: 6 ft 1 in (1.85 m)
- Listed weight: 200 lb (91 kg)

Career information
- High school: Estrella Foothills (Goodyear, Arizona)
- College: Arizona State (2010–2011); UC Davis (2012–2015)
- NBA draft: 2015: undrafted
- Playing career: 2015–2017
- Position: Guard
- Coaching career: 2024–present

Career history

Playing
- 2015: Sioux Falls Skyforce
- 2015–2016: Idaho Stampede
- 2016: The Flexx Pistoia
- 2016–2017: Antwerp Giants
- 2017: VEF Rīga

Coaching
- 2024–2026: Osceola Magic (assistant)

Career highlights
- Big West Player of the Year (2015); 2× First-team All-Big West (2013, 2015); Second-team All-Big West (2014); Fourth-team Parade All-American (2010)
- Stats at Basketball Reference

Corey Hawkins (born August 10, 1991) is an American former professional basketball player who most recently served as an assistant coach for the Osceola Magic of the NBA G League. He played college basketball with the UC Davis Aggies, and was a three-time all-conference selection in the Big West Conference. As a senior in 2014–15, he was named the Big West Player of the Year.

Hawkins is the son of National Basketball Association (NBA) player Hersey Hawkins. In high school in Arizona, he set state scoring records, and was named a Parade All-American as a senior. He began his college career with Arizona State, but transferred after one season to UC Davis. As a member of the Aggies, he twice led the Big West in scoring.

== Early life ==
Hawkins was born in Philadelphia to Jennifer and Hersey Hawkins, who was playing basketball professionally with the Philadelphia 76ers in the NBA. Hawkins went to high school at Estrella Foothills High in Goodyear, Arizona, where he was a member of three state title teams. He also set Arizona high school records for most points in a career (3,164) and season (1,152 in 2009–10). He averaged 36 points per game as a senior, when he was named a fourth-team Parade All-American.

== College career ==
Hawkins began his college career with the Arizona State Sun Devils. As a freshman in 2010–11, he played in 24 games but scored only 49 points. After an unfulfilling season at Arizona State, Hawkins transferred to the University of California, Davis, whose basketball program was coached by Jim Les, a former college teammate of Hawkins' father at Bradley. Forced to sit out a year due to National Collegiate Athletic Association (NCAA) transfer rules, Hawkins led the Big West Conference in scoring (20.3 points per game) in his first season with UC Davis in 2012–13, when he also earned first-team all-conference honors. He earned second-team All-Big West honors as a junior, when he averaged 18.0 points.

In his final year in 2014–15, Hawkins led the conference in scoring (20.9) again, and added 4.9 rebounds and 3.4 assists while leading the Aggies to a regular-season Big West title. He also became the first Aggie to receive All-American honors from the Associated Press, who named Hawkins to their Honorable Mention list. He played in the Reese's College All-Star Game, earning most valuable player honors after scoring a game-high 20 points. At the end of his career, Hawkins and his father had combined to score 4,687 points in college, the second most in Division I history for a father–son combo behind only Dell and Stephen Curry (5,020).

== Professional career ==
=== 2015–16 season ===
After going undrafted in the 2015 NBA draft, Hawkins joined the Philadelphia 76ers for the Utah Summer League, but got no playing time for the 76ers, and later joined the Sacramento Kings for the Las Vegas Summer League where he was sidelined with a right ankle injury. On August 21, 2015, he signed with the Miami Heat, but was waived on October 19 after appearing in two preseason games.

On November 2, 2015, Hawkins was acquired by the Sioux Falls Skyforce of the NBA Development League as an affiliate player of the Heat. On November 14, he made his professional debut in a 98–95 loss to the Iowa Energy, recording three points in 13 minutes off the bench.

On December 31, 2015, Hawkins was traded to the Idaho Stampede in exchange for the returning player rights of Shane Gibson. On January 4, 2016, he made his debut for the Stampede in a 103–92 win over the Bakersfield Jam, recording four assists in fourteen minutes off the bench.

=== 2016–17 season ===
After joining the Golden State Warriors for the 2016 NBA Summer League, Hawkins signed with The Flexx Pistoia of the Italian Serie A on August 12, 2016. On November 23, 2016, he signed with the Belgian team Antwerp Giants.

== Coaching career ==
On October 27, 2024, Hawkins became an assistant coach for the Osceola Magic.
