= Tartesso =

Planned community in Buckeye, Arizona, United States

Tartesso is a 49,000 residential units planned community located off Sun Valley Parkway. Tartesso is the third largest development in Buckeye, Arizona.

== Tartesso plan ==
Tartesso was originally announced in 2005, but the project never went into development. The extended period of dormancy ended when Dolphin Partners of Irvine, California purchased more than 10,000 acres from Valley developer Jerry Bisgrove in September 2016.

Homebuilder D.R. Horton will be the major builder in the current phase of Tartesso. In October 2016, Dolphin's affiliate Tartesso Partners LLC sold DR Horton 158 lots for $3,822,500, or $24,200 per lot. D.R. Horton's Express Homes division opened its first Tartesso subdivision in late 2016, and closed homes in January 2017. In June 2017, D.R. Horton purchased an additional 1,894 lots for $60,258,790, or $31,800 per lot, from Tartesso Partners. D.R. Horton had "Grand Opening Pricing" at its Tartesso-DR Horton Series as of August 23, 2017.

The development was originally developed by Stardust Companies and may take 25 years to finish, but at build-out, it could have 100,000 to 150,000 residents. As of January 2008, 964 of 3,375 lots planned were occupied in the first phase.

At its completion, Tartesso will include a 500-acre town center, 17 elementary schools, three high schools, 26 parks, one hospital and create nearly 18,000 jobs.

== Tartesso schools ==
All of Tartesso schools are part of the Saddle Mountain Unified School District.
