= Buckeye Elementary School District =

School district in Maricopa County, Arizona

Buckeye Elementary School District 33 is a school district in Buckeye, Maricopa County, Arizona, feeding into Buckeye Union High School District. The district consists of seven K–8 schools, with more than 5,200 students and 650 staff.

== History ==
The first school in Buckeye was built in 1889. It was a one-room school made of lumber and located on the north side of Clanton Street between Fifth and Sixth Streets. Just one year after its construction, in 1890, W. J. Melton organized a Baptist church group which met there on Sundays and for socials. The school outgrew the building and had to move, but the church remained there until 1931. In 1903, Buckeye built a four-room, two-story, red brick building with an outdoor stairway with a woodshed under the stairway. It was situated just east of the original school and across from the present elementary school (211. S. Seventh Street, Buckeye, AZ 85326.) There were two large rooms on the ground floor and two upstairs.

In 1937, the Buckeye Elementary School was constructed on its current location.

As the community of Buckeye grew, so did the school district:

- 2003 - Bales Elementary School
- 2005 - Sundance Elementary School
- 2006 - WestPark Elementary School
- 2007 - Steven R. Jasinski Elementary School
- 2009 - Inca Elementary School
- 2017 - Marionneaux Elementary School
- 2021 - John S. McCain III Elementary School

Recent changes: BESD has shortened their school hours for the 23–24 school year. For many years, BESD followed this schedule: M, Tu, Th, F: 7 hr, 15 min W: 5 hr & 15 min

New schedule: M, Tu, Th, F: 6 hr, 45 min W: 4 hr

== Schools ==
=== K-8 ===
- Bales Elementary School
- Buckeye Elementary
- Inca Elementary
- John S. McCain III Elementary
- Marionneaux Elementary
- Steven R. Jasinski Elementary
- Sundance Elementary
- WestPark Elementary

=== Preschool ===
- Buckeye Preschool
