= List of mayors of Buckeye, Arizona =

Buckeye, Arizona mayors

The following is a list of mayors of the city of Buckeye, Arizona, USA.

== Mayors ==
- Hugh M. Watson, ca.1929
- Wesley G. Bidduph, ca.1949
- Jack Gable, ca.1952
- Hugh Watson Jr., 1956–1958
- Ted Pierce, ca.1961
- W. Earl Herring, ca.1963
- Jackie A. Meck, 1972–1975, 2008–2020
- Dusty Hull, ca.2005
- Eric Orsborn, c. 2020–present

== See also ==
- Buckeye, Arizona history
