= Sundance Towne Center =

Regional Shopping Center in Buckeye, Arizona

Coordinates: 33.440776°N 112.558053°W

Sundance Towne Center is a regional shopping center by Vestar Development located south of Interstate 10 on the intersections of S. Watson Road and W. Yuma Road in the city of Buckeye, Arizona. The first phase of development opened in the spring of 2007.

Major tenants include (as of May 2010):

- Lowe's (opened April 2007)
- PetSmart (opened July 2007)
- Wal-Mart SuperCenter (opened August 2007)
- OfficeMax (opened August 2007) (Closed)

Smaller retail and restaurant tenants include (as of May 2010):

- AutoZone
- Brakes Plus
- Carl's Jr. (Opened in Spring/Summer 2010)
- Chipotle Mexican Grill
- Cracker Barrel
- El Pollo Loco
- Fantastic Sams
- GameStop
- Go Wireless (Verizon Wireless)
- Hula Hawaiian BBQ (Closed)
- Juice It Up! (Closed)
- KFC
- Leslie's Swimming Pool Supplies
- M&I Bank (Closed)
- Nationwide Vision
- Payless ShoeSource (Closed)
- Panda Express
- Papa John's Pizza
- Peter Piper Pizza
- Quiznos Sub (Closed)
- Planet Beach (Closed)
- Pretty Nails & Spa
- Sleep America (Closed)
- State Farm Insurance
- Sundance Dental Group
- Taco Bell
- Wells Fargo
- Wienerschnitzel (Closed)
- Wendy's

Former tenants include (as of May 2010):

- Alltel (Closed due to acquisition by Verizon Wireless)
- Linens 'n Things (Closed due to corporate bankruptcy)
