= White Tank Mountain Regional Park =

Regional park in Maricopa County, Arizona

Coordinates: 33.5882664°N 112.548349°W

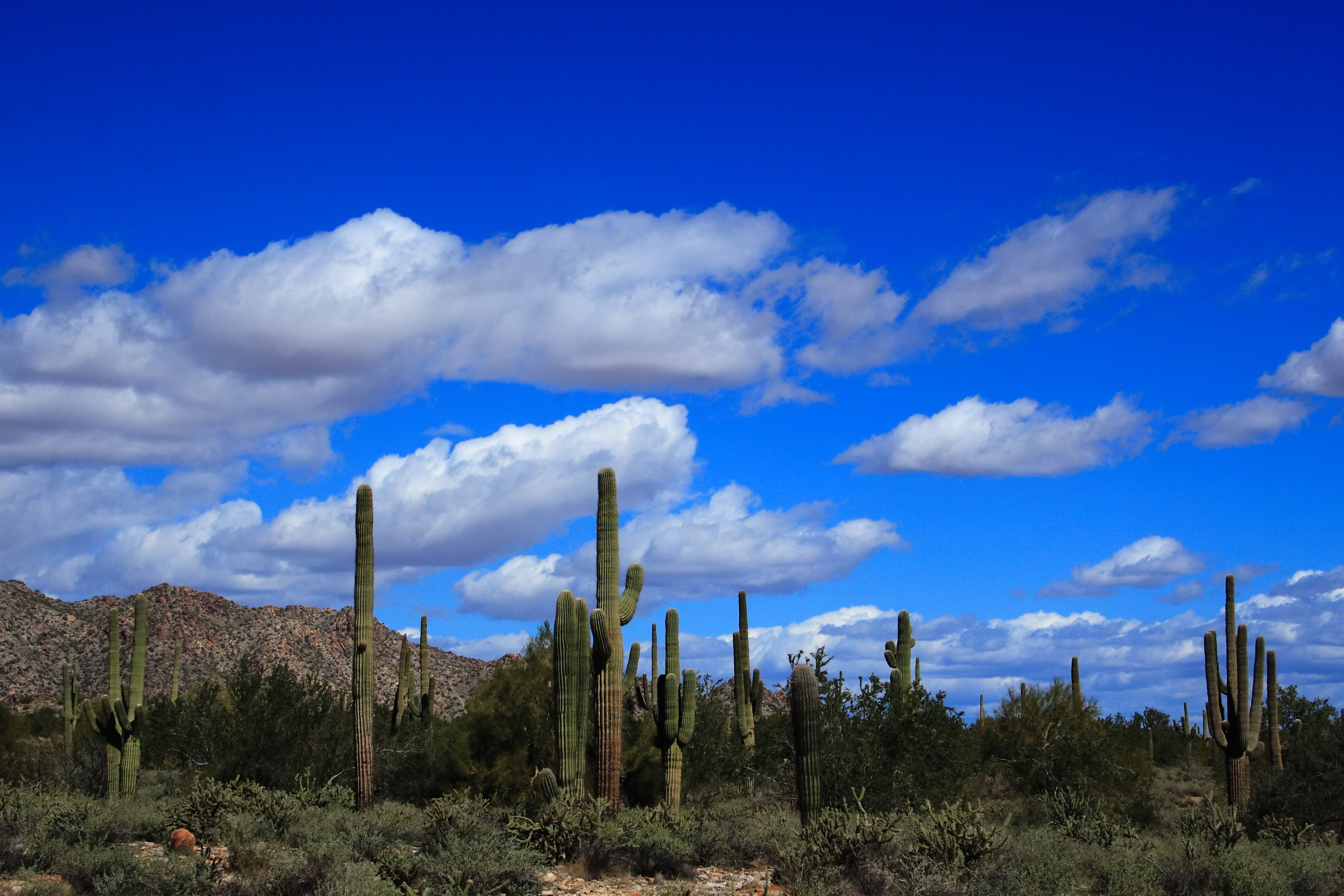
- Desert vegetation in the park.
- Interactive map of White Tank Mountain Regional Park
- Location: Maricopa County, Arizona, United States
- Nearest city: Waddell, Arizona
- Area: 29,271 acres (11,846 ha)
- Established: 1960's

The entrance to the park

The White Tank Mountain Regional Park is a large regional park located in west-central Maricopa County, Arizona. Encompassing 29,271 acres (45.736 sq mi; 118.456 km^{2}) of desert and mountain landscape, it is the largest regional park in the county. The bulk of the White Tank Mountains range is located within the park's boundaries.

The park was established in the 1960s.

== Activities ==
The developed portion of the park provides a number of outdoor recreational activities. Ramadas (generally shaded tables), picnic areas and campgrounds are available and often used for informal gathering places. Several of the campground areas are available for RV access and are semi-developed, including picnic tables, barbecue grills and restroom facilities equipped with showers.

The park is better renowned for its extensive network of hiking trails. Nearly 26 miles (42 km) of hiking trails wind through the terrain in the park, ranging in difficulty from a simple walk to moderately challenging. The most commonly used is the Waterfall trail, a 0.9-mile (1.4 km) walk that culminates in a narrow canyon featuring a seasonal waterfall. Bicycling and horseback riding are permitted on many of the trails. In addition to the network of hiking trails, the 10-mile (16 km) competitive track is designed for "high speeds, challenging one's skills, and racing".

Clear weather typical of the desert environment combined with darker skies due to the semirural setting provide for stargazing and amateur astronomy opportunities. The park hosts an organized stargazing event at various dates through the year. A number of other organized events take place regularly during the year, including interpretive nature hikes, guided health walks, and youth-oriented events.

=== White Tank Library and Nature Center ===
Opened in 2010 and located at the park's entrance, the White Tank Library and Nature Center is housed in a 29,000-square-foot LEED-certified building. The library features a large viewing area of the park. The nature center includes live native reptiles, an information center, and a gift shop. Nature education programs are offered for children, families, and adults.

== Environment and history ==
The park encompasses a large swath of desert and mountain environment and doubles as a natural preserve. The majority of the park is undeveloped wilderness prohibiting motorized vehicles except on existing roads. Hiking throughout the majority of the park is also restricted to marked trails. Some hunting is permitted within the park boundaries, but subject to restriction.

A number of local, indigenous species inhabit the park and are often spotted by park visitors, such as mule deer, coyotes, and javelinas, as well as several species of small rodents, and more rarely, mountain lions. A number of bird species are also common, including the roadrunner and the cactus wren, the official state bird of Arizona. Being in the desert, the park is also home to many species of reptiles, as well. Guided hikes offered by the park service offer visitors an excellent opportunity to learn about and view the native flora and fauna.

Although normally dry, the area is subject to sudden and sometimes severe flash flooding in the narrow canyons that run through the mountains, particularly during thunderstorms common in the late summer. While this creates a potential hazard situation, the appearance of temporary waterfalls in the rugged terrain is a seasonal attraction to park visitors.

=== Hohokam civilization ===
The mountains are also home to a number of archaeological sites, with 11 having been identified within the park boundaries, including seven Hohokam villages that were occupied between 500 and 1100 CE. The Black Rock Trail provides access to the remnants of one of these villages, although the remnants are not well preserved and often overlooked by casual visitors. More readily apparent are a number of petroglyphs scattered throughout the park. Most are of Hohokam origin, but some may have been created nearly 10,000 years ago, by Meso-Indians. Park visitors are encouraged to photograph petroglyphs or other archaeological remains, but park regulations prohibit touching or otherwise disturbing them.

Petroglyphs in the White Tank Mountain Regional Park

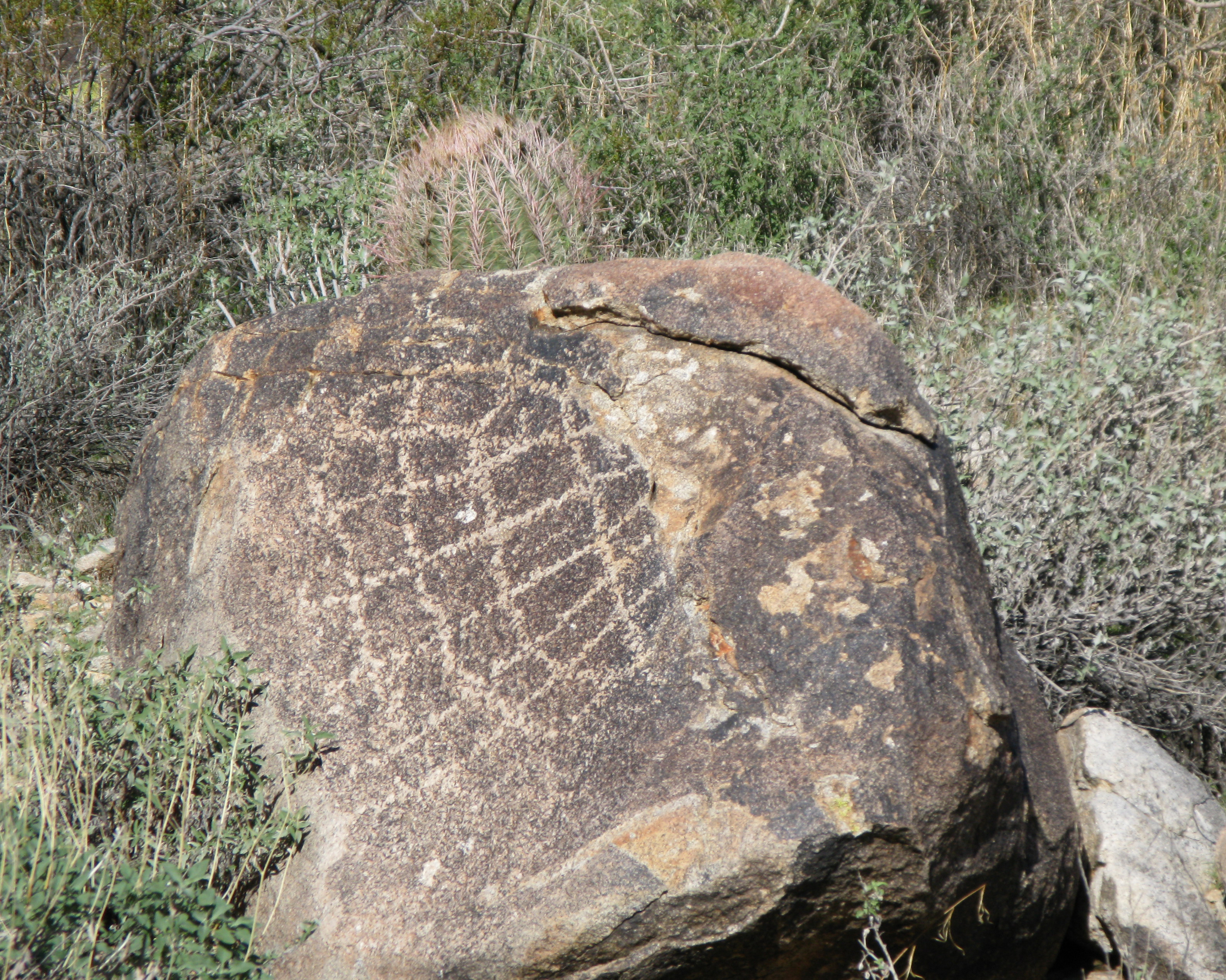

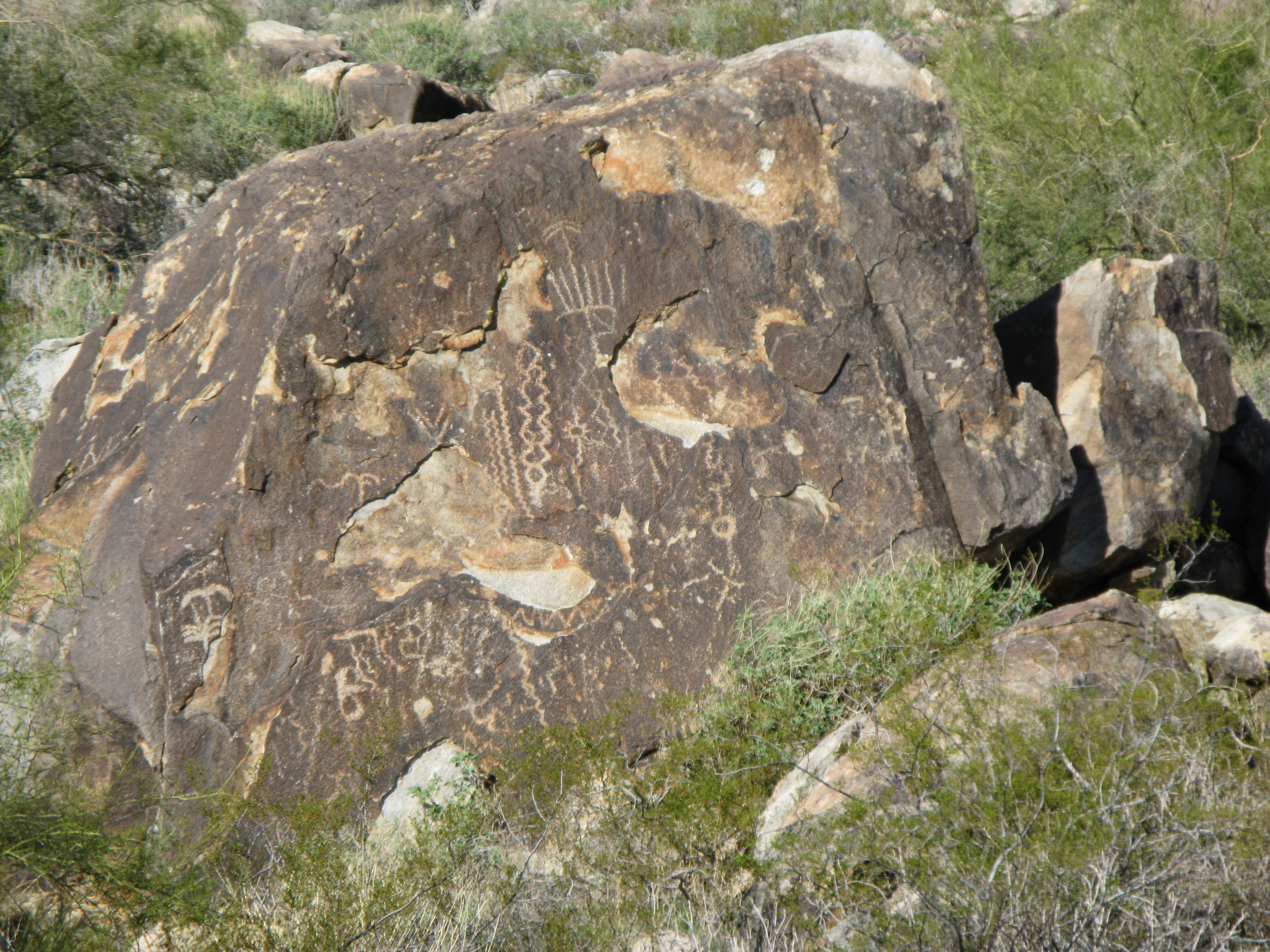

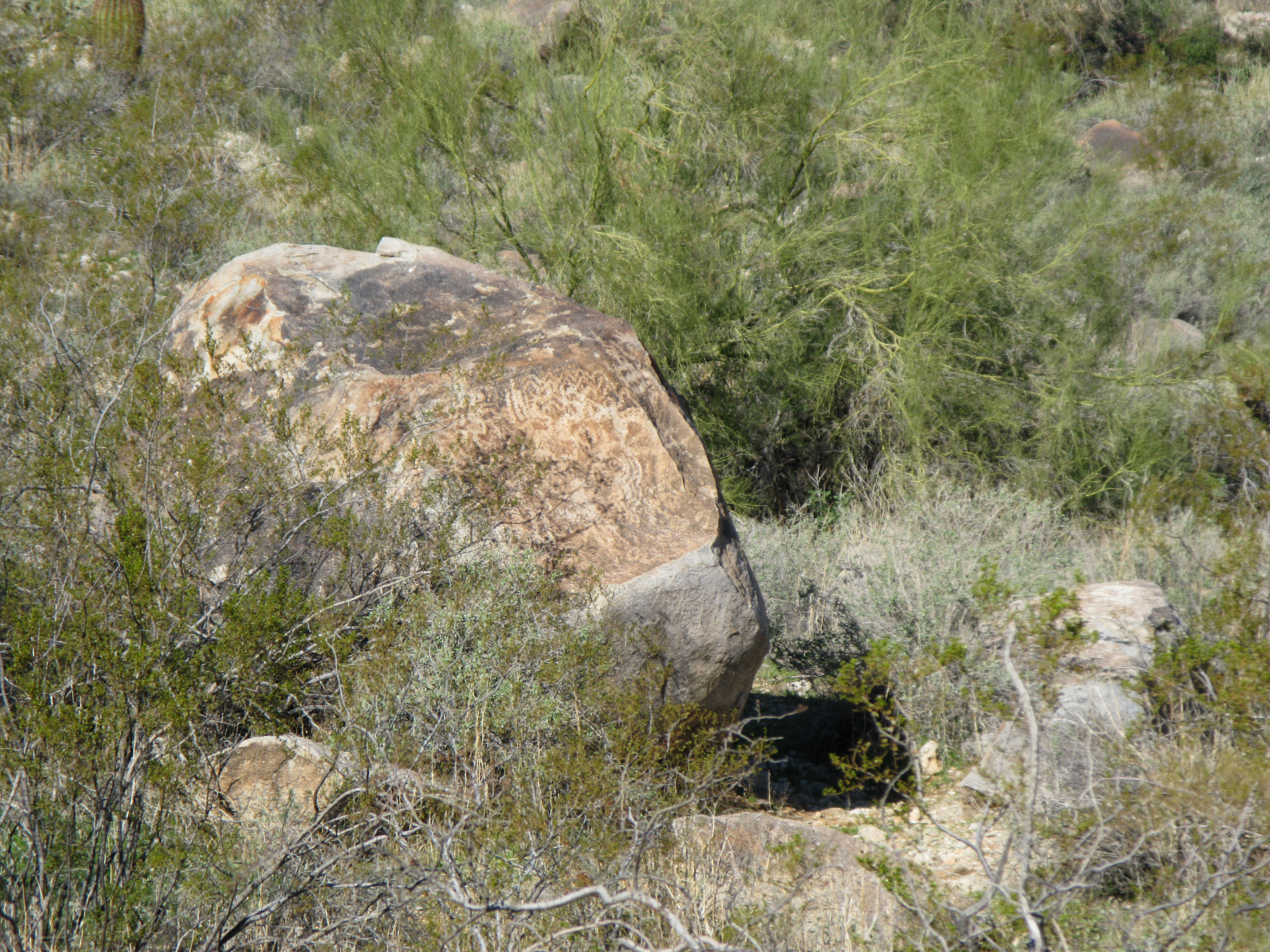

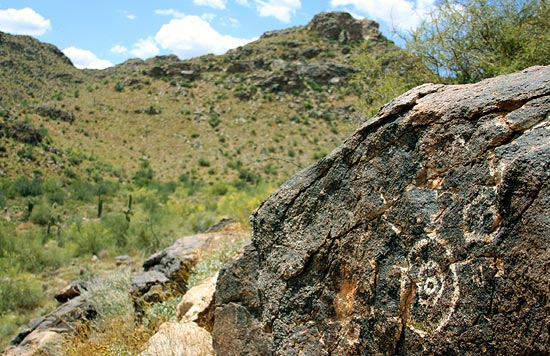

== Urban sprawl encroachment ==
The White Tank Regional Park is located on the western fringe of the Phoenix metropolitan area, and abuts the rapidly growing suburbs of Buckeye and Surprise. The rapid growth of these cities along with plans by various developers to construct large residential developments in the park's proximity has alarmed some environmentalists and park officials worried that the human impact may disrupt the area's ecology.

Surprise is adjacent to the park's north and east borders; in response to the environmental concerns, city planners have identified the White Tank Mountains and the adjoining desert environment's preservation as one of the most critical planning issues in their general plan. To that end, the plan includes a greenbelt "buffer" between residential development and the park. Critics respond that the park will still suffer the effects of being isolated from surrounding areas, becoming in effect an ecological island.

== See also ==
- Sonoran Desert
