= Buckeye Valley (Arizona) =

Valley in Maricopa County, Arizona, US

Buckeye Valley is a valley on the north side of the great bend in the Gila River, in Maricopa County, Arizona. Its mouth is at an elevation of 853 feet / 260 meters. Its head is at an elevation of 922 feet at 33°23′58″N 112°21′25″W.

== History ==
For over 2,000 years, the Hohokam culture flourished in Buckeye Valley. Massive irrigation techniques were developed that allowed crops to develop, architecture, as well as Mesoamerican ballcourts.
