= White Tank Mountains =

Mountain range in central Arizona

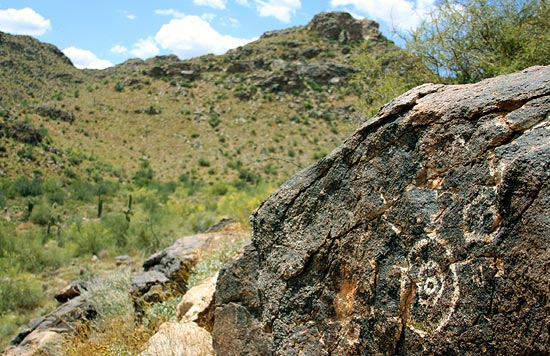
- Petroglyphs in the White Tank Mountains

Highest point
- Elevation: 4,083 ft (1,244 m)
- Coordinates: 33°34′31″N 112°34′44″W

Geography
- Location within Arizona Location within the United States
- Location: Maricopa County, Arizona, United States
- Topo map: USGS White Tank Mountains (AZ)

Geology
- Rock age: 35 Ma
- Mountain type: Metamorphic

The White Tank Mountains are a mountain range in Maricopa County, Arizona. The mountains are on the western periphery of the Phoenix metropolitan area, primarily flanked by the suburban cities of Buckeye to the southwest, and Surprise to the northeast. The mountain range is home to the White Tank Mountain Regional Park and is a regional recreation hub.

The range, often referred to the White Tanks, is a moderate-sized mountain range whose peaks rise to an elevation around 4,000 feet (1,219 m). The range consists of a series of numerous ridges, peaks, and canyons, and as such, lacks a single, prominent peak. The highest point in the range, at an elevation of 4,083 feet (1,244 m), is Barry Goldwater Peak.

The mountain range was formed through tectonic activities as part of a detachment fault sometime in the mid-Tertiary period, about 30 million years ago. Fairly young in geologic terms, it has not been subject to the forces of erosion for long and retains an extremely rugged topography composed of rocky fault ridges and deep canyons. During heavy rainfall, accumulated water tends to rush rapidly through the steep canyons, over time scouring out a number of depressions or "tanks" in the white granite near the base of the mountains. These white tanks are the source of the mountains' name.

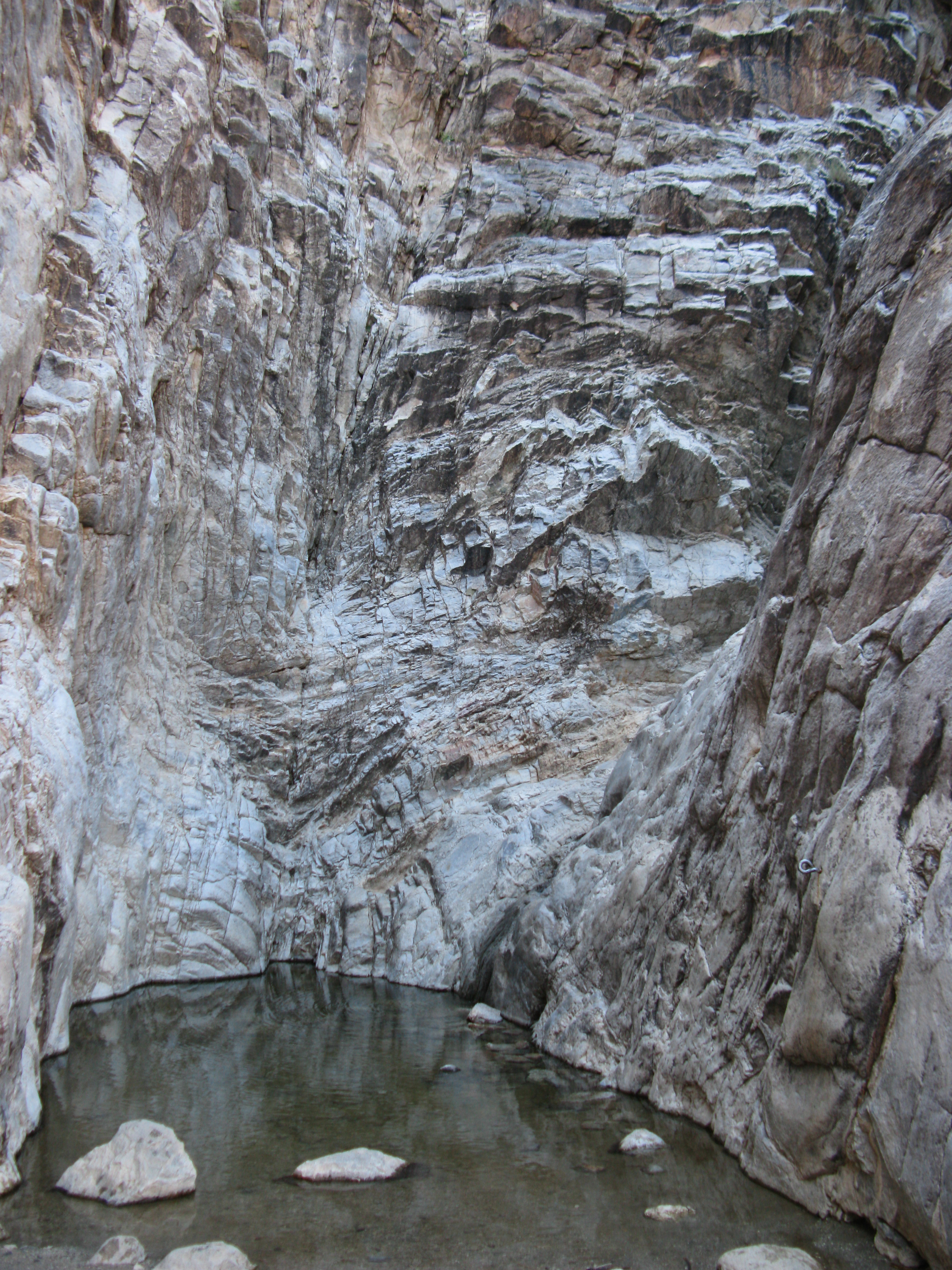
Granite "white tank" in the White Tank Mountains

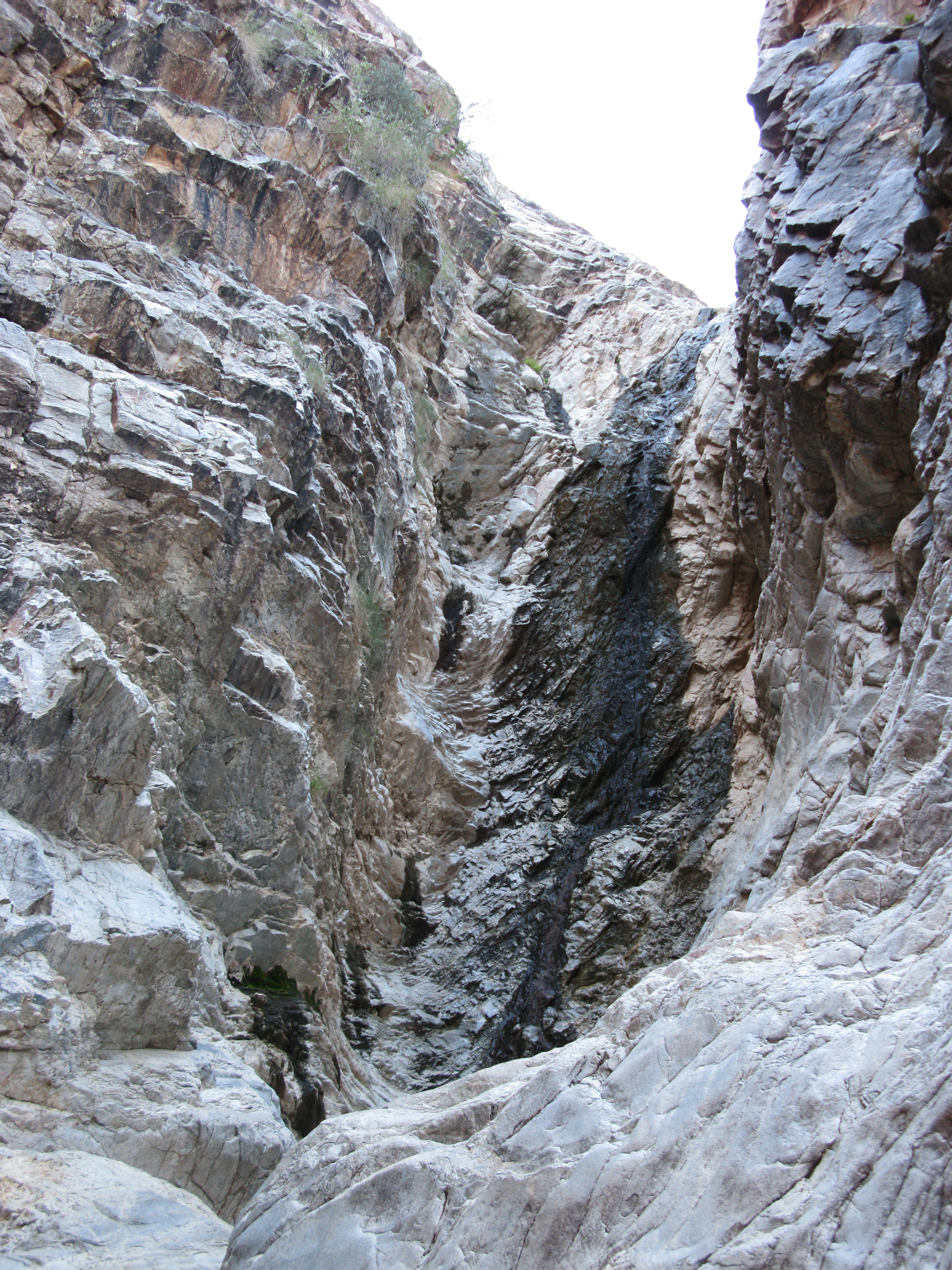
The White Tanks waterfall runs only immediately after rainfall

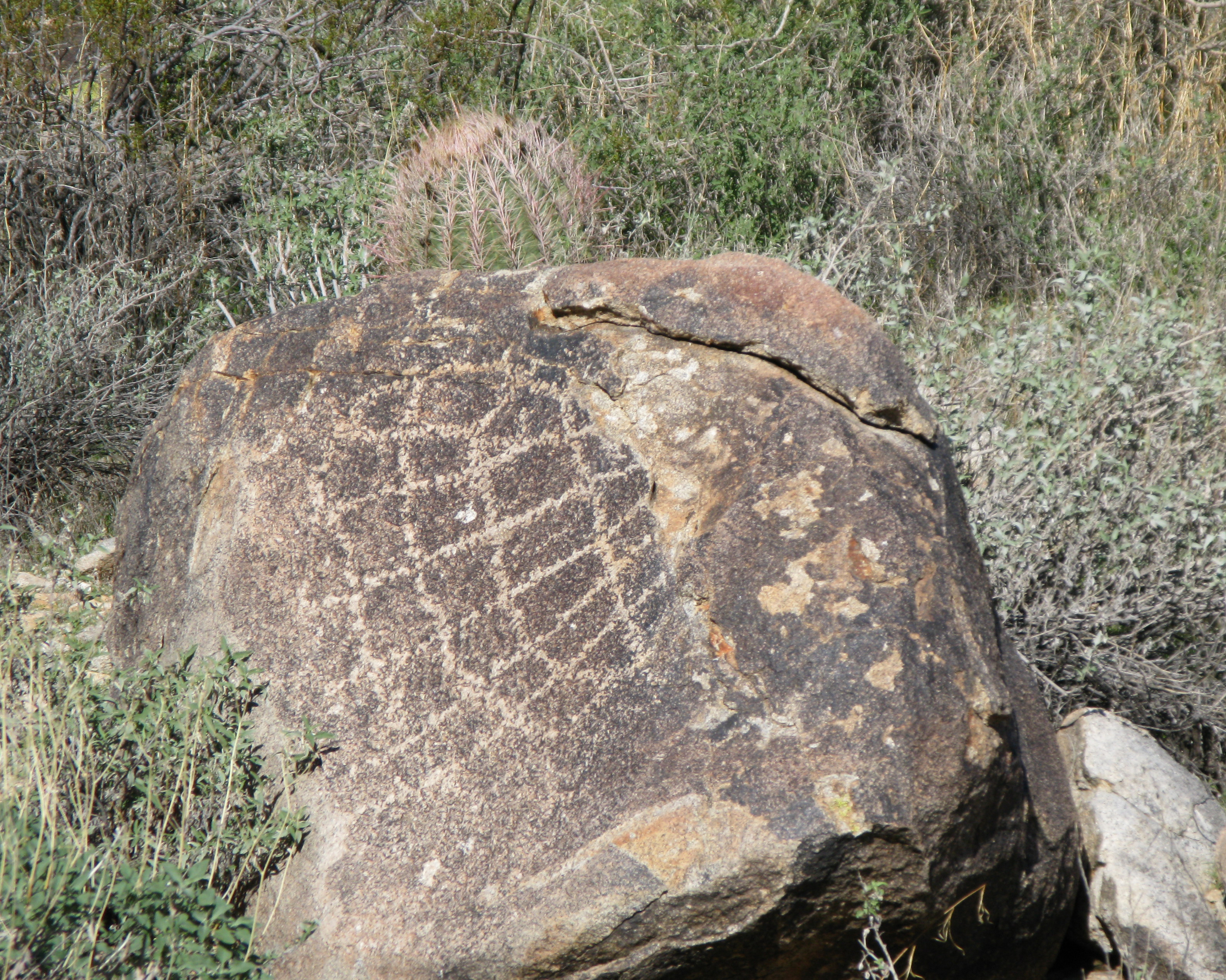
Web-like petroglyph on the White Tank Mountain Regional Park Waterfall Trail

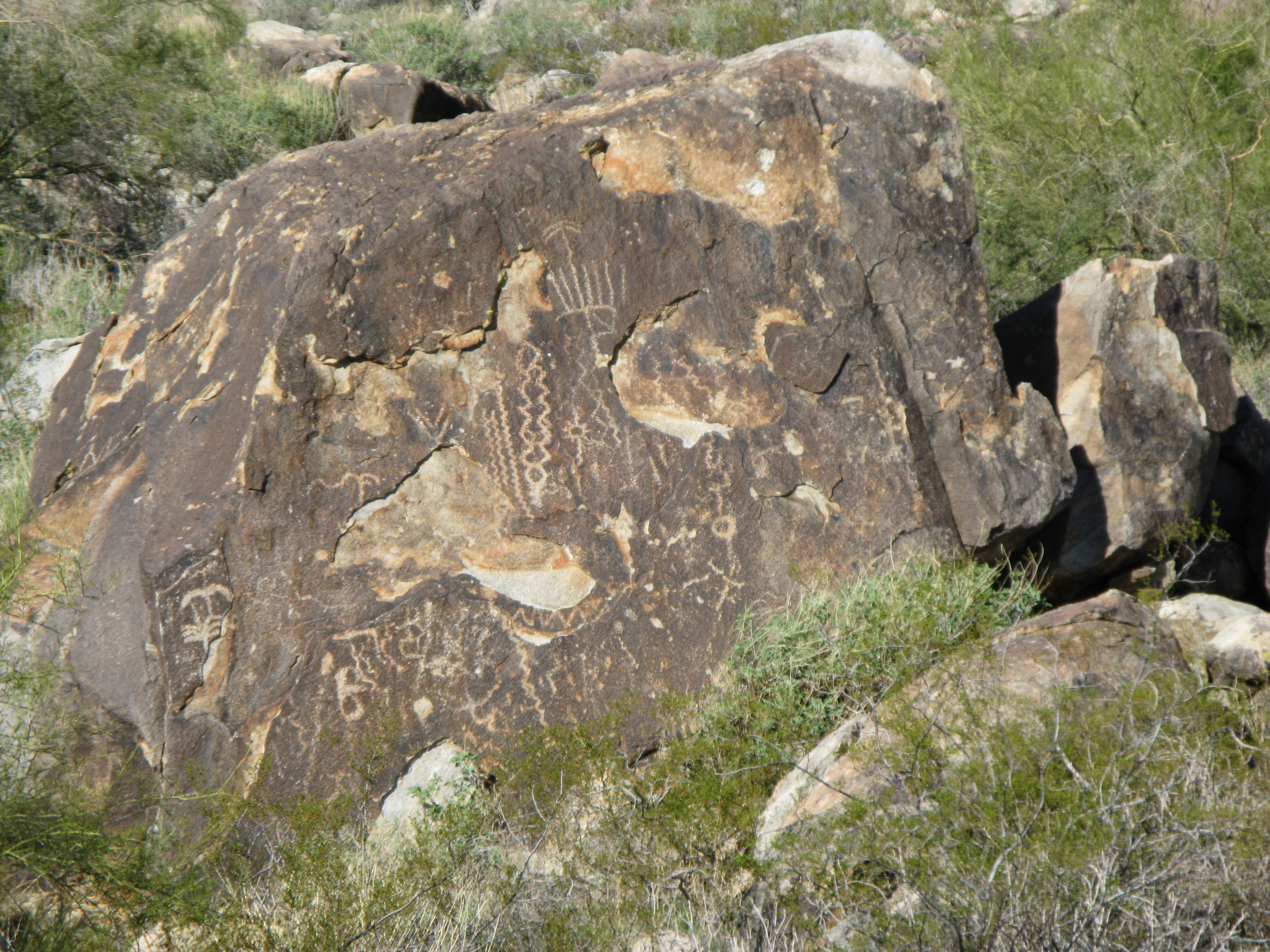
Chipping petroglyph on the White Tank Mountain Regional Park Waterfall Trail

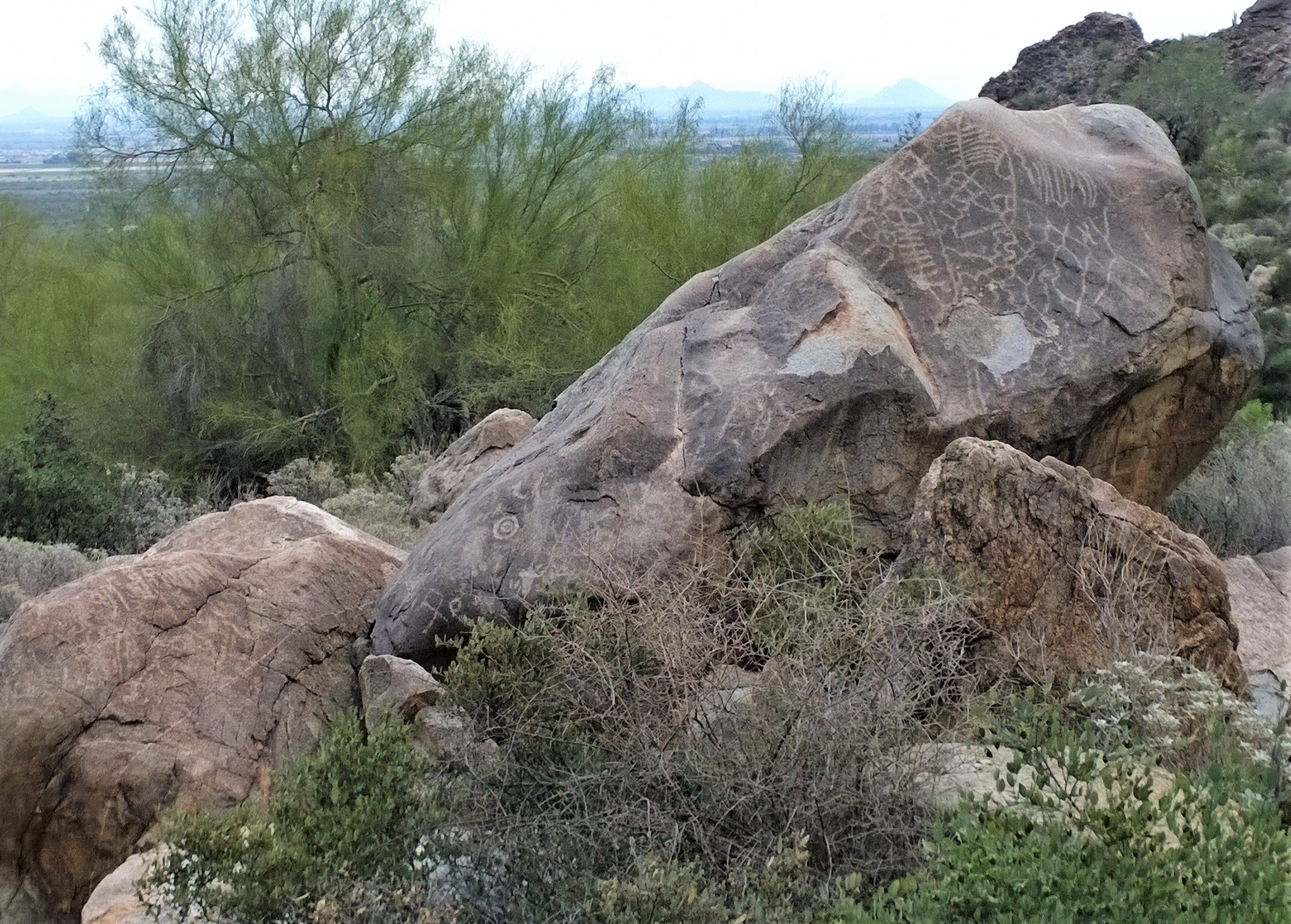
Petroglyph covered boulders
