= Youngker High School =

Secondary school in Buckeye, Arizona

Location
- 3000 S. Apache Road; Buckeye, Arizona 85326; United States; 33°25′9″N 112°34′34″W

Information
- School type: Public high school
- Established: August 2007
- School district: Buckeye Union High School District
- Principal: Michael Sivertson
- Teaching staff: 85.17 (FTE)
- Grades: 9-12
- Enrollment: 2,100 (2023-2024)
- Student to teacher ratio: 24.66
- Color
- Mascot: Rough Riders
- Nickname: Riders
- Website: yhs.buhsd.org/o/yhs

Youngker High School (YHS) is a high school in Buckeye, Arizona under the jurisdiction of the Buckeye Union High School District. It opened its doors for the first freshman class in 2007. The school opened under the guidance of Principal Johnny Ray, who retired from education in May 2009.

The district named the school after the Youngker family, who donated the land that the high school sits upon.

Its roof sustained damage in the 2011 Phoenix dust storm, causing water damage to several classrooms. Debris shattered two windows.

To accommodate unexpected growth, a former practice gym was converted into 12 classrooms for the 2022–23 school year.
