= Liberty Elementary School District =

School district in Arizona, United States

Address
- 19871 West Fremont Road Buckeye, Arizona, 85326; United States

District information
- Type: Public
- Grades: PreK – 8
- NCES District ID: 0404320

Students and staff
- Students: 3,698
- Teachers: 204.5
- Staff: 157.78
- Student–teacher ratio: 18.08

Other information
- Website: www.liberty25.org

Liberty Elementary School District 25 is a school district in Maricopa County, Arizona. It serves Liberty, Rainbow Valley, and parts of Buckeye and Goodyear. The schools in this district includes Liberty Elementary School, Rainbow Valley Elementary School, Westar Elementary School, Las Brisas Academy, Freedom Elementary School, Estrella Mountain Elementary School, and Blue Horizons Elementary School. All schools each have their own website and the school district has its own website. Each school in the Liberty district has a L.E.A.P Program. The L.E.A.P Program is an Extended Day Program that provides a before and after school environment. During L.E.A.P, students are able to communicate and play with fellow students, eat, exercise, draw, do schoolwork, and much more. Services are available for children ages 5–14 or students enrolled from kindergarten to eighth grade.
