= Litchfield Elementary School District =

School district in Maricopa County, Arizona

The Litchfield Elementary School District is an elementary school district in Litchfield Park, Arizona and surrounding areas. It was founded in 1915. It has 11 elementary schools, 2 of which are Preschool through 8th Grade and 4 middle schools. It has been serving the area for more than 90 years.

The district includes Litchfield Park, Citrus Park, and sections of Avondale, Buckeye, and Goodyear.

== Elementary schools ==
- Barbara B. Robey Elementary School
- Belen Soto Elementary School (PK-8)
- Corte Sierra Elementary School
- Dreaming Summit Elementary School
- Litchfield Elementary School
- Mabel Padgett Elementary School
- Palm Valley Elementary School
- Rancho Santa Fe Elementary School
- Scott Libby Elementary School
- Troy Gilbert Elementary School (K-8)
- Verrado Elementary School
- Verrado Heritage Elementary School (PK-8)
- White Tanks Learning Center (PK-8)

== Middle schools ==
- L. Thomas Heck Middle School
- Verrado Middle School
- Western Sky Middle School
- Wigwam Creek Middle School
