= Buckeye Municipal Airport =

Airport in Maricopa County, Arizona

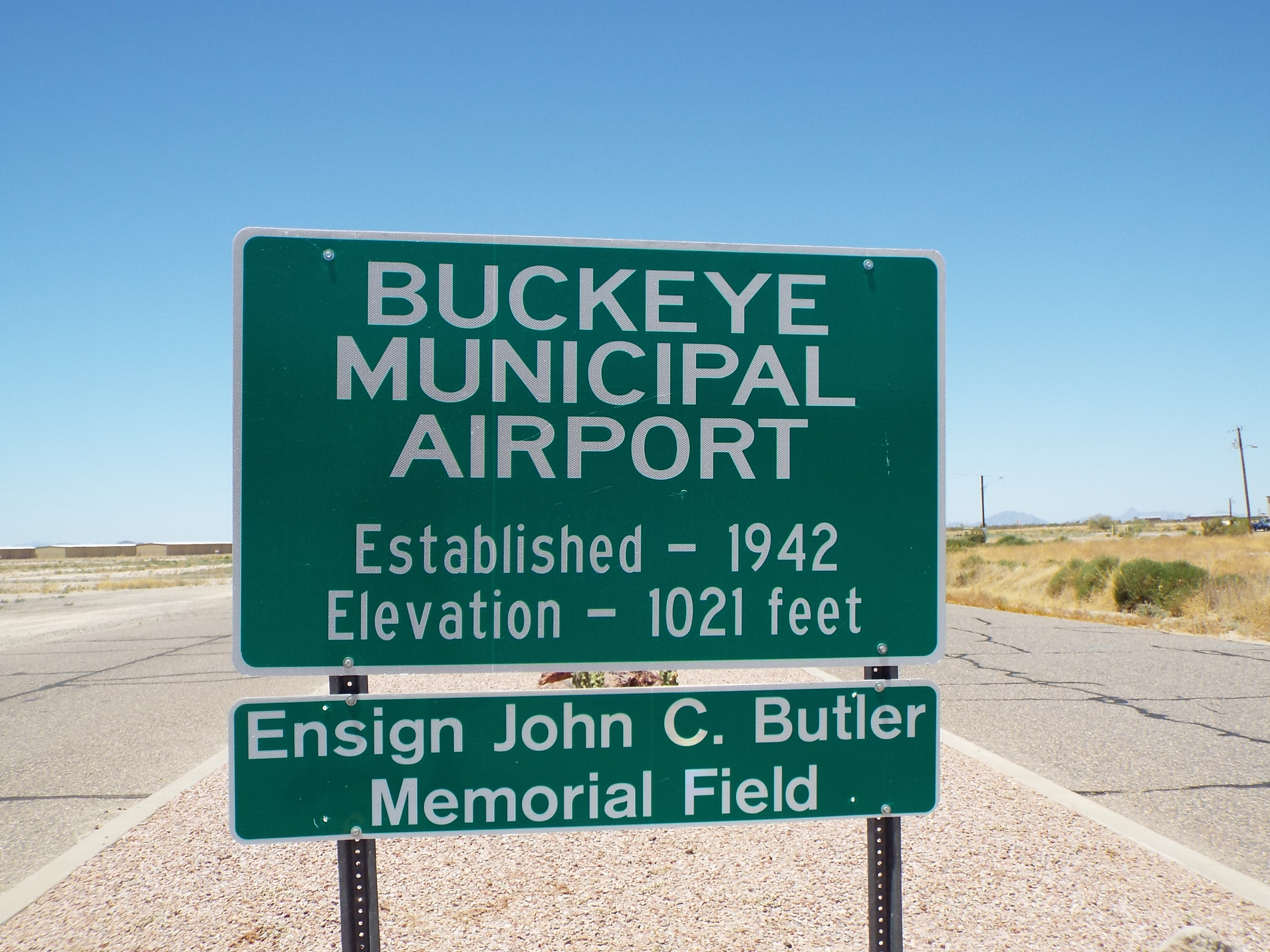
- IATA: BXK; ICAO: KBXK; FAA LID: BXK

Summary
- Airport type: Public
- Owner: City of Buckeye
- Serves: Buckeye, Arizona
- Elevation AMSL: 1,033 ft (315 m)
- Coordinates: 33°25′14″N 112°41′10″W
- Website: Buckeye Airport

Map
- Location within Arizona

Runways
Direction	Length		Surface
Direction	ft	m	Surface
17/35	5,500	1,676	Asphalt

Statistics (2010)
- Aircraft operations: 52,920
- Based aircraft: 53
- Source: Federal Aviation Administration

Buckeye Municipal Airport (IATA: BXK, ICAO: KBXK, FAA LID: BXK) is a city-owned public-use airport located 7 miles (6.1 nmi; 11 km) northwest of the central business district of Buckeye, a city in Maricopa County, Arizona, United States. The airport is included in the FAA's National Plan of Integrated Airport Systems for 2009–2013, which categorizes it as a general aviation facility. It is not served by any commercial airlines at this time.

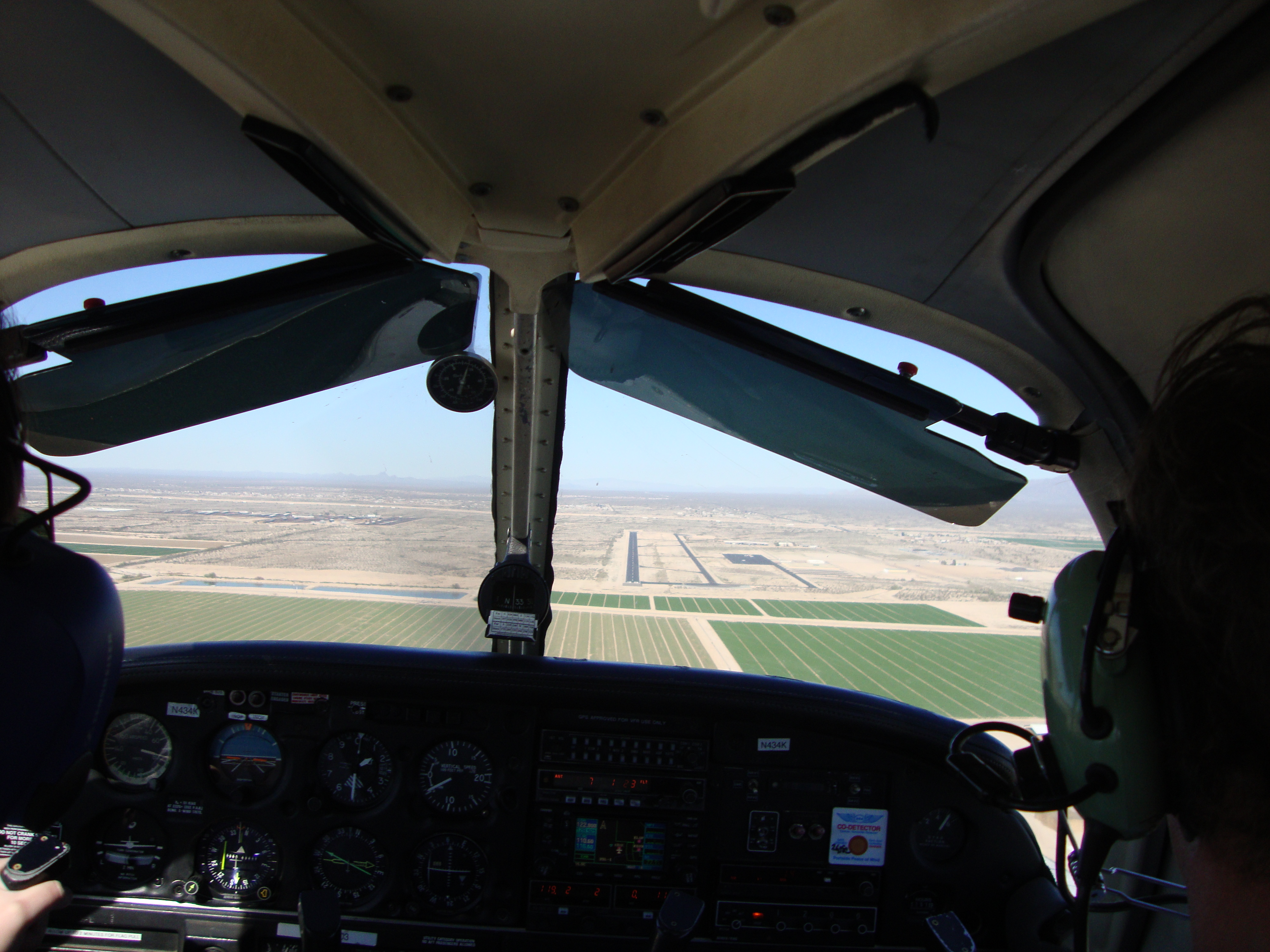
PA 28-161 of Oxford Aviation Academy, a British flight academy based at Phoenix Goodyear Airport, approaching Buckeye Municipal Airport, during student pilot training under JAA/CAA license

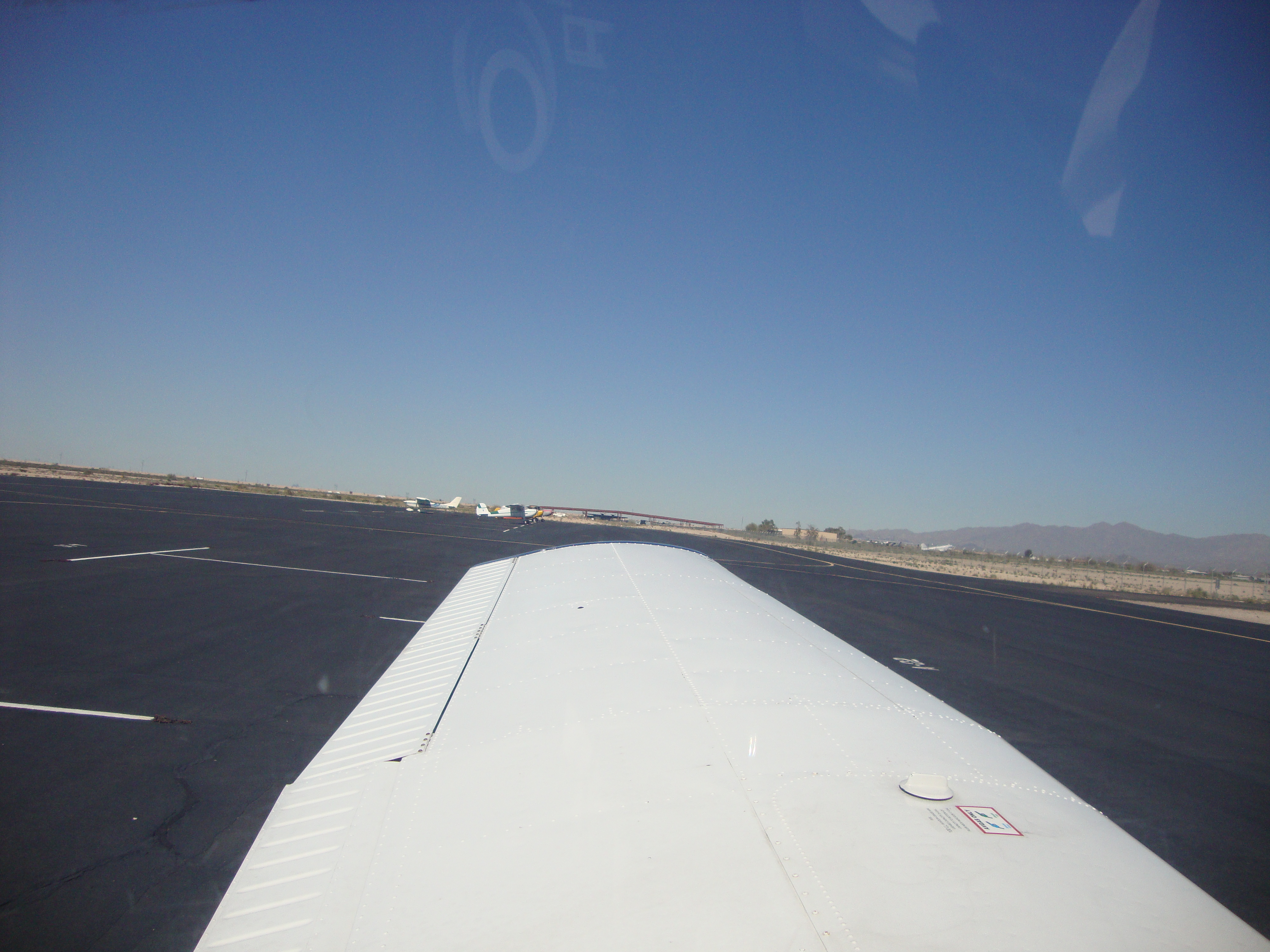
Buckeye Municipal Airport apron

== Facilities and aircraft ==
Buckeye Municipal Airport covers an area of 706 acres (286 ha) at an elevation of 1,033 feet (315 m) above mean sea level. It has one runway designated 17/35 with an asphalt surface measuring 5,500 by 75 ft (1,676 by 23 m).

For the 12-month period ending April 22, 2009, the airport had 52,920 aircraft operations, an average of 144 per day: 99.8% general aviation, 0.2% military and <0.1% air taxi. At that time there were 44 aircraft based at this airport: 75% single-engine, 5% multi-engine, 9% helicopter and 11% ultralight.

== History ==
The field was originally an auxiliary airfield for Luke Air Force Base built during World War II. After the war it was obtained by the Town of Buckeye (now City of Buckeye) for use as a civilian airport.

== See also ==
- List of airports in Arizona
