= Palo Verde Elementary School District =

School district in Arizona, United States

Palo Verde School District 49

Location
- PO Box 108; Palo Verde, Arizona 85343 United States

Other information
- Website: www.pvesd.org

Palo Verde School District 49 is a public school district based in Maricopa County, Arizona. It serves the community of Palo Verde, Arizona.
