= Estrella Foothills High School =

Public school in Arizona, United States

Location
- 13033 South Estrella Parkway; Goodyear, Arizona 85338; United States; 33°19′41″N 112°25′23″W

Information
- Type: Public secondary (U.S.)
- Established: 2001
- School district: Buckeye Union High School District
- Principal: Kim Heinz
- Staff: 61.00 (FTE)
- Grades: 9–12
- Enrollment: 1,461 (2023-2024)
- Student to teacher ratio: 23.95
- Colors: Columbia blue, black, silver
- Mascot: Wolf
- Website: efhs.buhsd.org

Estrella Foothills High School is a comprehensive high school campus located in Goodyear, Arizona. Estrella Foothills High School is a part of the Buckeye Union High School District. The school mascot is the wolf. There are approximately 1,160 students currently enrolled.

== Overview ==
Estrella Foothills High School opened its doors in August 2001. Opening with a freshman class of 110 students, the first graduating class of approximately 160 students received their diplomas in May 2005. From 2008 to 2011, EFHS maintained "Excelling" status, at the time the highest rank awarded to Arizona's public schools. Estrella Foothills high school is currently ranked ‘A’ by the Arizona Department of Education.

=== Academics ===
Estrella Foothills offers a wide range of academic classes (offered in block scheduling), including honors and AP courses, as well as many diverse electives including culinary arts, sports medicine, medical assisting, carpentry, education professions, band and choir, theatre and technical theatre, business, computer science, engineering, forensic science, dance, graphic design, creative writing, psychology, criminal law/sociology, and art. The school's CTE courses are part of the joint technological education district West-MEC.

Estrella Foothills offers extracurricular activities such as Career and Technical Student Organizations, National Honor Society, Drama Club and Thespians, Art Club, Dance Club, Newspaper, Interact, SHPE (including a robotics team), The Pythagorean Society, Earth Club, and many more.

Estrella Foothills offers a winter indoor percussion group, which competes in the WGAZ circuit. They were the first indoor percussion group in Buckeye Union High School District history to place first in their division at the WGAZ 2025 Championships.

Students at Estrella Foothills are encouraged to be well-rounded and volunteer in community and charitable events. Among these, the Drama Club and SkillsUSA chapter sponsors four blood drives through Vitalant each year. Interact Club regularly visits local charities and organizes drives for food and clothing. The student council organizes school and community events such as the annual Homecoming Carnival and Parade, Prom, and pep assemblies.

In athletics, Estrella Foothills is a member of the 4A Conference of the Arizona Interscholastic Association. The Wolves have distinguished themselves in their twelve years of varsity programs, having sent most of their teams to state playoff competitions at some point. Their first state championships came in track and field. The school has also celebrated state championships in spiritline, girls soccer, softball, girls track, tennis, and boys basketball teams.

== Notable alumni ==
- Corey Hawkins (class of 2010) – semi-professional basketball player and son of NBA All-Star, Hersey Hawkins
