= Tolleson Union High School District =

Union high school district in Tolleson, Arizona

Coordinates: 33.4499094°N 112.2693124°W

Tolleson Union High School District #214

Location
- 9801 West Van Buren Street, Tolleson, Arizona 85353

District information
- Type: Public/Private

Other information
- Website: http://www.tuhsd.org/

The Tolleson Union High School District is a high school district in the city of Tolleson, Arizona. Portions of Glendale, far west Phoenix and the historic Cashion area of Avondale are zoned into this district. The Tolleson Elementary School District, Fowler Elementary School District, Union Elementary School District, Littleton Elementary School District, and Pendergast Elementary School District are feeder districts for TUHSD.

== Schools ==
High schools in Tolleson Union High School District
School	Tolleson	Westview	La Joya	Copper Canyon	Sierra Linda	West Point
Location	Tolleson	Avondale	Avondale	Glendale	Phoenix	Avondale
Year opened	1927	1989	2002	2004	2008	2019
School colors	Maroon, Gold	Blue, Silver	Navy Blue, Vegas Gold	Black, Teal, Copper, White	Red, Blue, White	Red, Black
School mascot	Wolverine	Knights	Fighting Lobos	Aztecs	Bulldogs	Dragons
