= Avondale, Arizona =

City in Arizona, United States

- City
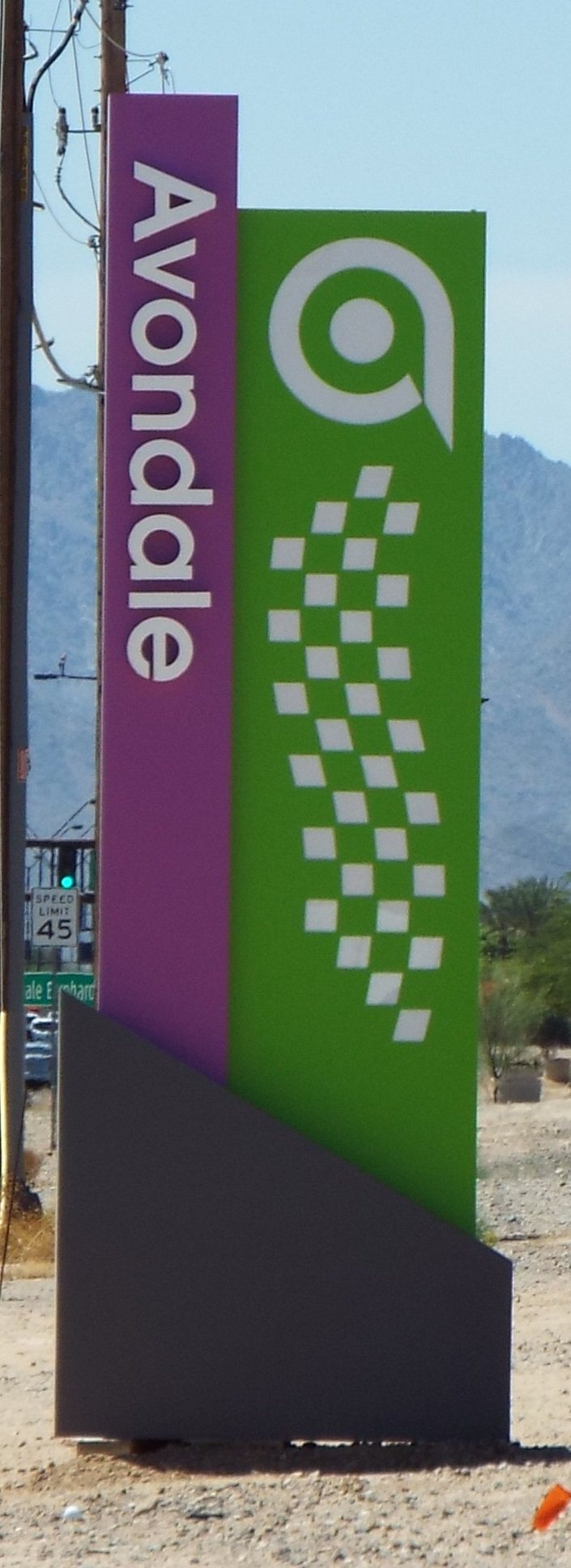
- Entrance sign

- Flag

- Location in Maricopa County, Arizona
- Coordinates: 33°26′01″N 112°20′59″W
- Country: United States
- State: Arizona
- County: Maricopa

Government
  - Mayor: Mike Pineda

Area
  - Total: 47.87 sq mi (123.99 km^{2})
  - Land: 47.62 sq mi (123.33 km^{2})
  - Water: 0.26 sq mi (0.67 km^{2})
- Elevation: 974 ft (297 m)

Population (2020)
  - Total: 89,334
  - Density: 1,876.1/sq mi (724.38/km^{2})
- Time zone: UTC-7 (MST (no daylight saving time))
- ZIP codes: 85323, 85392
- Area code: 623
- FIPS code: 04-04720
- GNIS feature ID: 2409765
- Website: avondaleaz.gov

Avondale is a city in Maricopa County, Arizona, United States, adjacent to Phoenix. As of the 2020 census, the population of the city was 89,334, up from 76,238 in 2010 and 35,883 in 2000.

Avondale, incorporated in 1946, has experienced rapid residential and commercial growth in the years since 1980. Once primarily a sparsely populated farming community with many acres of alfalfa and cotton fields, Avondale has transformed into a major bedroom suburb for Phoenix.

== History ==
William "Billy" G. Moore arrived in Arizona in the late 1860s, settling near the Agua Fria River in 1880. Moore called bought land and named his settlement "Coldwater, Arizona" - apparently for both the river and the water that flowed from a local spring. He served a brief stint as justice of the peace for the Agua Fria area. He eventually established a stage stop near Agua Fria crossing, the Coldwater Stage Station in the 1880s. This was one of the earliest stage stations in the region, supplying travelers with provisions on their way from Tucson to northern Arizona and California. A saloon and a general store were also built, bringing in more commerce for the settlement.

The post office was established in 1896 at a site near Avondale Ranch. From 1901 until 1905, William Moore served as postmaster of the Coldwater post office. The post office eventually became known as Avondale, taking the name of the nearby ranch, and the name Coldwater was discontinued. In December 1946, the City of Avondale was incorporated.

Subsequent development resulted in a conglomeration of styles and architecture along Western Avenue typical of small western towns, with ranching, the railroad, and cotton farming as the main industries. Recently, the city has seen tremendous growth in new development, both residential and commercial, while the Old Town area along Western Avenue preserves the historic business district and safeguards opportunities for small, independent businesses. The residential population is on track to exceed 100,000 by 2030.

Avondale is a modern city, near the heart of the Phoenix metropolitan area. Over the last decade, population growth took place at a rate of over 114%, making the city one of the fastest-growing in Maricopa County.

== Geography ==
Avondale is located at 33°26′01″N 112°20′59″W (33.435322, −112.349758). It is bordered to the west by Goodyear, to the north by Litchfield Park, and to the east by Phoenix and Tolleson.

According to the United States Census Bureau, the city has a total area of 47.9 square miles (124 km^{2}), of which 0.3 square miles (0.78 km^{2}), or 0.54%, are water. The Gila River crosses the southern part of the city, joined from the north by the Agua Fria River.

Interstate 10 crosses the northern part of Avondale, with access from exits 129 through 133A. The freeway leads east 15 miles (24 km) to Downtown Phoenix and west 134 miles (216 km) to Blythe, California.

=== Climate ===
Avondale has a large amount of sunshine year-round due to its stable descending air and high pressure. According to the Köppen Climate Classification system, the city has a Hot desert climate, abbreviated "BWh" on climate maps.

Winters are sunny and mild with nighttime lows averaging between 40 °F (4 °C) and 50 °F (4 °C and 10 °C) and daytime highs ranging from 60 °F (16 °C) to 75 °F (16 °C to 24 °C). The record low temperature recorded in Avondale is 16 °F (−9 °C). Summers are extremely hot, with daily high temperatures at or above 100 °F (38 °C) for the entirety of June, July, and August, as well as many days in May and September. An occasional heat wave will spike temperatures over 115 °F (46 °C) briefly. Nighttime lows in the summer months average between 70 °F (21 °C) and 80 °F (21 °C and 27 °C), with an occasional overnight low above 80 °F (27 °C) not uncommon. Avondale's record high temperature stands at an impressive 125 °F (52 °C), a few degrees warmer than the record for Phoenix, and just 3 °F (−16 °C) shy of Arizona's state record of 128 °F (53 °C), recorded in Lake Havasu City on June 29, 1994.

Snow is rare in the area, occurring once every several years. Lows in the winter occasionally dip below freezing, which may damage some desert plants such as saguaros and other cacti. In the summer (mainly July, August, and early September), the North American Monsoon can hit the Phoenix area in the afternoon and evening (possibly continuing overnight), causing rain showers even from a sunny morning. Dust storms are occasional, mainly during the summer.

Climate data for Avondale, Arizona
Month	Jan	Feb	Mar	Apr	May	Jun	Jul	Aug	Sep	Oct	Nov	Dec	Year
Record high °F (°C)	89 (32)	93 (34)	100 (38)	105 (41)	115 (46)	125 (52)	125 (52)	120 (49)	116 (47)	109 (43)	98 (37)	89 (32)	125 (52)
Mean daily maximum °F (°C)	65 (18)	70 (21)	76 (24)	85 (29)	94 (34)	103 (39)	105 (41)	103 (39)	98 (37)	87 (31)	74 (23)	64 (18)	85 (30)
Mean daily minimum °F (°C)	42 (6)	45 (7)	50 (10)	56 (13)	64 (18)	72 (22)	79 (26)	79 (26)	72 (22)	59 (15)	48 (9)	41 (5)	59 (15)
Record low °F (°C)	16 (−9)	22 (−6)	22 (−6)	27 (−3)	36 (2)	49 (9)	57 (14)	50 (10)	44 (7)	31 (−1)	22 (−6)	20 (−7)	16 (−9)
Average precipitation inches (mm)	0.99 (25)	1.28 (33)	0.97 (25)	0.37 (9.4)	0.11 (2.8)	0.04 (1.0)	0.83 (21)	1.23 (31)	0.95 (24)	0.49 (12)	0.68 (17)	0.99 (25)	8.93 (227)
Source: The Weather Channel

=== Gila and Salt River Meridian ===
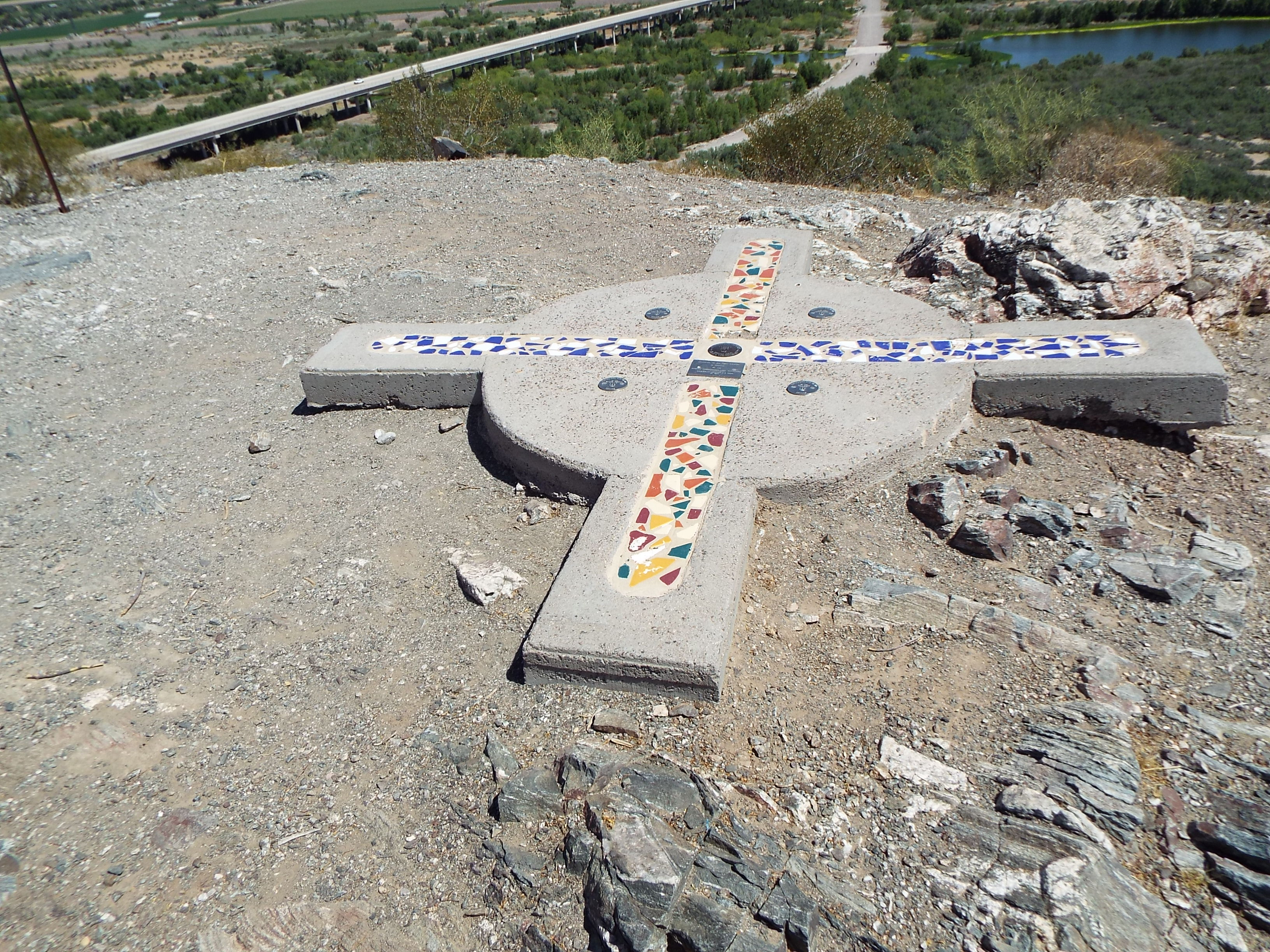
The initial point of the Gila and Salt River Meridan

The surveying marker of the Gila and Salt River Meridian is located on Monument Hill. Ever since 1851, this has been the center point used by the state to measure the land in Arizona. The federal government recognized this point for measuring the boundary between the United States and Mexico after the Mexican–American War ended. The first survey, conducted in 1867, involved the first 36 miles (58 km) of Arizona. Up until 1874, this was the epicenter of all surveying in Arizona for property deeds. It was listed in the National Register of Historic Places on October 15, 2002, Reference #02001137. Monument Hill is located at 115th Avenue and Baseline Road in Avondale.

== Demographics ==
Historical population
Census	Pop.	Note	%±
1920	517		—
1930	1,770		242.4%
1950	2,505		—
1960	6,151		145.5%
1970	6,626		7.7%
1980	8,168		23.3%
1990	16,169		98.0%
2000	35,883		121.9%
2010	76,238		112.5%
2020	89,334		17.2%
2025 (est.)	96,609	▲	8.1%
U.S. Decennial Census; Data Commons

=== Racial and ethnic composition ===
Avondale city, Arizona – racial and ethnic composition Note: the US Census treats Hispanic/Latino as an ethnic category. This table excludes Latinos from the racial categories and assigns them to a separate category. Hispanics/Latinos may be of any race.
Race / ethnicity (NH = Non-Hispanic)	Pop. 2000	Pop. 2010	Pop. 2020	% 2000	% 2010	% 2020
White alone (NH)	15,959	25,958	23,127	44.48%	34.05%	25.89%
Black or African American alone (NH)	1,748	6,643	8,272	4.87%	8.71%	9.26%
Native American or Alaska Native alone (NH)	245	746	991	0.68%	0.98%	1.11%
Asian alone (NH)	654	2,532	3,445	1.82%	3.32%	3.86%
Pacific Islander alone (NH)	38	208	339	0.11%	0.27%	0.38%
Some other race alone (NH)	39	173	550	0.11%	0.23%	0.62%
Mixed-race or multi-racial (NH)	611	1,638	2,932	1.70%	2.15%	3.28%
Hispanic or Latino (any race)	16,589	38,340	49,678	46.23%	50.29%	55.61%
Total	35,883	76,238	89,334	100.00%	100.00%	100.00%

=== 2020 census ===
As of the 2020 census, Avondale had a population of 89,334. The median age was 30.9 years. 29.4% of residents were under the age of 18 and 8.9% of residents were 65 years of age or older. For every 100 females there were 96.5 males, and for every 100 females age 18 and over there were 93.8 males age 18 and over.

99.1% of residents lived in urban areas, while 0.9% lived in rural areas.

There were 27,382 households in Avondale, of which 46.4% had children under the age of 18 living in them. Of all households, 48.7% were married-couple households, 17.4% were households with a male householder and no spouse or partner present, and 24.3% were households with a female householder and no spouse or partner present. About 15.7% of all households were made up of individuals and 4.2% had someone living alone who was 65 years of age or older.

There were 29,084 housing units, of which 5.9% were vacant. The homeowner vacancy rate was 1.0% and the rental vacancy rate was 8.3%.

Racial composition as of the 2020 census
Race	Number	Percent
White	33,720	37.7%
Black or African American	8,921	10.0%
American Indian and Alaska Native	1,918	2.1%
Asian	3,629	4.1%
Native Hawaiian and Other Pacific Islander	373	0.4%
Some other race	22,916	25.7%
Two or more races	17,857	20.0%
Hispanic or Latino (of any race)	49,678	55.6%

Avondale first appeared on the 1920 U.S. Census as the 45th Precinct of Maricopa County (AKA Coldwater). In 1930, it simply appeared as the Coldwater Precinct. It was recorded as having a Spanish/Hispanic majority for that census (the census would not separately feature that racial demographic again until 1980). With the combination of all county precincts into three districts in 1940, it did not report on that census. In 1946, it was incorporated as the town of Avondale, and has appeared on every census since 1950. In 1959, it upgraded to a city.

=== 2000 census ===
As of the census of 2000, there were 35,883 people, 10,640 households, and 8,724 families residing in the city. The population density was 869.7 inhabitants per square mile (335.8/km^{2}). There were 11,419 housing units at an average density of 276.8 per square mile (106.9/km^{2}). The racial makeup of the city was 63.27% White, 5.20% Black or African American, 1.28% Native American, 1.89% Asian, 0.14% Pacific Islander, 24.32% from other races, and 3.89% from two or more races. 46.23% of the population were Hispanic or Latino of any race.

There were 10,640 households, out of which 47.9% had children under the age of 18 living with them, 62.9% were married couples living together, 12.7% had a female householder with no husband present, and 18.0% were non-families. 12.9% of all households were made up of individuals, and 3.1% had someone living alone who was 65 years of age. The average household size was 3.36 and the average family size was 3.66.

In the city, the population was spread out, with 34.2% under the age of 18, 9.7% from 18 to 24, 33.1% from 25 to 44, 17.7% from 45 to 64, and 5.3% who were 65 years of age or older. The median age was 29 years. For every 100 females, there were 102.4 males. For every 100 females age 18 and over, there were 101.1 males.

The median income for a household in the city was $49,153, and the median income for a family was $51,084. Males had a median income of $35,134 versus $27,487 for females. The per capita income for the city was $16,919. About 10.3% of families and 13.8% of the population were below the poverty line, including 17.2% of those under age 18 and 16.7% of those age 65 or over.

== Economy ==
Top employers in Avondale as of 2023.

#	Employer	# of employees
1	Amazon	1,030
2	Maricopa County Community College District	830
3	City of Avondale	770
4	Tolleson Union High School District	560
5	Fry's Food and Drug	470
6	Avondale Elementary School District	460
7	Akos	400
8	Costco	390
9	Littleton Elementary School District	380
10	Walmart	370

== Sports ==
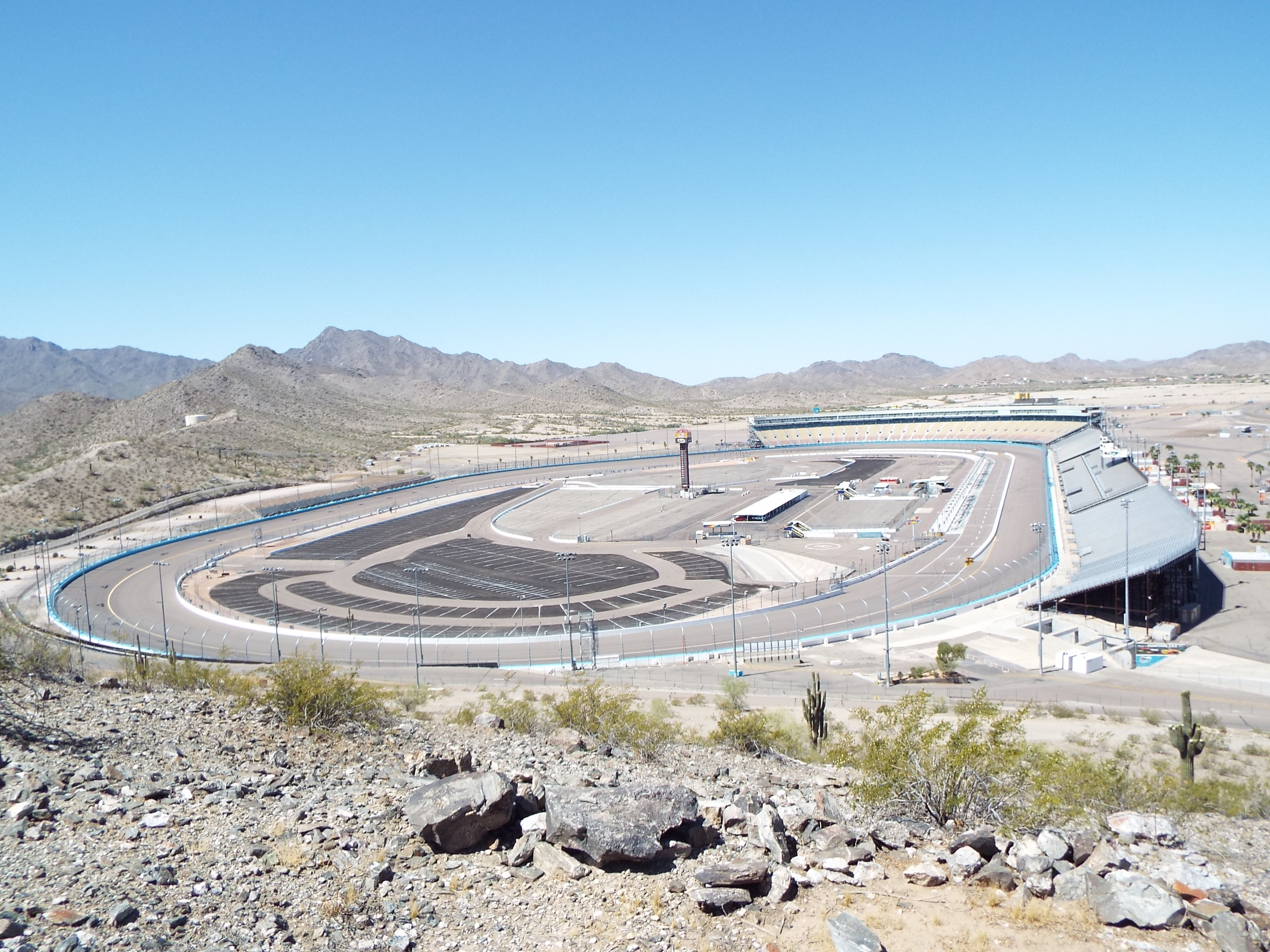
The Phoenix Raceway as viewed from the summit of Monument Hill

Avondale is home to Phoenix Raceway, a mile oval racetrack opened in 1964. It currently holds two NASCAR Cup Series races, two O'Reilly Series races, a NASCAR Craftsman Truck Series race, an IndyCar race, an ARCA Menards Series race, and an ARCA Menards Series West race annually. From 2020 to 2025, Phoenix Raceway served as host of the annual NASCAR championship race each November.

Avondale Parks and Recreation Department offers sports for both youth and adults.

== Parks ==
City parks:

- Alamar Park, 4155 S El Mirage Rd
- Las Ligas, 12421 W Lower Buckeye Road
- Festival Fields, 101 E. Lower Buckeye
- Donnie Hale Park, 10857 West Pima St.
- Friendship Park / Dog Park, 12325 West McDowell
- Mountain View, 201 E Mountain View Drive
- Sernas Plaza Park, 521 E Western Ave
- Fred Campbell Park, 101 E Lawrence Blvd
- Dennis DeConcini, 351 E Western Ave
- Dessie Lorenz Park, 202 E Main St
- Doc Rhodes Park, 104 W Western Ave

== Government ==
Avondale falls within Arizona's 7th Congressional District, which is currently represented by Adelita Grijalva. In the state legislature, Avondale falls under Arizona's 22nd State Legislative District, served by Representatives Lorenzo Sierra and Diego Espinoza and Senator Lupe Contreras, all Democrats.

=== Mayors ===
- Troy G. Fincher, ca. 1949
- Russell H. Brinker, ca. 1959
- Laverne R. Turner, ca. 1963
- Thomas F. Morales Jr., ca. 1996
- Ronald J. Drake, ca. 2000–2005
- Marie Lopez Rogers, ca. 2006–2013
- Kenneth N. Weise, 2014–2024
- Mike Pineda, 2025–present

== Education ==
Avondale is served by the Littleton Elementary School District and Tolleson Union High School District (east of the Agua Fria River) and the Avondale Elementary School District, and the Agua Fria Union High School District (west of the Agua Fria River). Within city boundaries are four public high schools—Agua Fria High School, La Joya Community High School, Westview High School and West Point High School.

Avondale also has several charter schools. Legacy Traditional School and Imagine Schools for elementary and middle school education, and Estrella High School and St. John Paul II Catholic High School.

Estrella Mountain Community College, established in 1992, is located in the city. Rio Salado College, a part of the Maricopa County Community College District, has a satellite building in Avondale. Universal Technical Institute and Empire Beauty Schools also have campuses in Avondale.

== Infrastructure ==
=== Transportation ===
Avondale is served by Valley Metro Bus. Avondale is also served by local routes 3 (Van Buren Street, 17 (McDowell Road), 41 (Indian School Road, express route 563 to Downtown Phoenix, and rural route 685 connecting Ajo and Phoenix. The Avondale Zoom service was discontinued and replaced with WeRIDE Microtransit Services.

=== Healthcare ===
The public hospital system, Valleywise Health (formerly Maricopa Integrated Health System), operates Valleywise Community Health Center – Avondale. Its sole hospital, Valleywise Health Medical Center, is in Phoenix.

Phoenix Children's Hospital has satellite facilities (Emergency Department - Avondale, and Sports Medicine PT - Avondale), at the corner of Avondale Boulevard and McDowell Road, and Avondale Boulevard and I-10 respectively.

== Notable people ==
- Michael P. Anderson, US Air Force officer and NASA astronaut, attended 3rd grade at Avondale Elementary School; the school was renamed in his honor
- Mitch Garcia, professional soccer player, graduated from Agua Fria High School
- Shawn Gilbert, professional baseball player; played high school baseball at Agua Fria High School
- Everson Griffen, defensive end for USC Trojans and Minnesota Vikings; attended Agua Fria High School
- Nick Harris, punter for NFL's Detroit Lions; attended Westview High School
- Drisan James, wide receiver for CFL's Hamilton Tiger-Cats; attended Westview High School
- Craig Mabbitt, vocalist for band Escape the Fate and former vocalist for bands Blessthefall and The Word Alive; attended Westview High School
- Randall McDaniel, former NFL offensive guard, inducted into National Football Foundation College Hall of Fame in 2008 and Pro Football Hall of Fame in 2009; was a sprinter at Agua Fria High School
- Clancy Pendergast, NFL and college coach
- Shelley Smith, former NFL player

== See also ==
- Goodyear Farms Historic Cemetery
- List of historic properties in Avondale, Arizona
