= Sierra Linda High School =

Location
- 3434 S. 67th Avenue; Phoenix, Arizona 85043; United States
- 33°25′1″N 112°12′23″W

Information
- School type: Public high school
- Motto: Dream, Believe, Strive, Achieve
- Established: 2008; 18 years ago
- School district: Tolleson Union High School District
- Principal: Randy Camacho
- Teaching staff: 87.80 (FTE)
- Grades: 9-12
- Enrollment: 1,860 (2023–2024)
- Student to teacher ratio: 21.18
- Color
- Mascot: Bulldog
- Website: http://sierralinda.tuhsd.org/

Sierra Linda High School is a high school located in the west part of Phoenix, Arizona, USA, administered by the Tolleson Union High School District. The school serves about 1,860 students as of the 2023–2024 school year. It opened in 2008; due to facility issues, students attended the first semester of classes at La Joya Community High School, then moved into the campus in January 2009. Students of the 2012 cohort were the first graduating class, with approximately 355 students. Valley Metro Bus's route 67 terminates outside of the school.
