= West Point High School =

West Point High School can refer to:

- West Point High School (Alabama) in Cullman, Alabama
- West Point High School (Arizona) in Tolleson, Arizona
- West Point High School (Mississippi) in West Point, Mississippi
- West Point High School (Nebraska) in West Point, Nebraska
- West Point High School (Virginia) in West Point, Virginia
