= Shelley Smith (American football) =

American football player (born 1987)

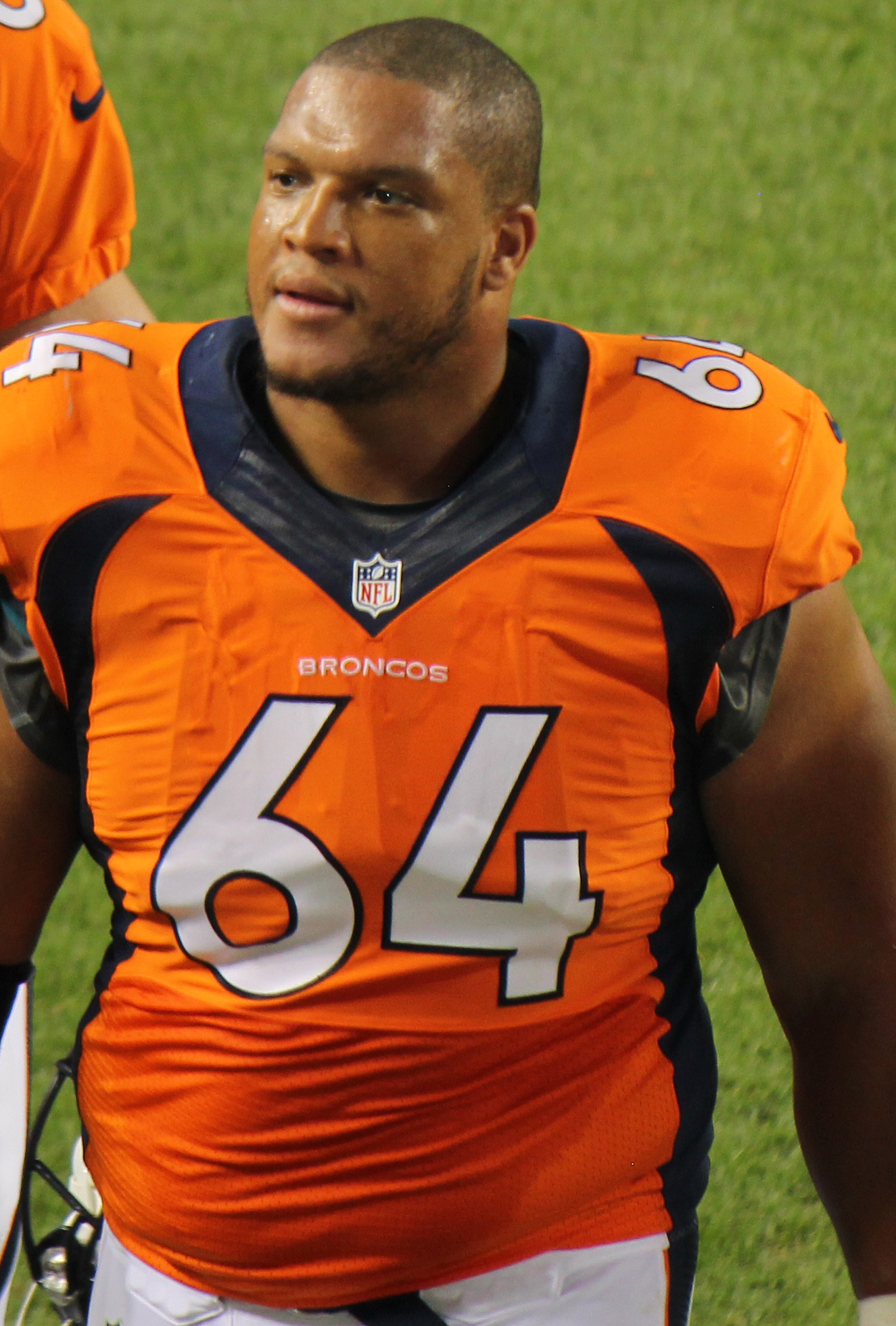
- Smith with the Denver Broncos in 2015

No. 66
- Position: Guard

Personal information
- Born: May 21, 1987 (age 39); Phoenix, Arizona, U.S.
- Listed height: 6 ft 4 in (1.93 m)
- Listed weight: 312 lb (142 kg)

Career information
- High school: Westview (Avondale, Arizona)
- College: Colorado State
- NFL draft: 2010: 6th round, 187th overall pick

Career history
- Houston Texans (2010–2011); St. Louis Rams (2012–2013); Miami Dolphins (2014); Denver Broncos (2015); Miami Dolphins (2015); Chicago Bears (2016)*
- * Offseason or practice squad member only

Awards and highlights
- Second-team All-MW (2008)

Career NFL statistics
- Games played: 36
- Games started: 11
- Stats at Pro Football Reference

Shelley Andres Smith (born May 21, 1987) is an American former professional football player who was a guard in the National Football League (NFL). He was selected by the Houston Texans in the sixth round of the 2010 NFL draft. He played college football for the Colorado State Rams.

== Professional career ==
=== Houston Texans ===
Smith was selected by the Houston Texans in the sixth round (187th pick overall) of the 2010 NFL draft. He was the highest drafted CSU Rams offensive lineman since Clint Oldenburg in 2007. On June 16, 2010, Smith signed a four-year deal with the Texans worth $1.894 million. On October 6, 2010, Smith was waived. The next day Smith was signed to the teams practice squad. On December 1, 2010, Smith was signed to the teams active roster. On August 29, 2011, Smith was placed on injured reserve with an ankle injury, ending his season. On September 1, 2012, Smith was waived.

=== St. Louis Rams ===
On September 3, 2012, Smith was claimed off waivers by the St. Louis Rams. On October 21, 2012, Smith made his first career start at left guard against the Green Bay Packers. In 2013 Smith played 371 offensive snaps.

=== Miami Dolphins (first stint) ===
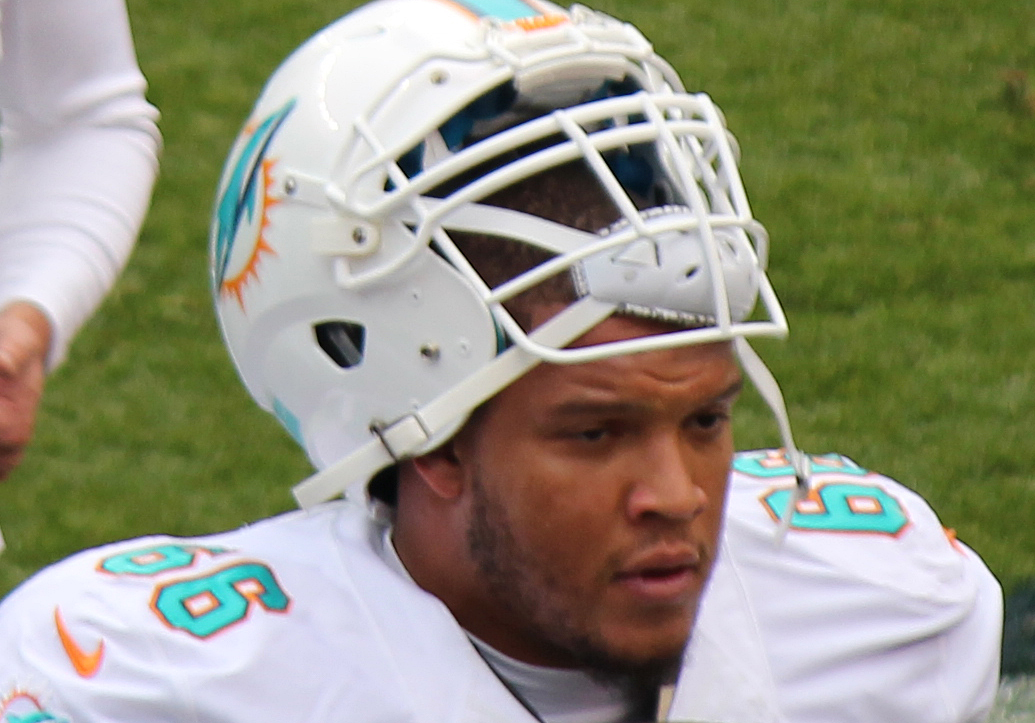
Smith with the Dolphins in 2014

After Smith's rookie contract expired, Smith signed with the Miami Dolphins on March 14, 2014. Smith rotated at many positions with the Dolphins. Smith had stints at right guard, left guard and center. He was released on March 10, 2015.

=== Denver Broncos ===
Smith signed a two-year contract with the Denver Broncos on March 13, 2015. On November 18, 2015, he was waived.

=== Miami Dolphins (second stint ) ===
On December 22, 2015, Smith re-signed with the Dolphins.
