= Copper Canyon High School =

Secondary school in Maricopa County, Arizona

Coordinates: 33°30′44″N 112°15′24″W

- 9126 W Camelback Rd; Glendale, Arizona 85305

Information
- School type: Public high school
- Motto: Seize Your Coppertunity
- Established: 2004
- School district: Tolleson Union High School District
- Principal: Bo Oxford
- Teaching staff: 99.80 (FTE)
- Grades: 9-12
- Enrollment: 2,155 (2023-2024)
- Student to teacher ratio: 21.59
- Color
- Team name: Aztecs
- Website: https://coppercanyon.tuhsd.org

Copper Canyon High School is a public high school located in Glendale, Arizona, United States; it is part of the Tolleson Union High School District. The school opened its doors in August 2004 and had its first graduating class in May 2008. Copper Canyon High School requires students to wear student IDs to identify them as students, and are used to access lunch accounts and conduct business in the bookstore or library. CCHS has a security staff of four members on campus to help students follow the rules, and to maintain safety on campus. CCHS holds graduation ceremonies at the State Farm Stadium, home of the Arizona Cardinals. CCHS is home to Alfred "Bo" Oxford, the highly acclaimed 2025 TUHSD Administrator of the Year.

== Stunt program ==
Copper Canyon has the largest coed stunt program in Arizona. Jason Mitchell currently (now in 2016 no longer is coach) coaches the stunt programs. Copper Canyon Coed Varsity placed 2nd at the AIA State Qualifiers, which was their first time competing at state. The team took 4th place at the AIA State Competition, they tied with 3rd, behind 2nd by one point, and four points away from first place. The coed varsity moved on to nationals. In March, the Coed Varsity took 5th place at nationals, earning the title as the #1 nationally ranked coed team in Arizona. Varsity Pom and All-Girl Varsity also qualified for nationals, but did not make the finals. For the 2014–2015 season, teams include Coed Varsity, Coed Junior Varsity, and Varsity Pom. It was announced that All-Girl Varsity will be removed for the next season. The cheer team is no longer the largest coed team.
