= West Point High School (Arizona) =

High school in Avondale, Arizona

Location
- 11620 W. Encanto Blvd. Avondale, Arizona 85392; United States
- 33°28′21″N 112°18′37″W

Information
- Type: Public
- Opened: July 31, 2019
- School district: Tolleson Union High School District
- Principal: Brandi Haskins
- Teaching staff: 123.60 (FTE)
- Grades: 9–12
- Enrollment: 2,877 (2023–2024)
- Student to teacher ratio: 23.28
- Colors: Red and black
- Mascot: Dragons
- Website: westpoint.tuhsd.org

West Point High School is a high school in Avondale, Arizona, the seventh public high school operated by the Tolleson Union High School District.

== History ==
On September 19, 2018, the Tolleson Union High School District broke ground on its seventh high school, with the intent to relieve overcrowding in the fast-growing district. Prior to the opening of West Point, the school district was turning away potential students; at its other high schools, it had pressed teachers' lounges into service as extra classrooms and put into place portable classroom structures to provide needed space. The name West Point and Dragons mascot were determined in consultation with parents, community members, and students.

The $108 million construction cost primarily came from $48 million from the Arizona School Facilities Board and $53 million from a 2016 voter-approved bond. Design of the 310,000-square-foot (29,000 m^{2}) school complex was conducted by ADM Group, with Chasse Building Team serving as the general contractor. Prominent in the school's design is a wing theme inspired by the school's proximity to Luke Air Force Base. The 11-building campus was designed around a "secure but open" plan, with strategically placed windows, one-way windows in the principal's office, and the ability to lock any door in the facility remotely. The grades are 9th though 12th

The district announced that Brandi Haskins, a 28-year district veteran who had been the principal of La Joya Community High School, would transfer to the new West Point in January 2019.

The first phase of the school opened to an estimated 1,200 freshmen and sophomores on July 31, 2019, with construction on a second phase of sports fields, a performing arts center, and classroom space currently underway to allow the school to open to juniors and seniors for the 2020–21 and 2021–22 school years, respectively.

== Curriculum ==
The primary academic feature of West Point High School is an academy (West Point Leadership Academy) in partnership with Luke Air Force Base, which is modeled after the school-within-a-school program at the district's University High School. The academy will feature a STEAM curriculum and emphasize leadership and community service.
