= Cashion, Arizona =

Neighborhood in Arizona, United States

Coordinates: 33.4°N 112.3°W

Cashion is a neighborhood and former unincorporated community in Avondale, Maricopa County, Arizona, United States. As of 2000, it had a population of 2,965. It is bounded in the north by Buckeye Rd., in the south by Durango St., on the west by 115th Ave., and on the east by 107th Ave.

Cashion ceased to be a census-designated place in 1990 due to its annexation, but its name continues to be associated with the 85329 zip code. The ZCTA for the Cashion zip code had a population of 2,438 in the 2020 United States Census.

== History ==
Historical population
Census	Pop.	Note	%±
1970	3,014		—
1980	2,705		−10.3%
2000	2,965		—

Cashion lies in the Salt River Valley just north of the confluence of the Salt and Gila rivers. During the first millennium, between 700 and 900 CE, the Hohokam people had a large settlement south of present-day Cashion. The settlement, known today as the Cashion Site or Cashion Ruin, was strategically located in proximity to regional trade routes, and had public facilities such as ball courts and platform mounds. It was served by an irrigation canal that carried water from the Salt River.

In the 1970s the Museum of Northern Arizona conducted excavations at the Cashion Site and removed 83 human remains as well as hundreds of funerary artifacts. In 2006 these remains and funeral goods were inventoried for return to a coalition of Native American tribes under NAGPRA.

In the late 19th century, Jim Cashion of the Cashion Ranch raised cattle in present-day Cashion and later farmed ostriches. After ostrich hats fell out of fashion the ostriches were sold and sent to Chandler. In 1911, he secured a commission for a fourth-class post office. As of 2024, the Cashion post office remains in operation.

In the 1920s Cashion was a regular stop on the Buckeye line of the Arizona Eastern Railway, between Phoenix and Hassayampa. Trains stopped daily to pick up and deliver mail.

A community called Littleton was established in the early 20th century by a dentist named S.D. Little. Littleton failed, but its name lives on in the Littleton Elementary School District, which operates schools in and around Cashion.

== People ==
Notable people from Cashion include state legislator Lito Peña (1924-2013), who was born there.
