= Westview High School (Arizona) =

Coordinates: 33°29′24″N 112°17′35″W

Location
- 10850 W. Garden Lakes Parkway; Avondale, Arizona 85392; United States

Information
- School type: Public high school
- Established: 1989
- School district: Tolleson Union High School District
- Principal: Natalie Quinonez
- Staff: 87.80 (FTE)
- Grades: 9-12
- Enrollment: 1,733 (2023–2024)
- Student to teacher ratio: 19.74
- Colors: Royal blue and silver
- Mascot: Knights

Westview High School is a suburban high school in Avondale, Arizona, United States. It opened in 1989 and its first graduating class was in June 1993.

It is the largest high school in the Tolleson Union High School District.

== Athletics ==
The varsity football team lost to Centennial High School for the state title for 5A in 2007 and 2008. In 2010, the football team advanced to the semi-finals of the state tournament. The varsity girls' soccer and girls' basketball teams finished state runners-up in 2006. Westview's sports teams have the mascot of the Knight, known as Sir West of View. Westview is very known for their Football, not missing the playoffs since 2005 and winning their division since 2010 under very good coaches who are now college coaches such as Jeff Bowen, Joe Parker.

== Notable alumni ==
- Errol Barnett, anchor and correspondent for CBS
- Nick Harris, punter for the Detroit Lions
- David Hernandez, singer, 12th place finalist of American Idol
- Drisan James, wide receiver for the Philadelphia Eagles
- Craig Mabbitt, former vocalist of bands Blessthefall and The Word Alive; current vocalist for Escape the Fate
- Andrae Thurman, wide receiver for the Green Bay Packers, Tennessee Titans and Dallas Desperados

== Notable staff and faculty ==
- George Martinez, coached Westview football from 2001 to 2005; went on to join the coaching staff for the Oakland Raiders
- Will "Salty" Thompson, international 400-meter runner for Northern Ireland from 1983 to 1986; selection to the Ulster provincial U-19 and Junior (U-23) teams; English and American rugby player
- Jeff Bowen, Led the Westview football team to back to back 5A titles in 2007, 2008
- Stephen Bower, Current head coach for the Westview soccer team, Bower played for Houghton college in Caneadea, New York
