= List of historic properties in Avondale, Arizona =

- Town
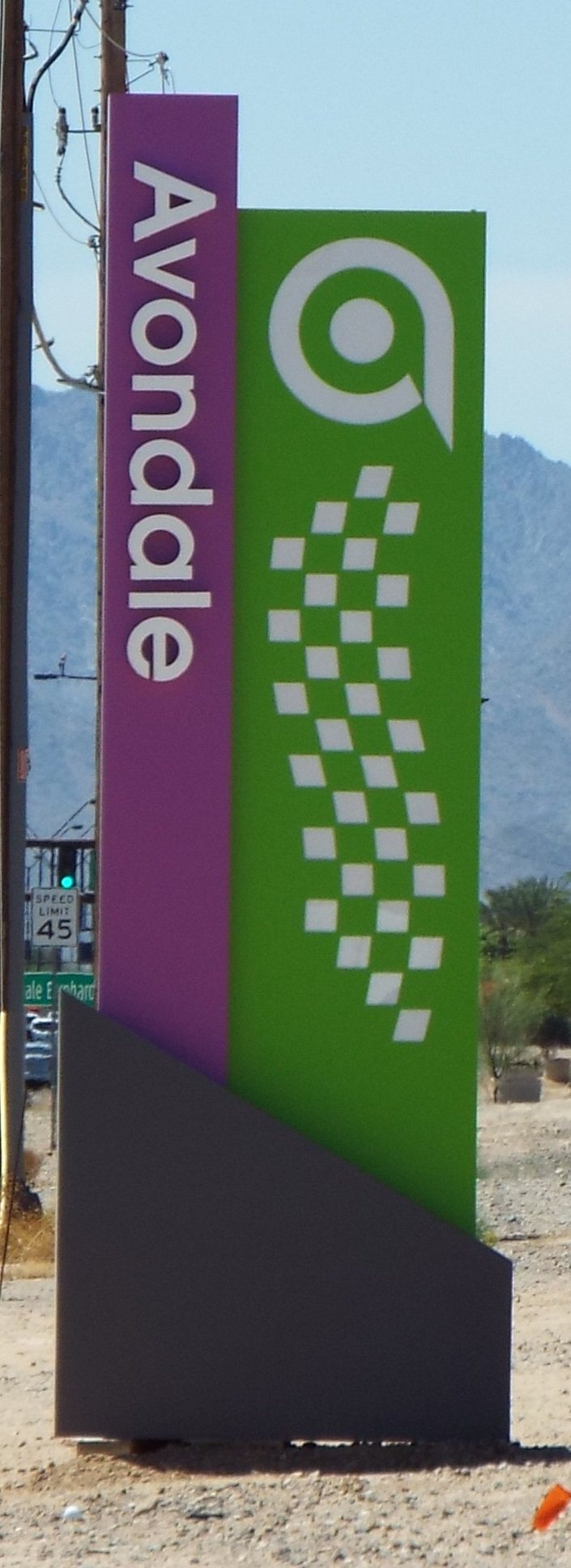
- Entrance to the town of Avondale

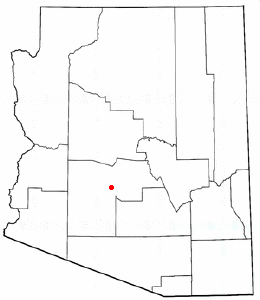
- Location of Avondale in Maricopa County, Arizona.

This is a list, which includes a photographic gallery, of some of the remaining structures and monuments, of historic significance in Avondale, a city in Maricopa County, Arizona, United States, adjacent to Phoenix, Arizona.Farming was the main industry in Avondale in the late 1890s. Avondale was incorporated in 1946.

== Brief history ==
The surveying marker of the Gila and Salt River Meridan is located on Monument Hill. Ever since 1851, this has been the center point used by the state to measure the land in Arizona. The federal government recognized this point for measuring the boundary between the United States and Mexico after the Mexican–American War ended. The first survey conducted in 1867, involved the first 36 miles of Arizona. Up until 1874, this was the epicenter of all surveying in Arizona for property deeds. It was listed in the National Register of Historic Places on October 15, 2002, reference #02001137. Monument Hill is located at 115th Ave. and Baseline Road in Avondale, Az.

In 1860, William G. Moore a.k.a. "Billy" moved to Arizona. He established a settlement in 1880, by the Agua Fria River (Cold Water River) area. He purchased some land there and built a stage station. The station served the travelers on their way from Tucson to northern Arizona and California. Moore also established a saloon and a general store. He named the area where his establishments were located "Coldwater, Arizona" and he served as the post master of "Coldwater" from 1901 till 1905.

Around 1905, the United States Postal service moved their office from Coldwater to a site near the Avondale Ranch. The post office was renamed Avondale Post Office. The area then became officially known as Avondale instead of Coldwater. In December 1946, the City of Avondale was incorporated.

== The Three Rivers Historical Society ==
The mission of the Three Rivers Historical Society is to preserve the history of the cities of Avondale, Goodyear, Litchfield Park and Tolleson.

== Properties pictured ==
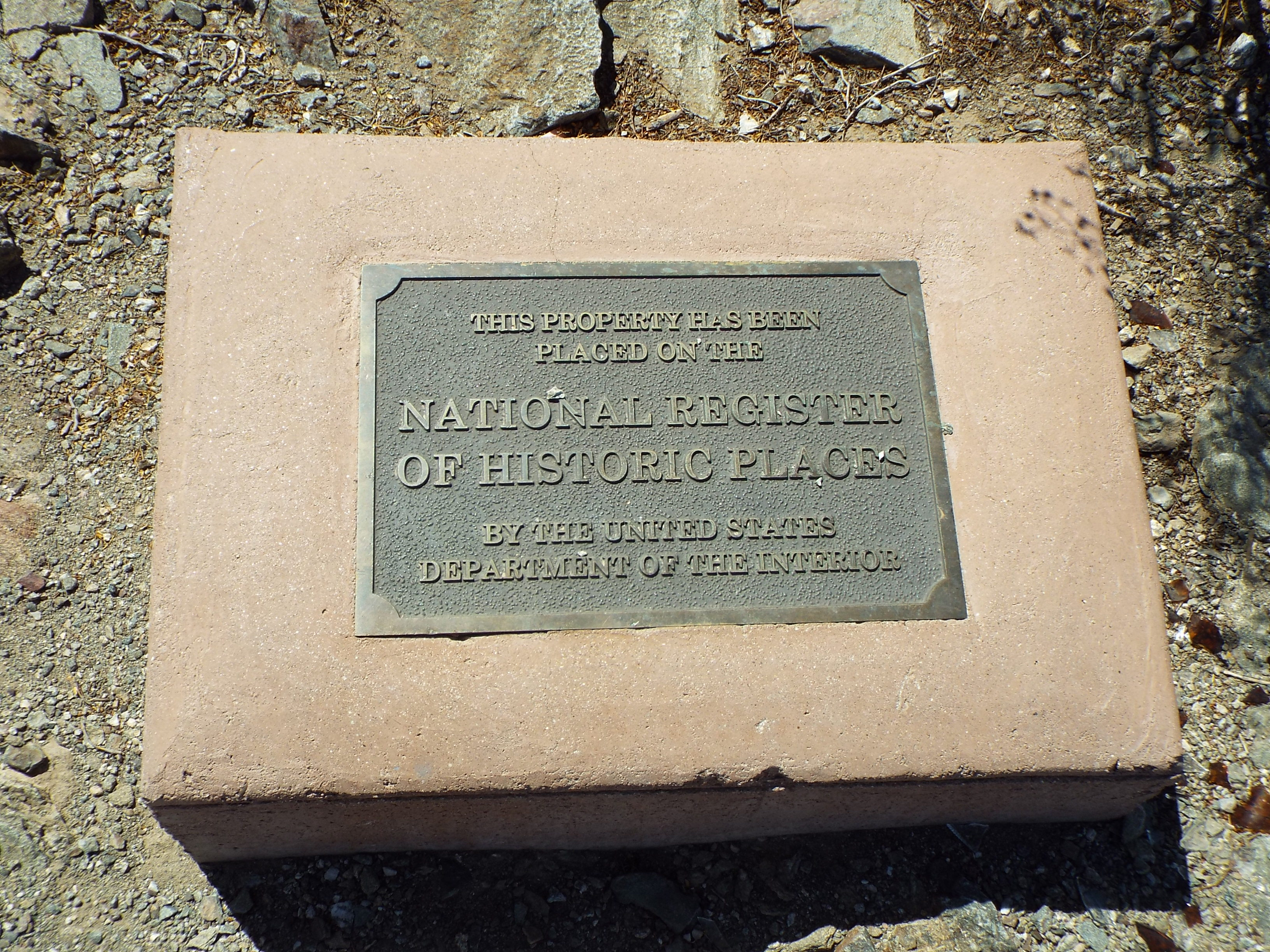
National Register of Historic Places marker on Monument Hill

The following is a brief description and images of the historic properties that are pictured.

- The surveying marker of the Gila and Salt River Meridan – The marker is located on Monument Hill.
- The Gila and Salt River Meridan Marker – The following is engraved on the round marker: U.S. Department of the Interior Bureau of Land Management. Initial Point of Establishment in 1865. Gila and Salt River Meridian, Arizona. Cadastral Survey. The rectangular marker states the following: Dedicated to all land owners in Arizona by the Arizona Professional Land Surveyors originally set by A. B. Gray in 1851.
- The historic Monument Hill- This is the hill where the initial point of the Gila and Salt River Meridan is located.
- The Gila River – The river as viewed from the summit of the historic Monument Hill.
- Commercial Building – built in 1925 and located at 203 N. Dysart Road, Avondale, AZ. It once served as a Salvation Army furniture store.
- The Union Pacific Railroad Bridge – built in 1926 and located alongside Buckeye Road in Avondale.
- Downtown Avondale – Historic Corridor in downtown Avondale as viewed from Western Ave.
- The White House – built in 1938 and located at 127 E Western Ave. It once housed the All Faith Community Outreach.
- The Avondale Elementary School – The school was built in 1937 and is located on 45 South 3rd Ave. Now called Michael Anderson School, renamed in honor of Michael P. Anderson.
- The Avon Theater – The theater was built in 1947 and is located at 16 E. Western Ave.
- Burger Building – This Googie style building was constructed in 1960 and is located at 60 East Western Ave.
- Church Building – This church was built in 1900 and is located in 11 N. 3rd. Ave. It now houses the Salvation Army branch of Avondale.
- The Goodyear Farms Historic Cemetery – established in 1917, where many of the farm workers who perished during the 1918 Spanish Flu pandemic are buried in unmarked graves.
- The Graves of Amado B. Sernas (1908–1994) former city councilman and his wife Francisca T. Sernas (1907–1988) in the Goodyear Farms Historic Cemetery.

== Historic properties and structures in Avondale ==
Historic Avondale

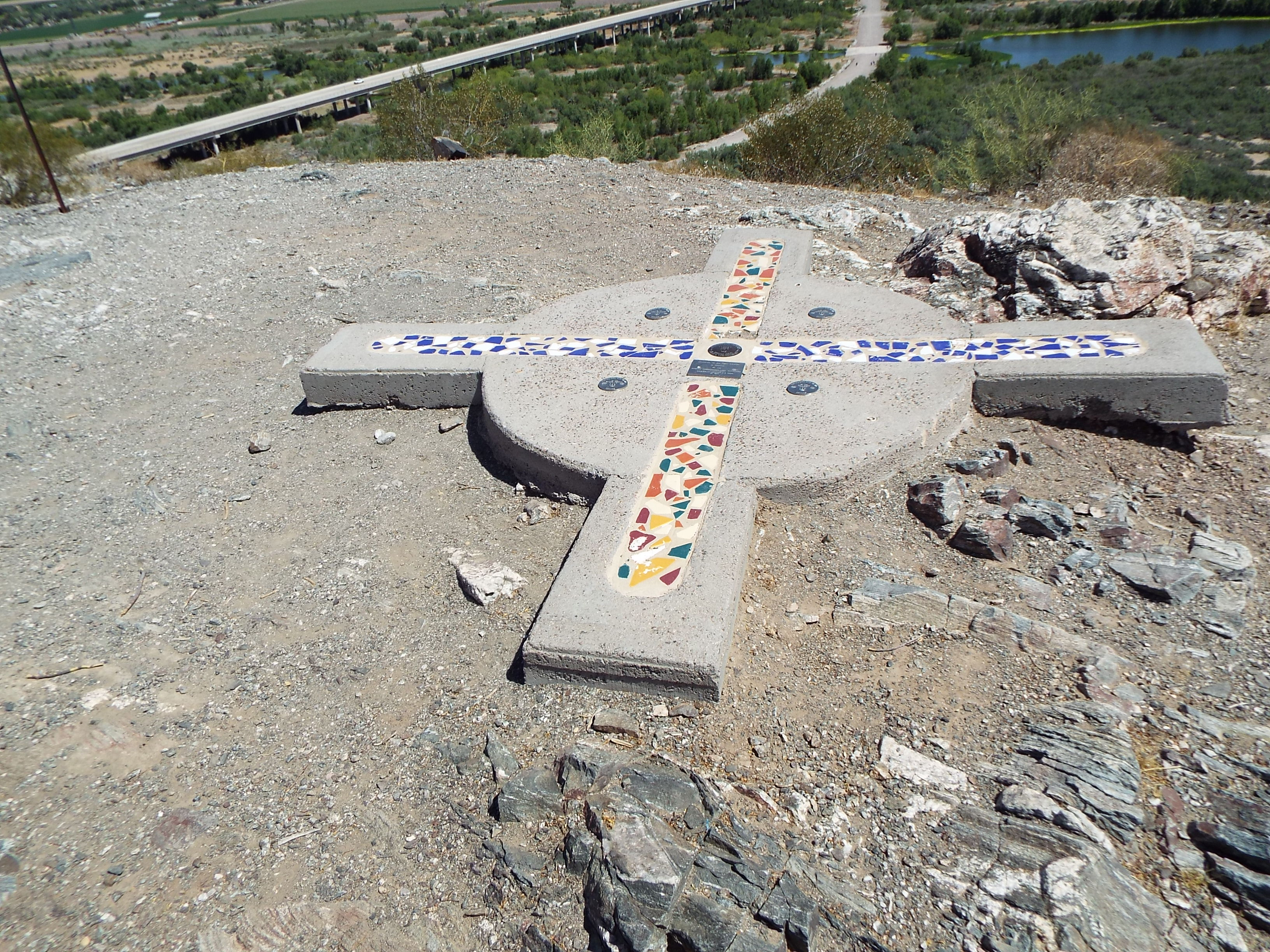
The initial point of the Gila and Salt River Meridan.

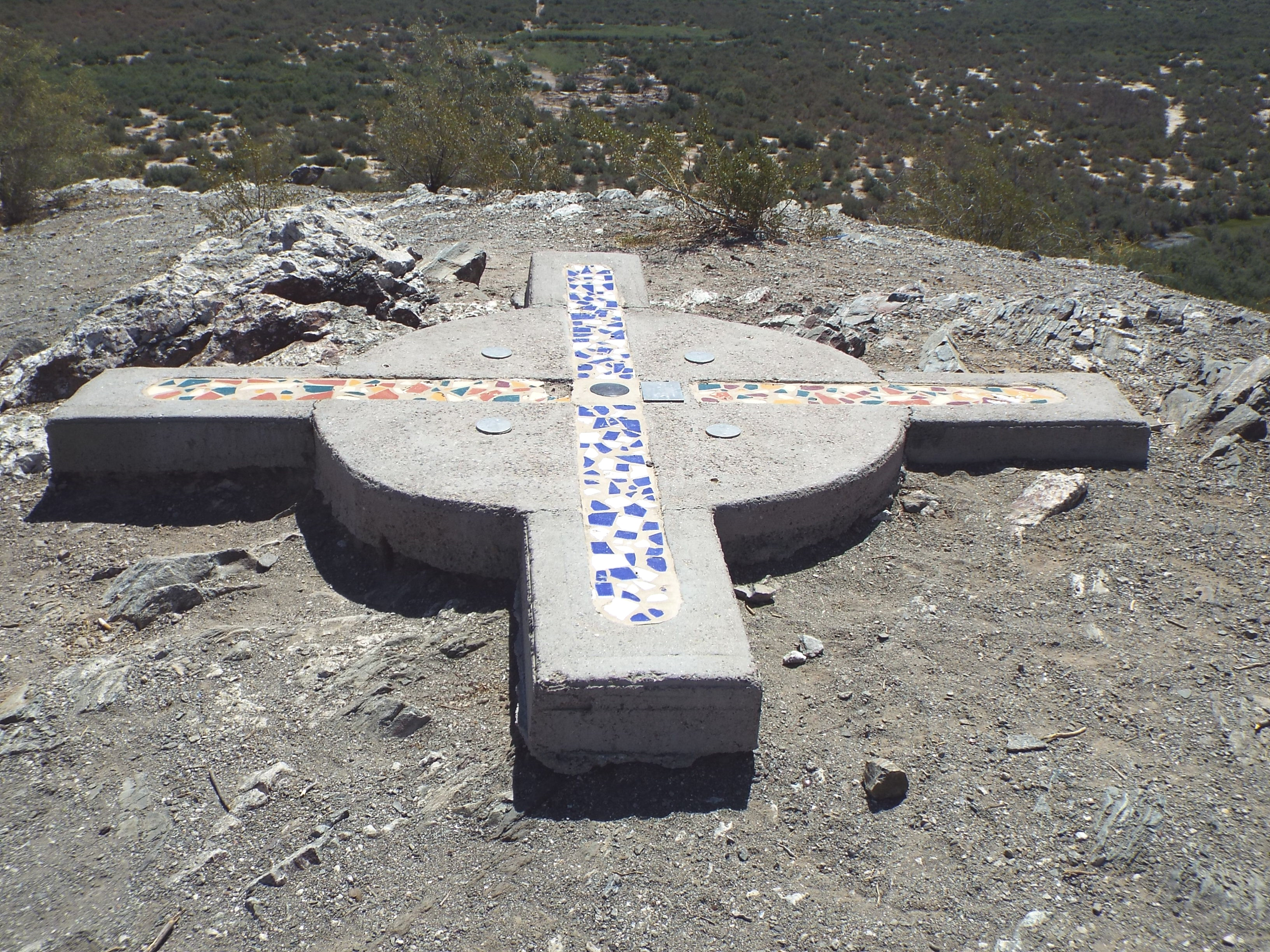
Different view of the initial point of the Gila and Salt River Meridan .

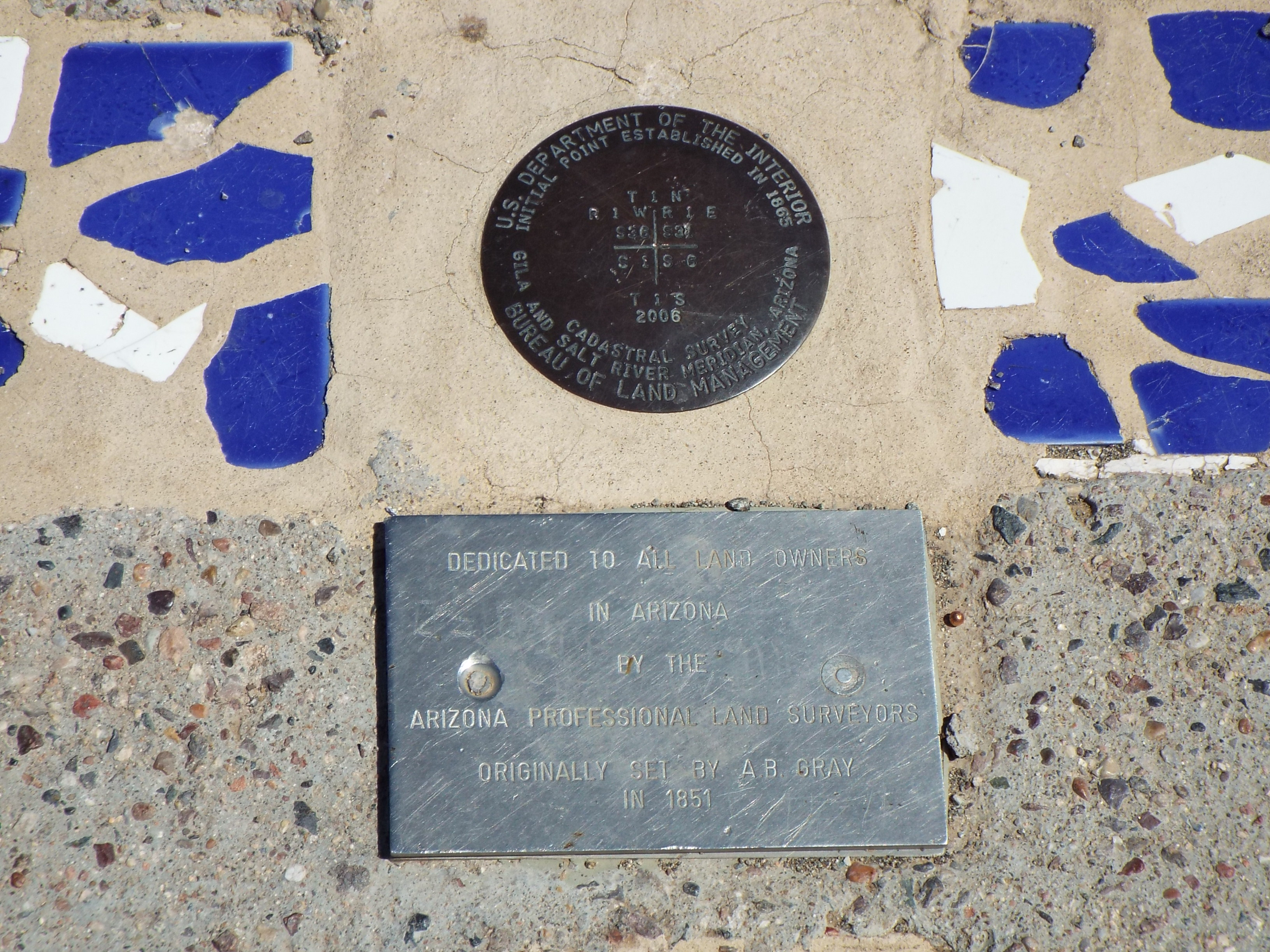
Gila and Salt River Meridan Marker.

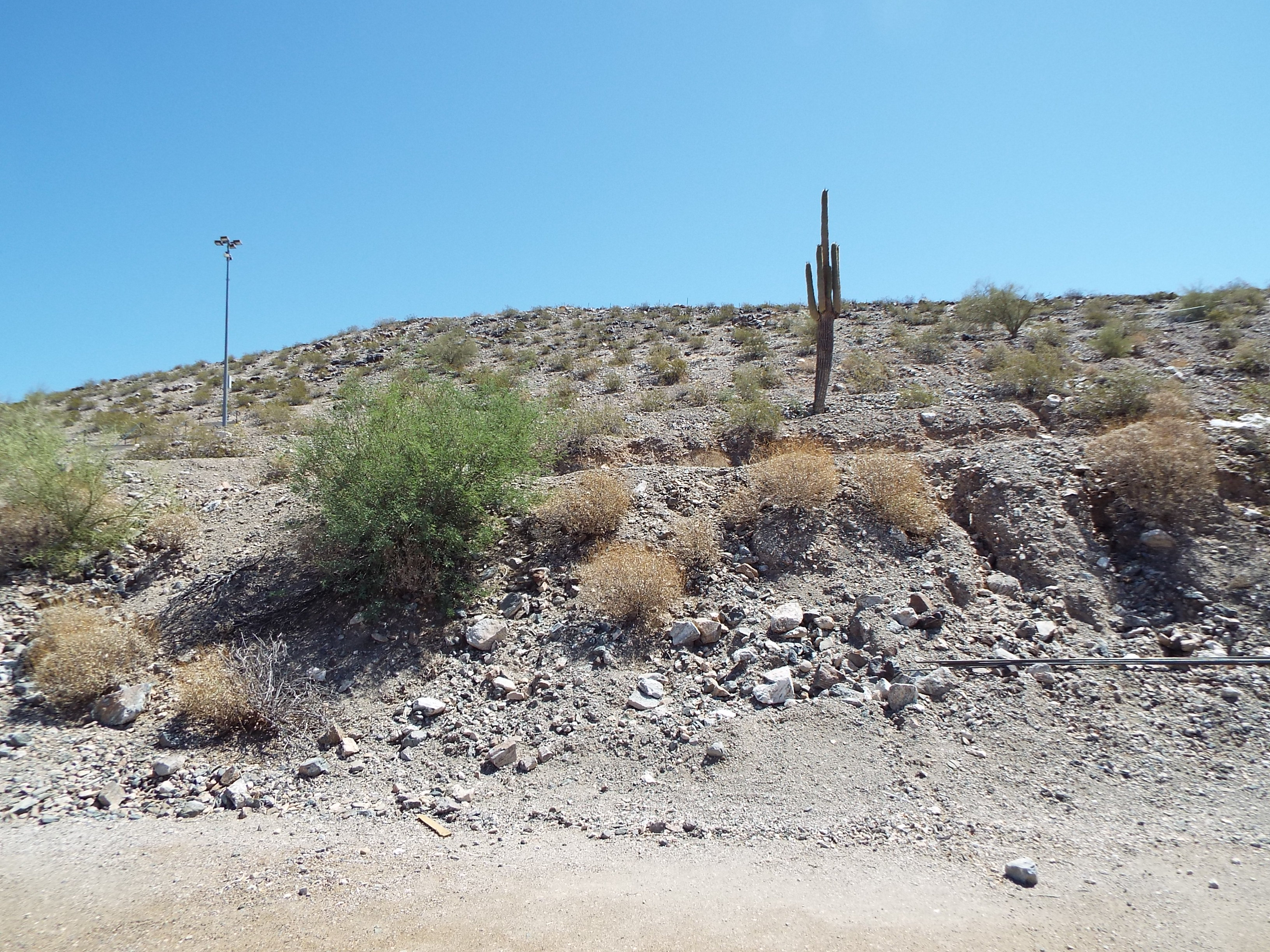
Monument Hill.

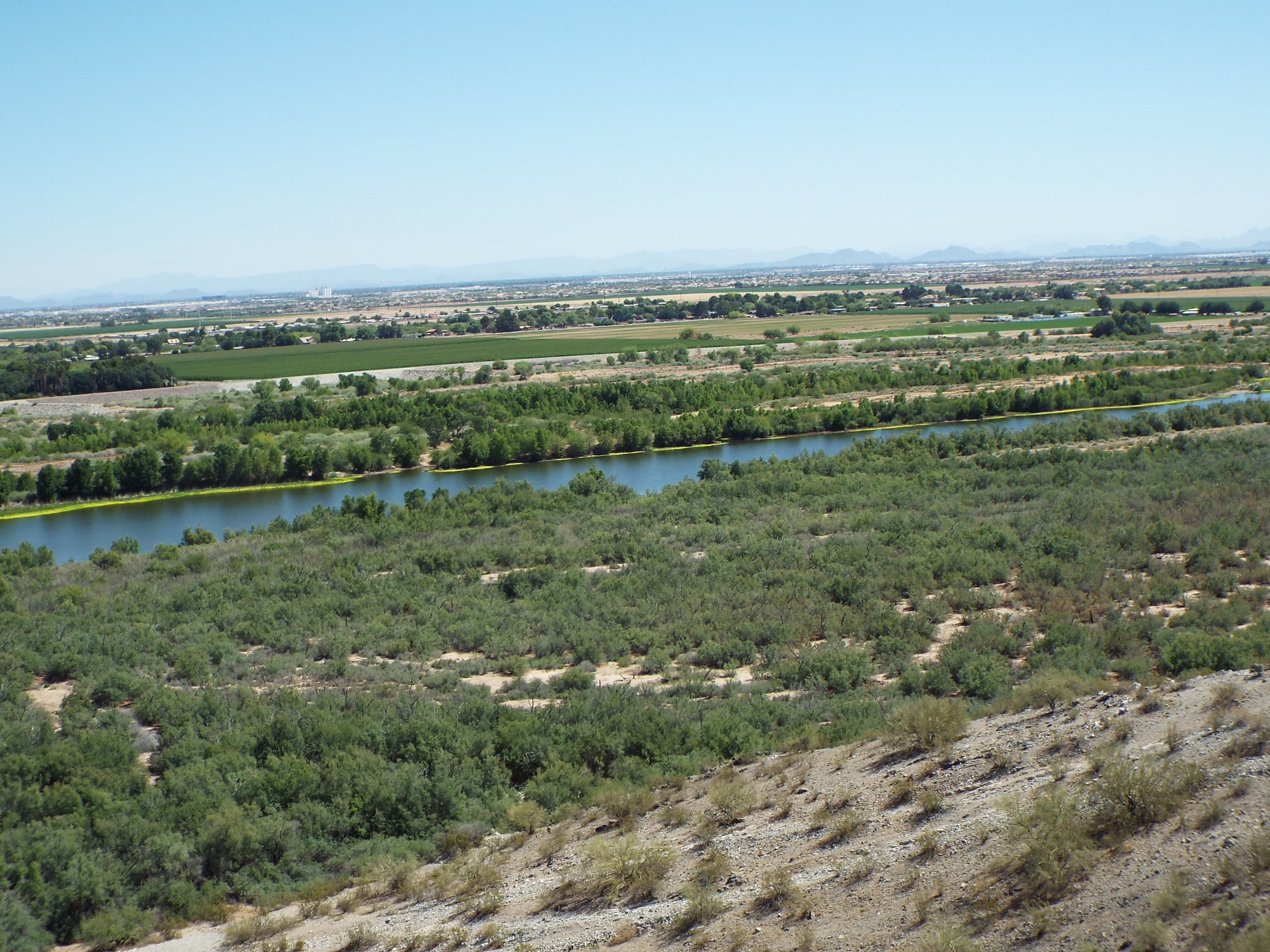
Gila River.

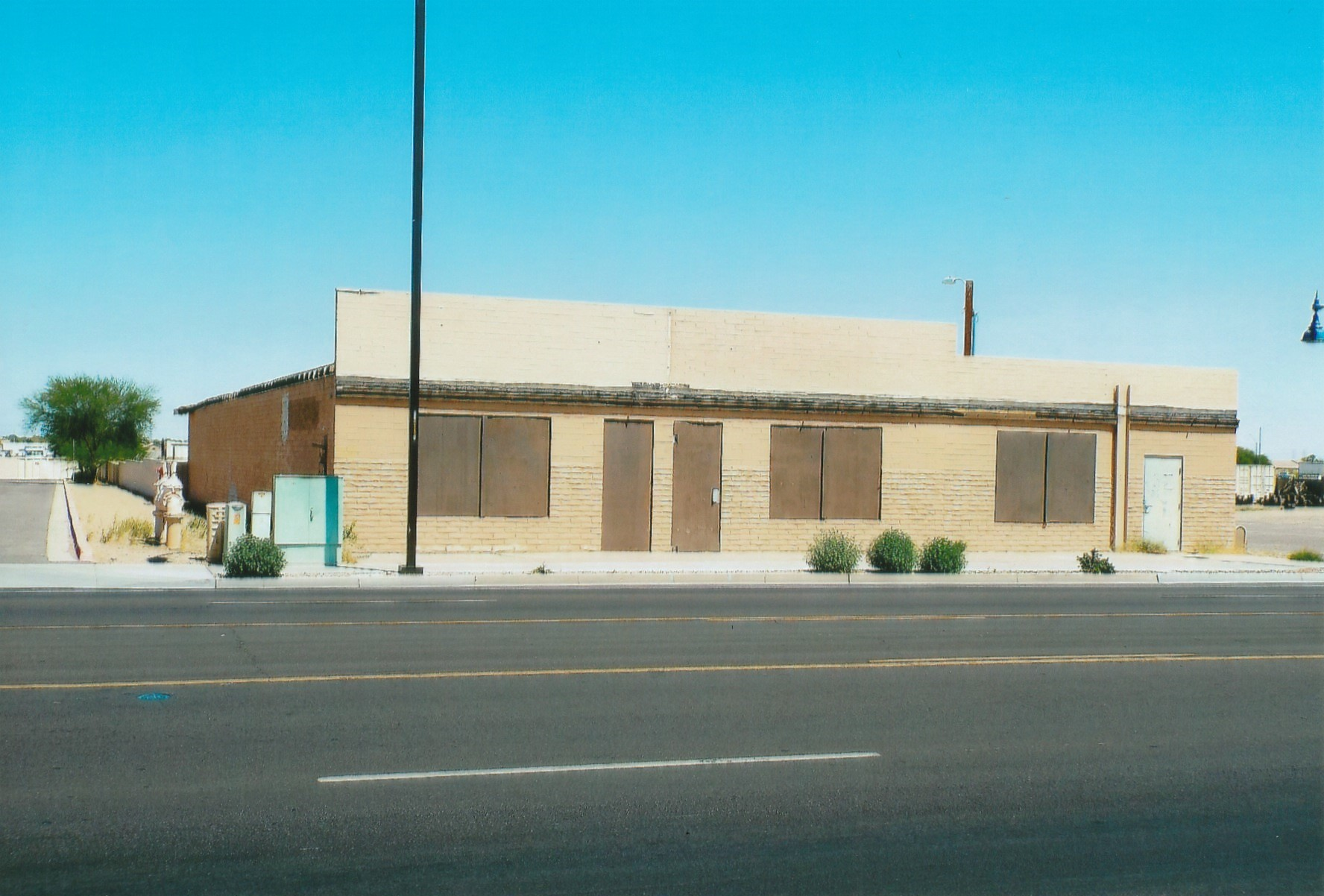
Old Commercial Building.

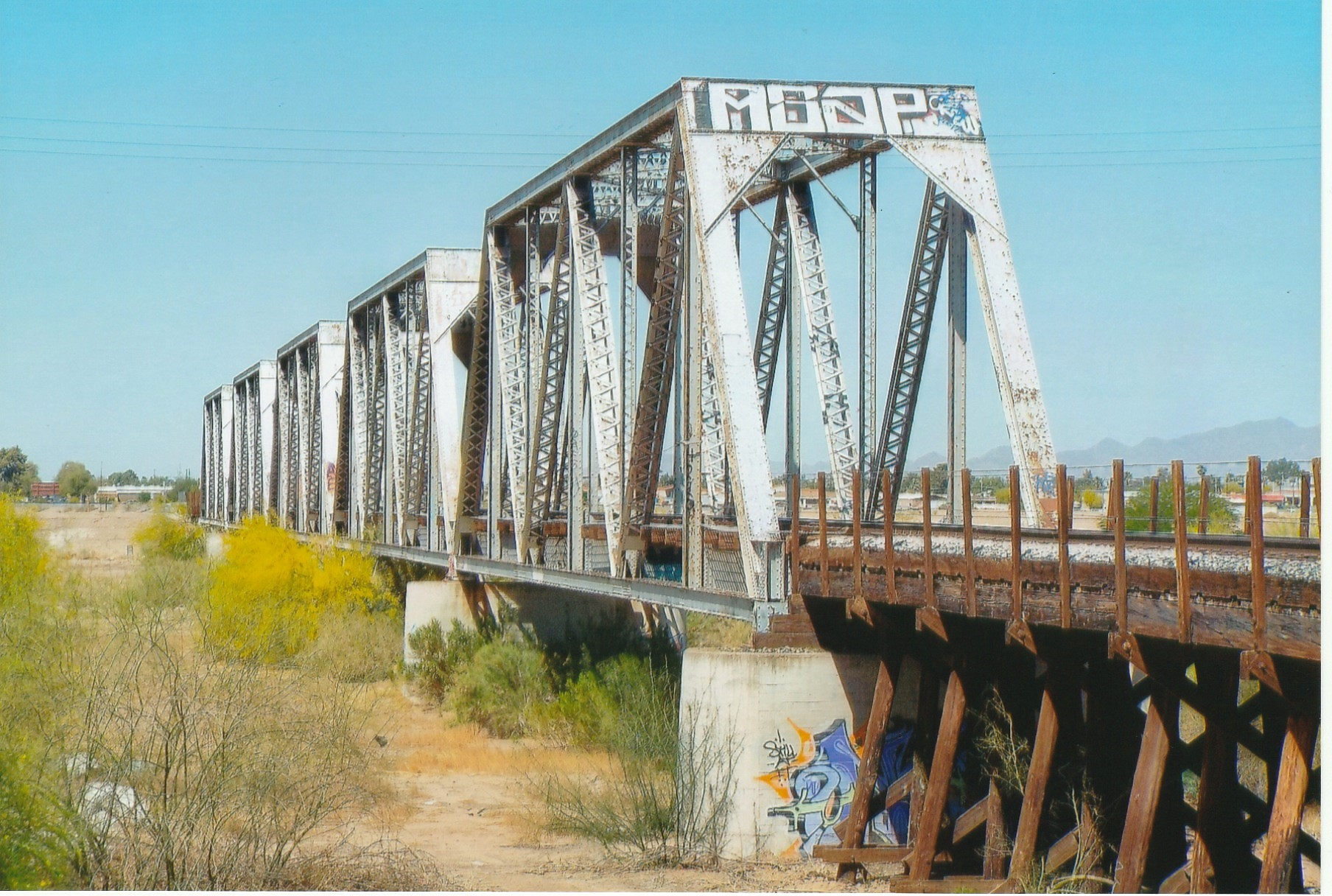
Union Pacific Railroad Bridge.

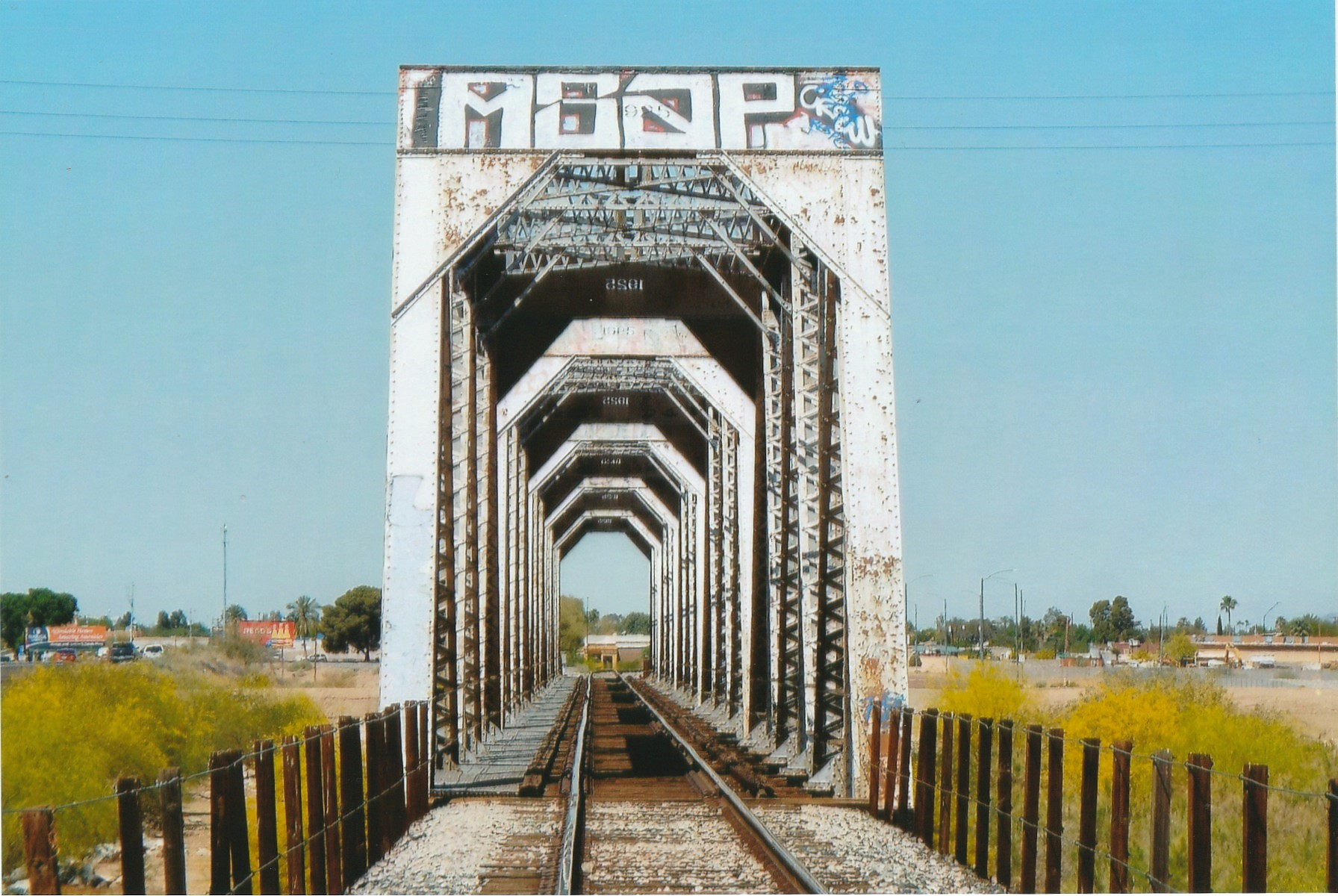
Union Pacific Railroad Bridge.
Historic Corridor

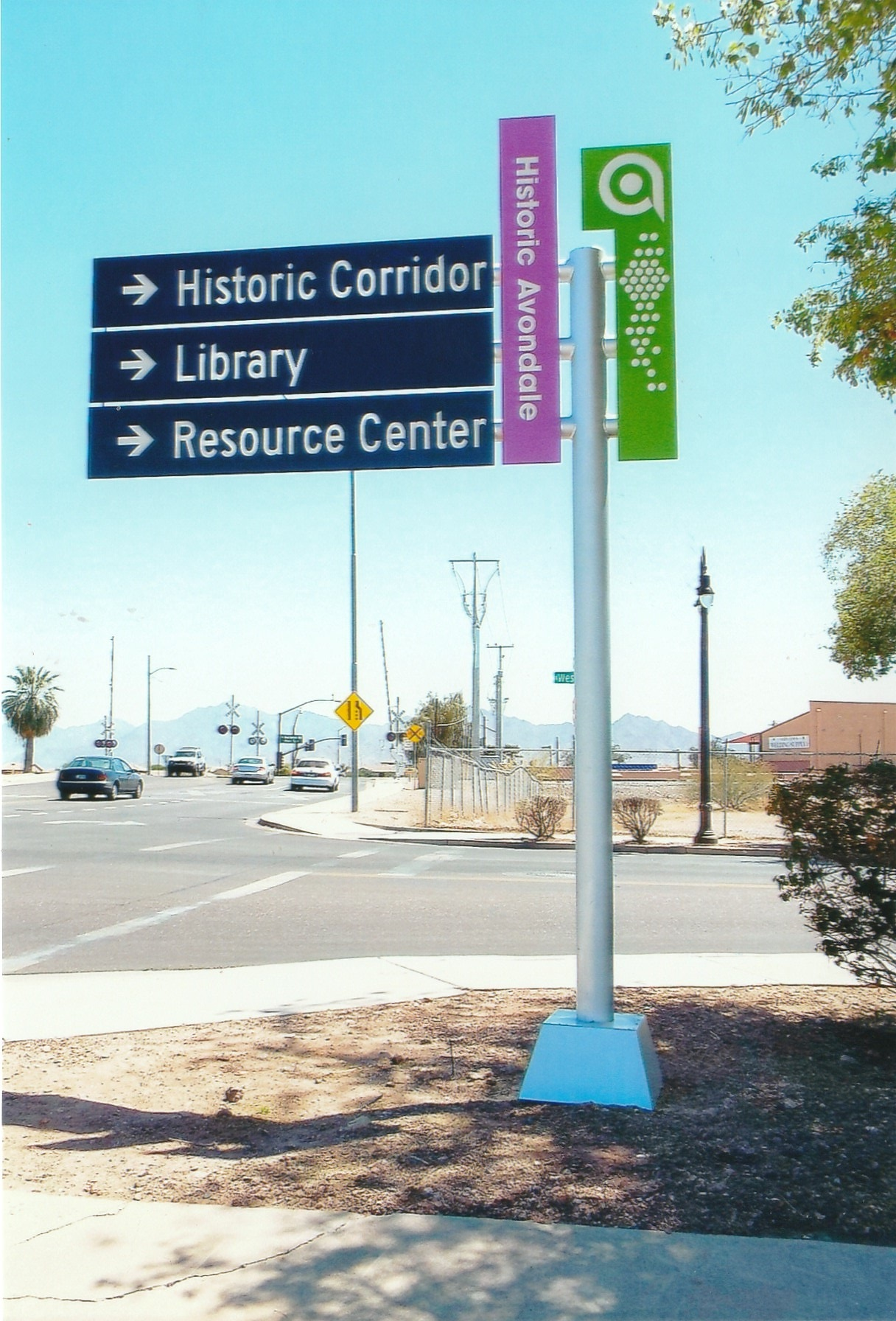
Historic Corridor sign.

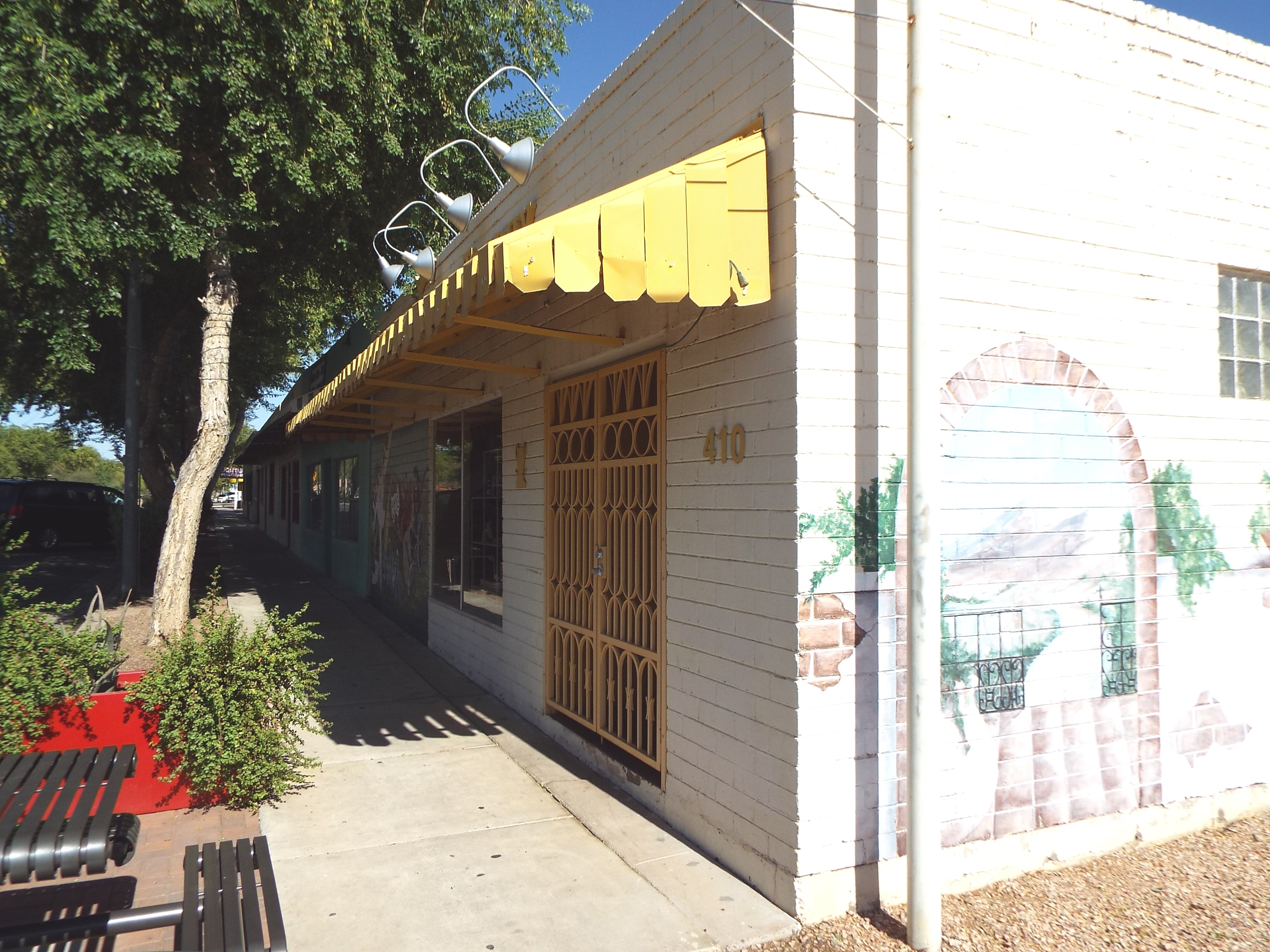
Downtown Avondale.

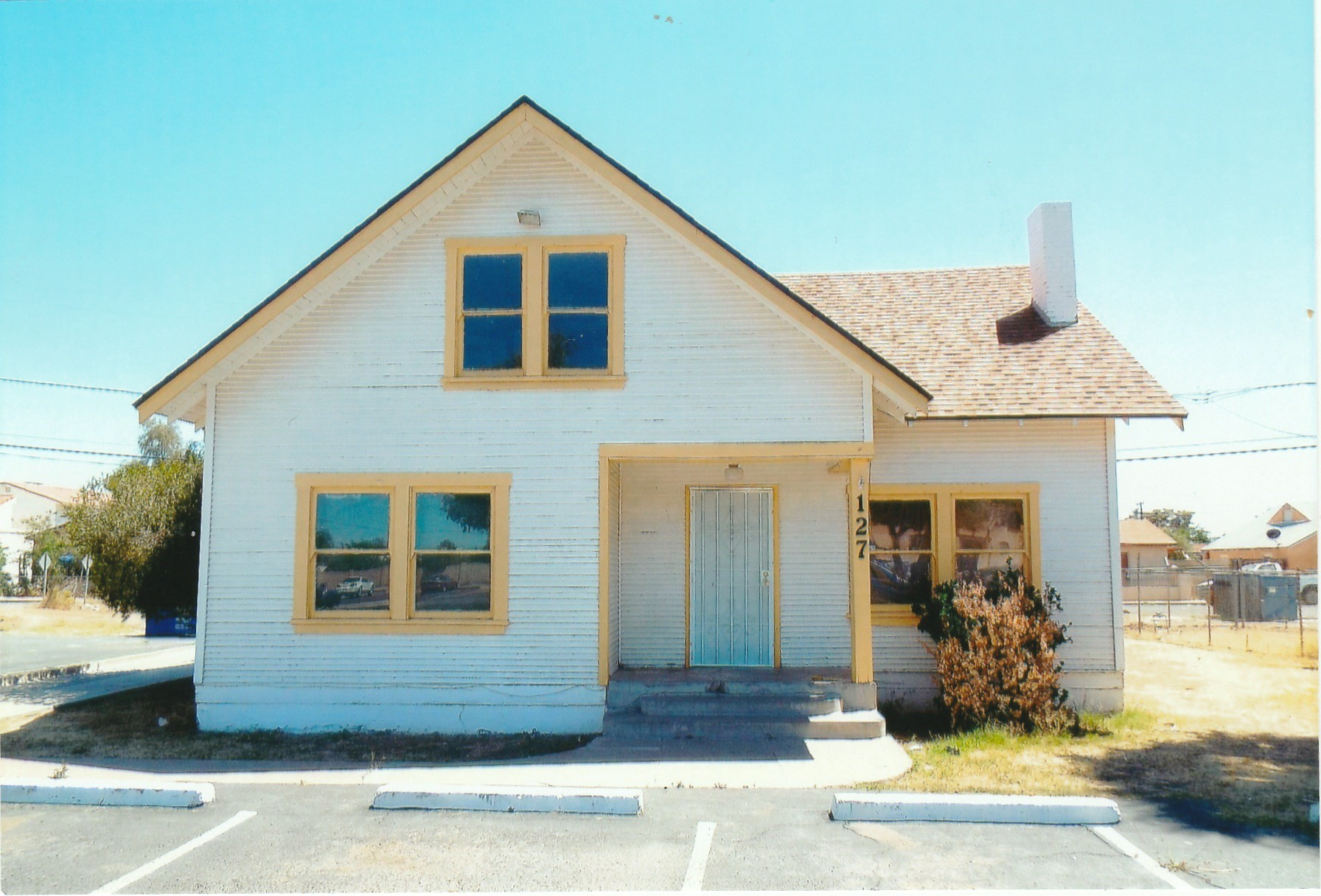
The White House.

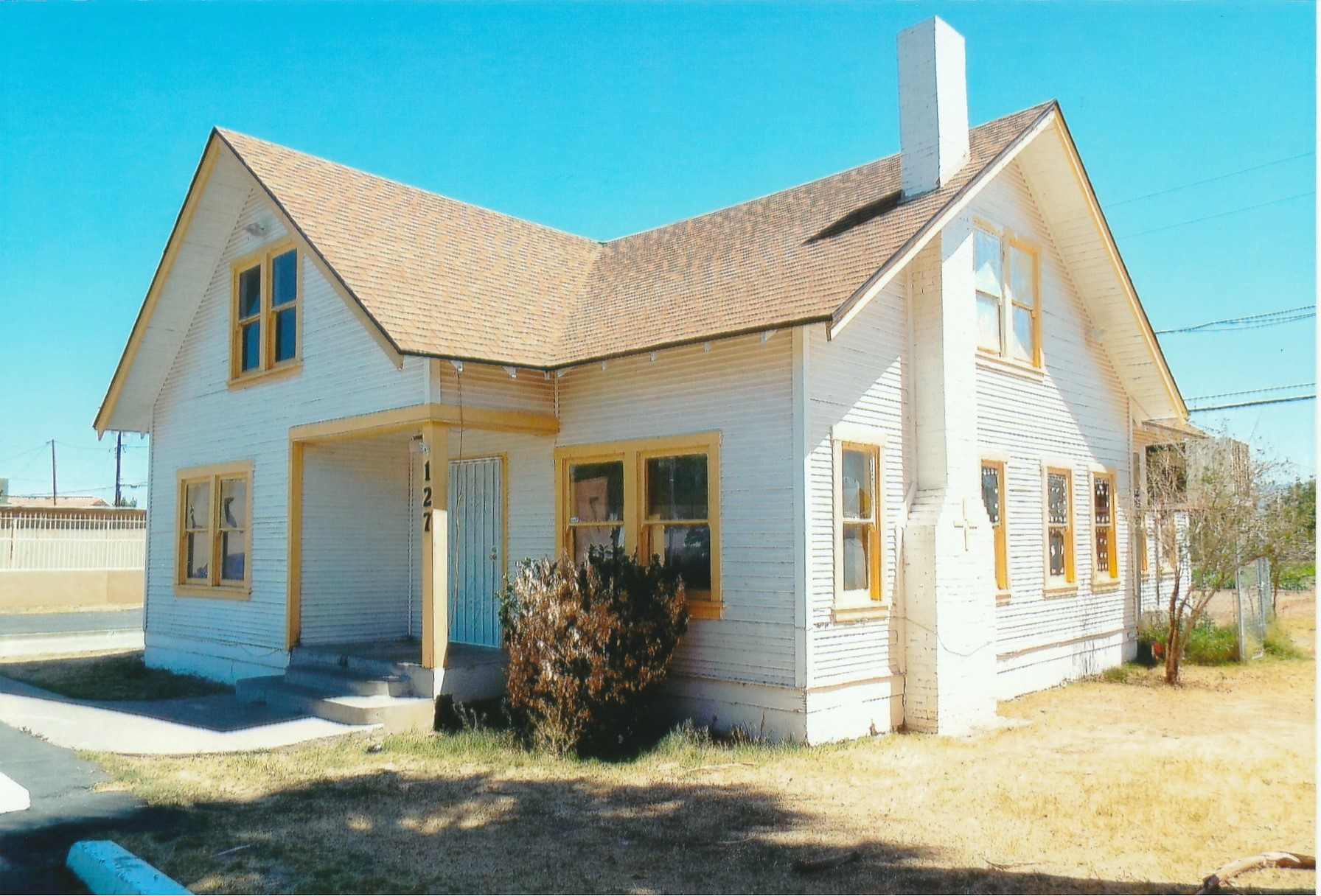
Different view of the White House.

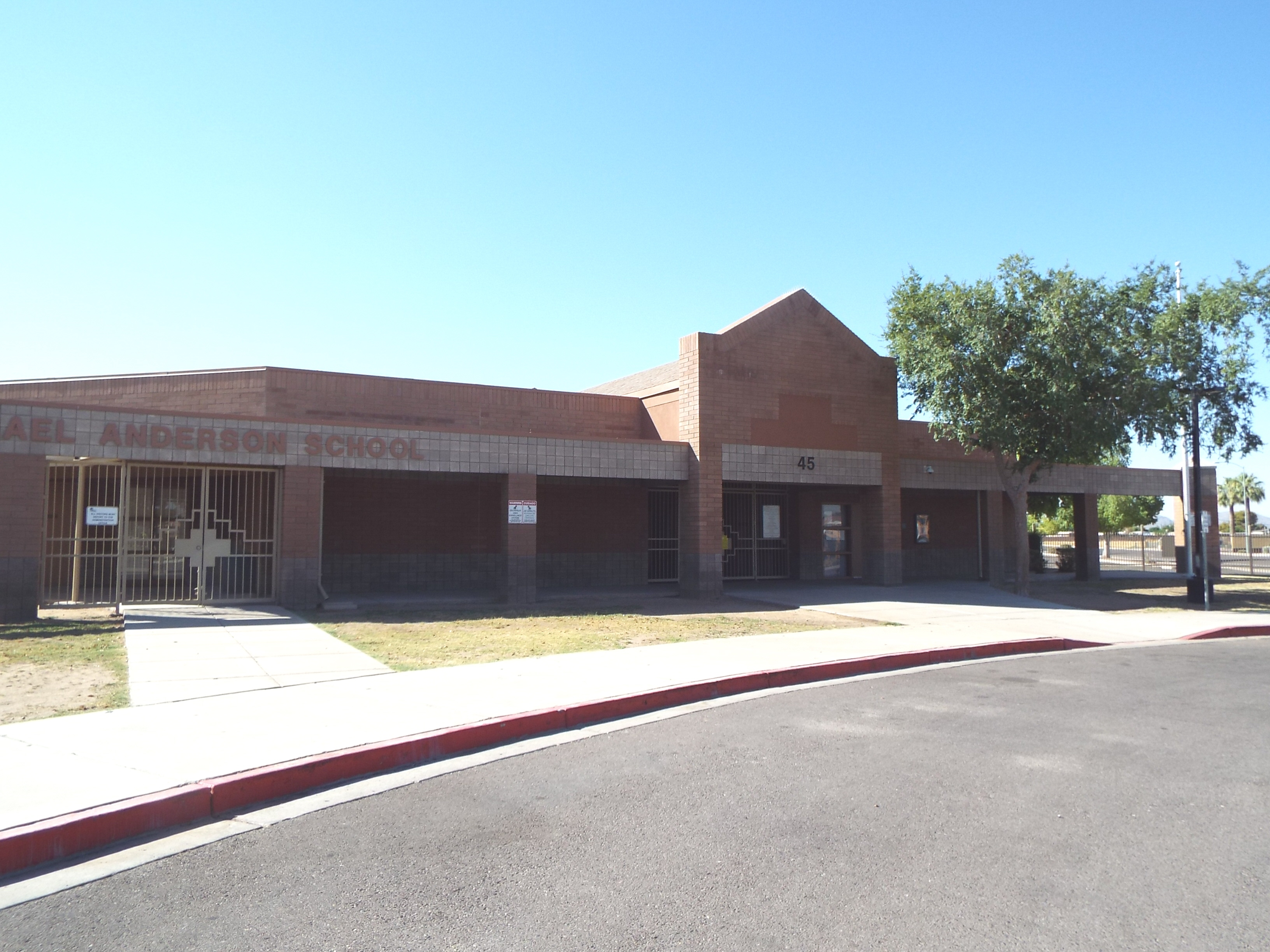
Avondale Elementary School.

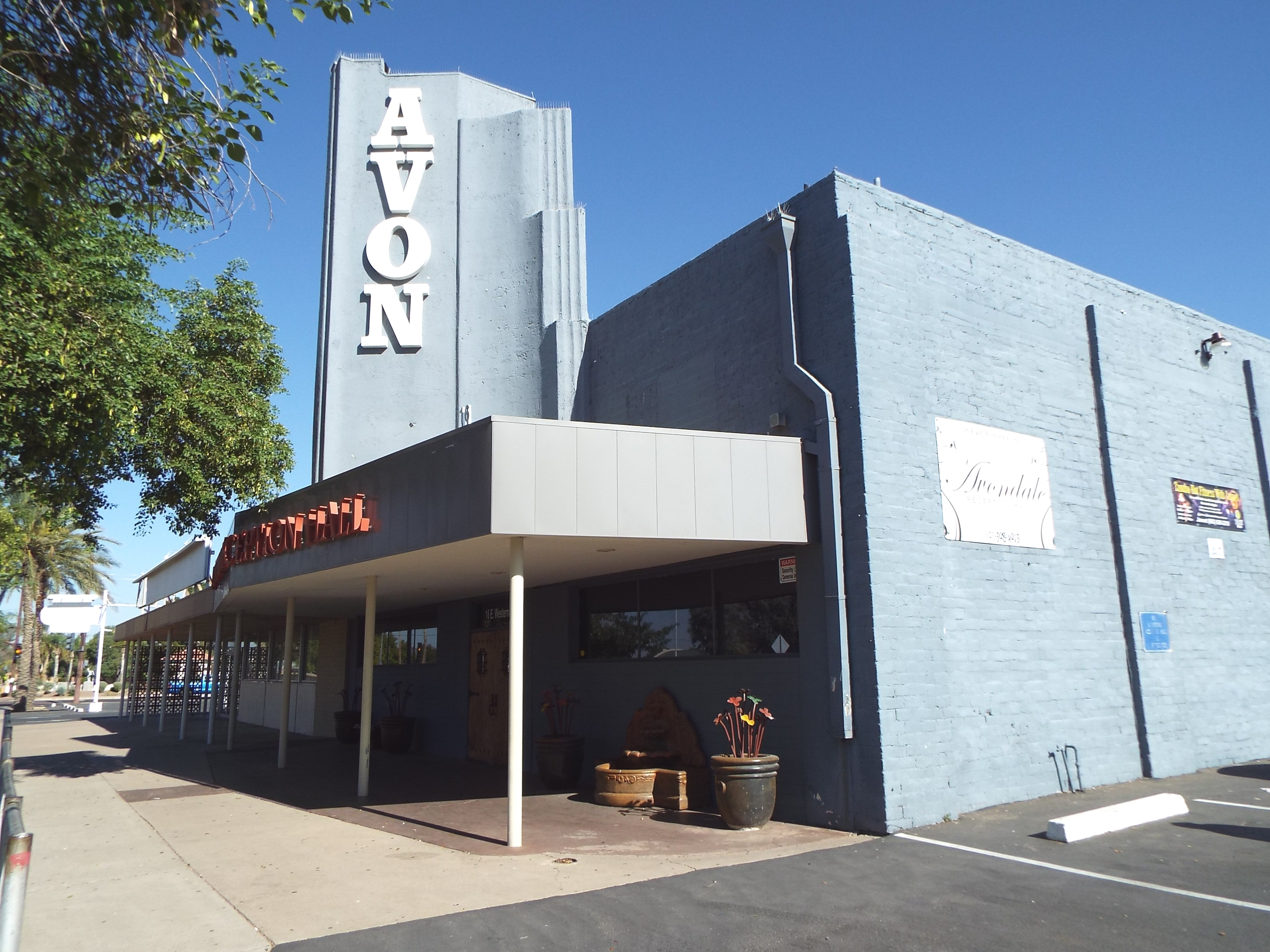
The Avon Theater

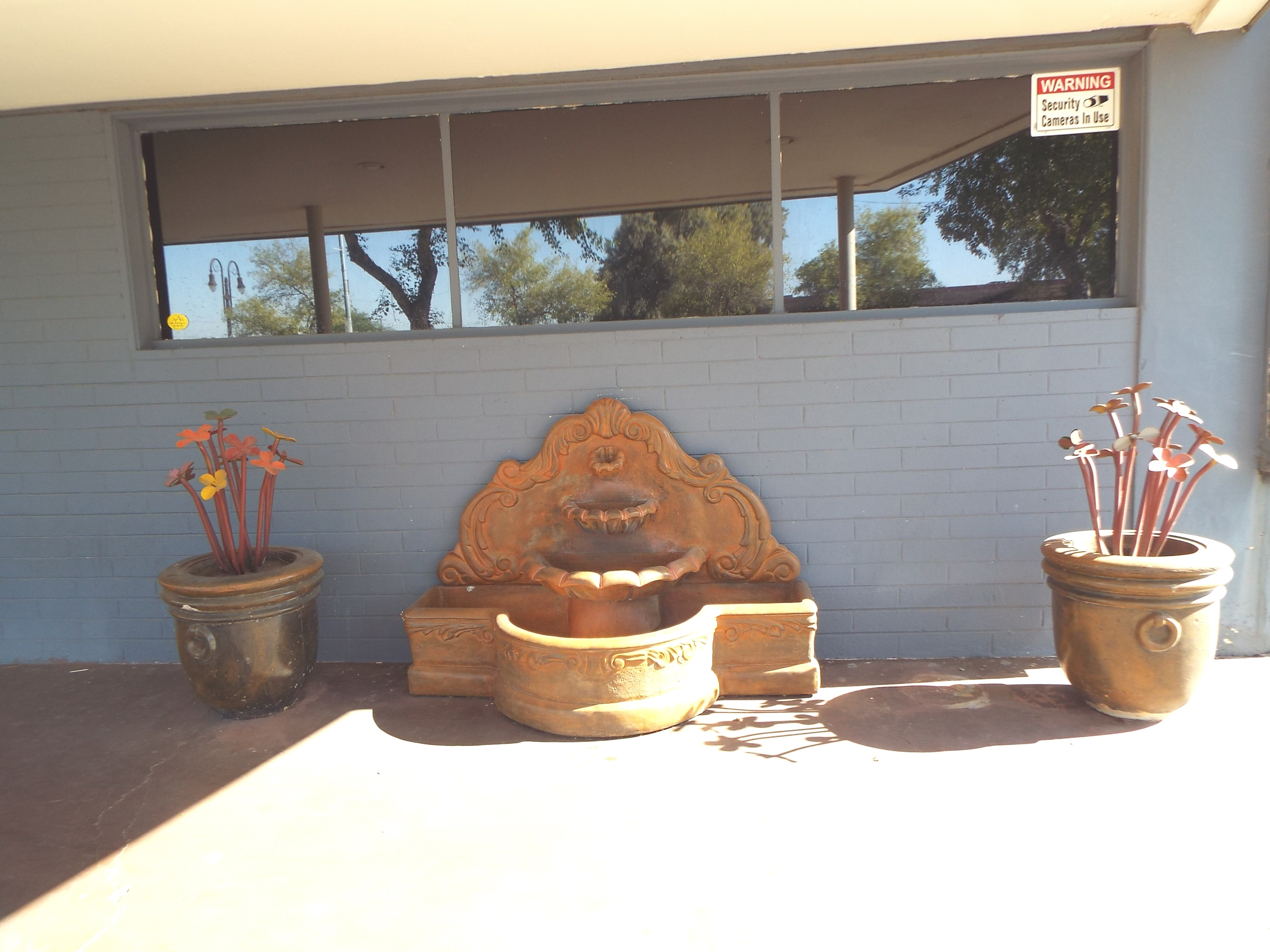
Front of the Avon Theater.

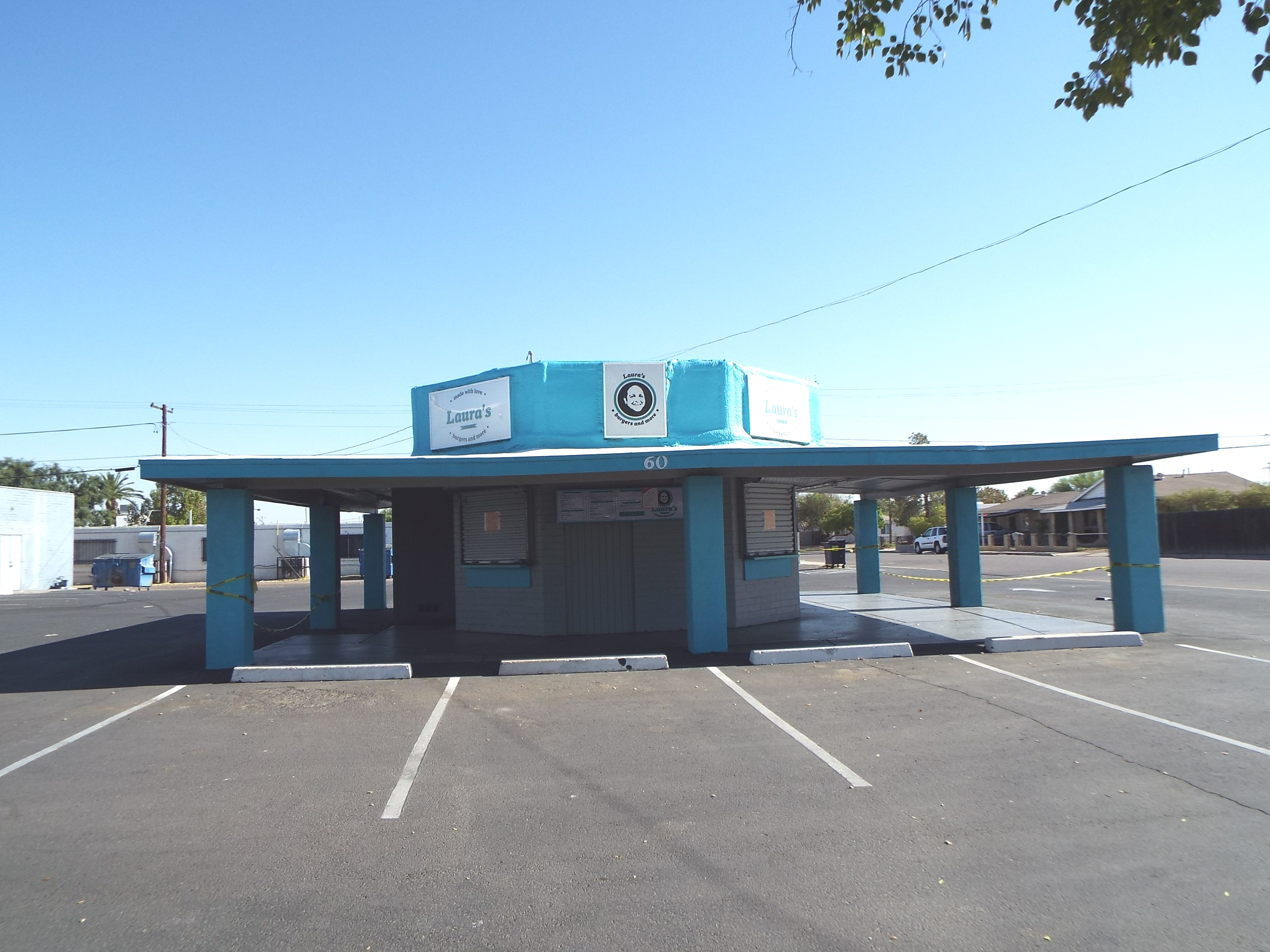
Burger building.

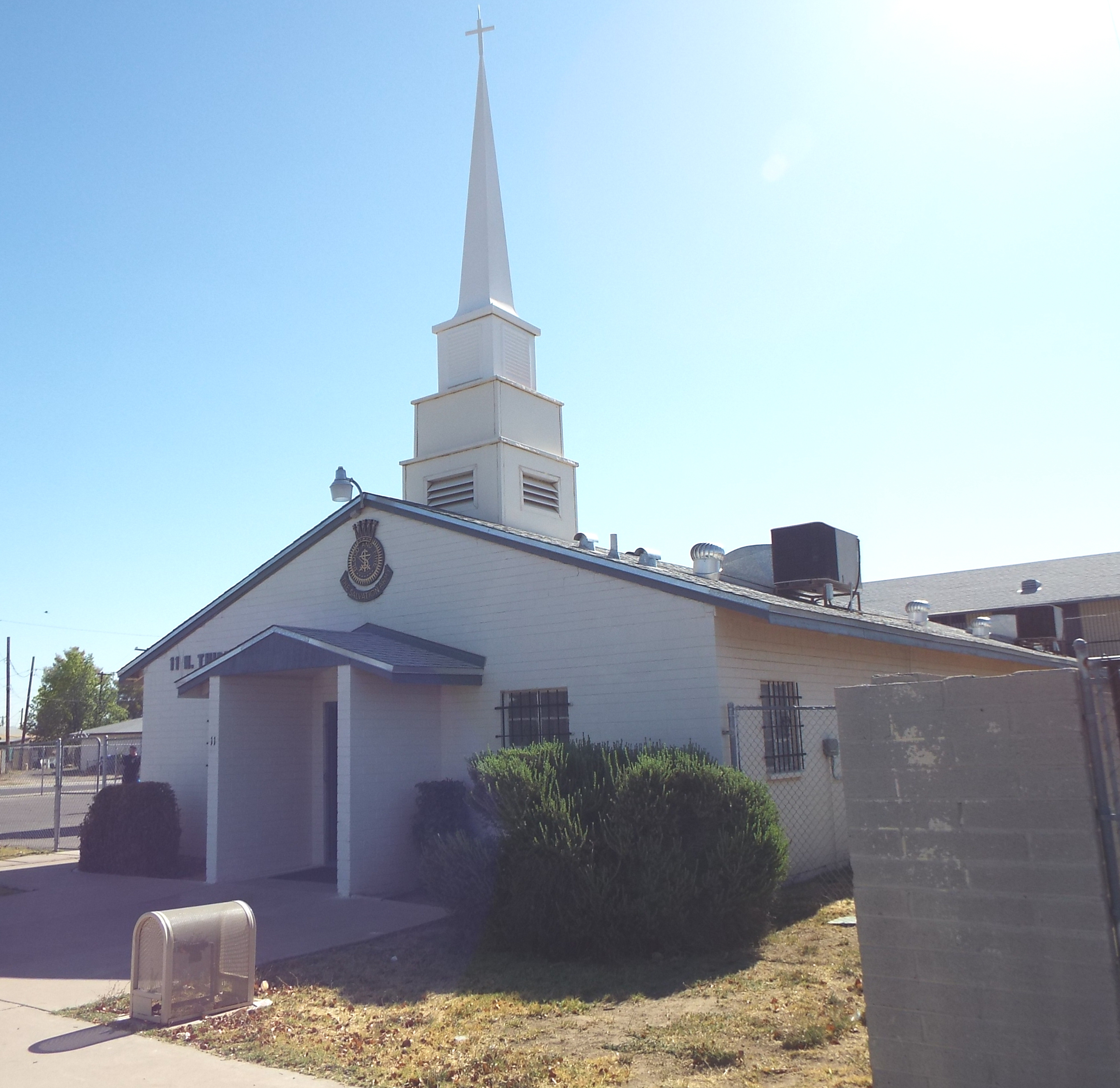
Church building.

The historic Goodyear Farms Historic Cemetery established in 1917, where many of the farm workers who perished during the 1918 Spanish Flu pandemic are buried in unmarked graves.

Goodyear Farms Historic Cemetery

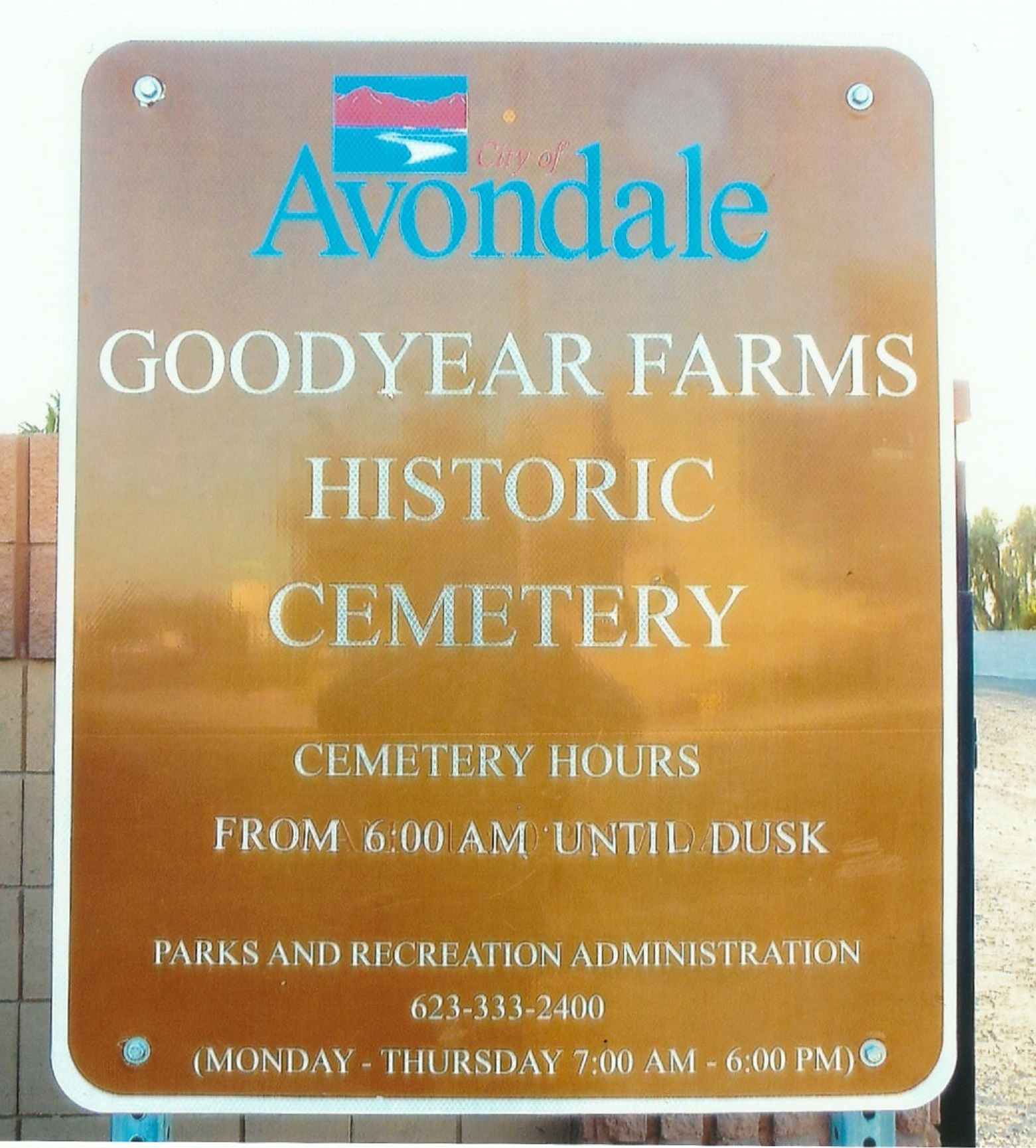
Goodyear Farms Historic Cemetery

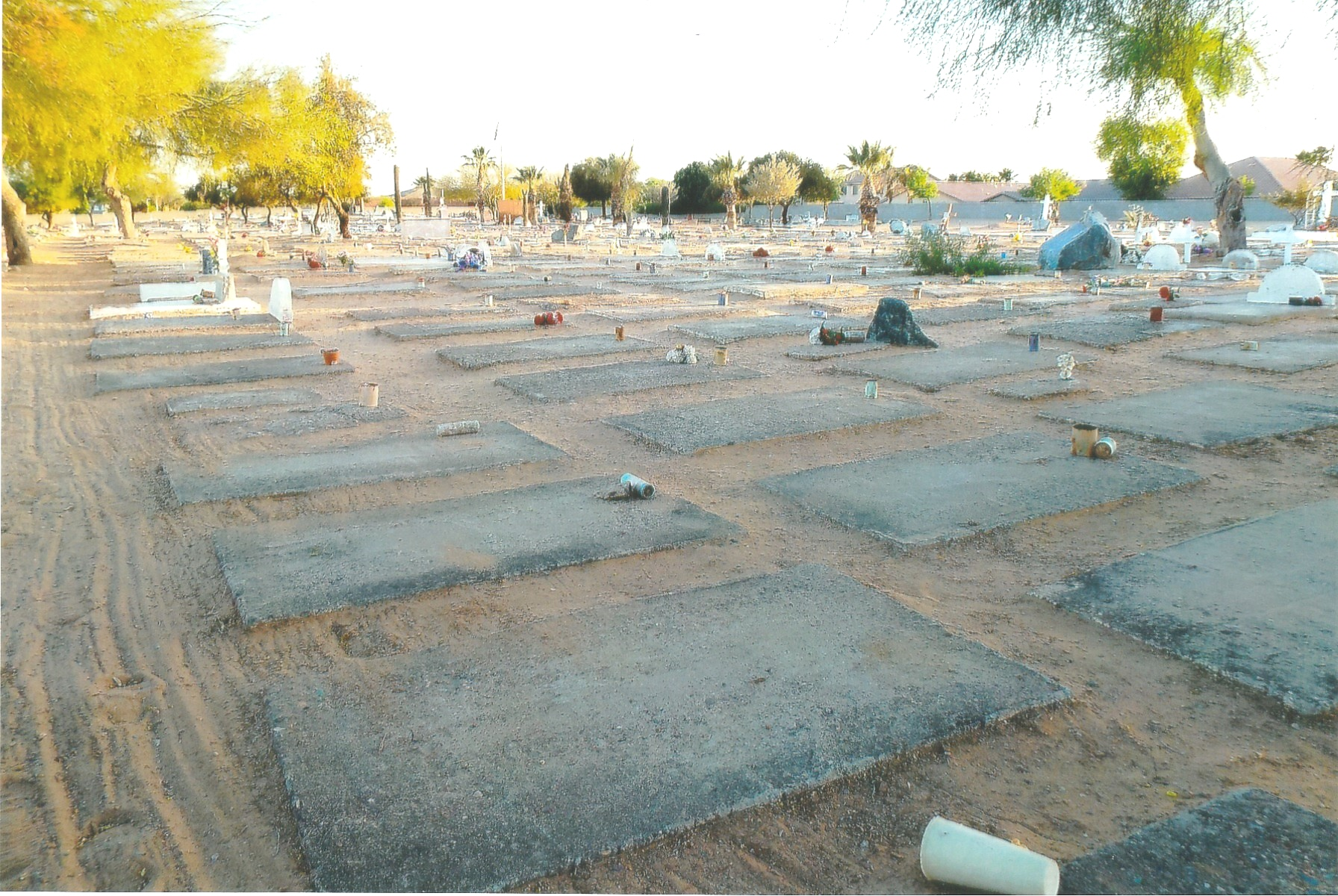
Unmarked graves.

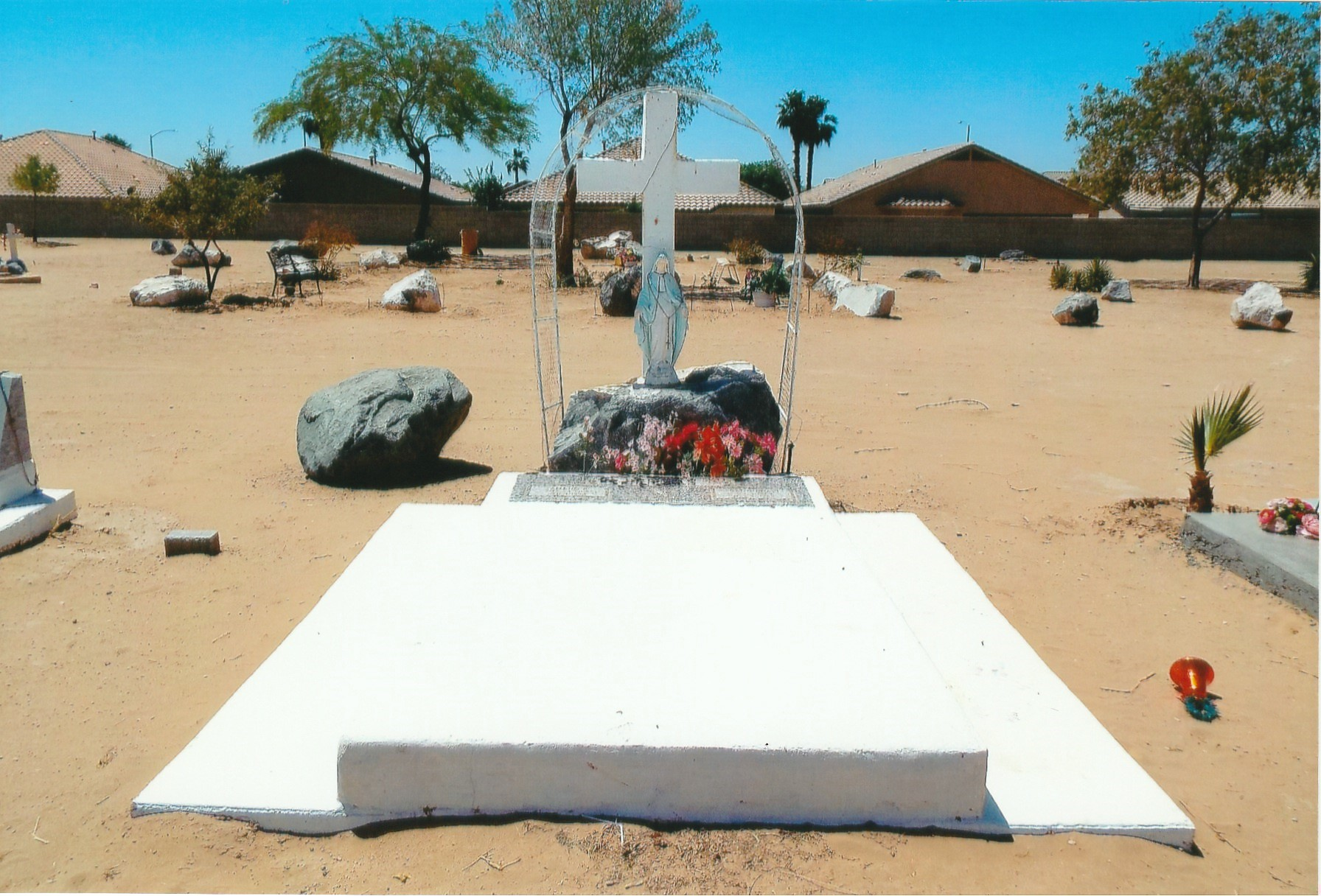
Graves of Amado B. Sernas (1908–1994) and his wife Francisca T. Sernas (1907–1988).

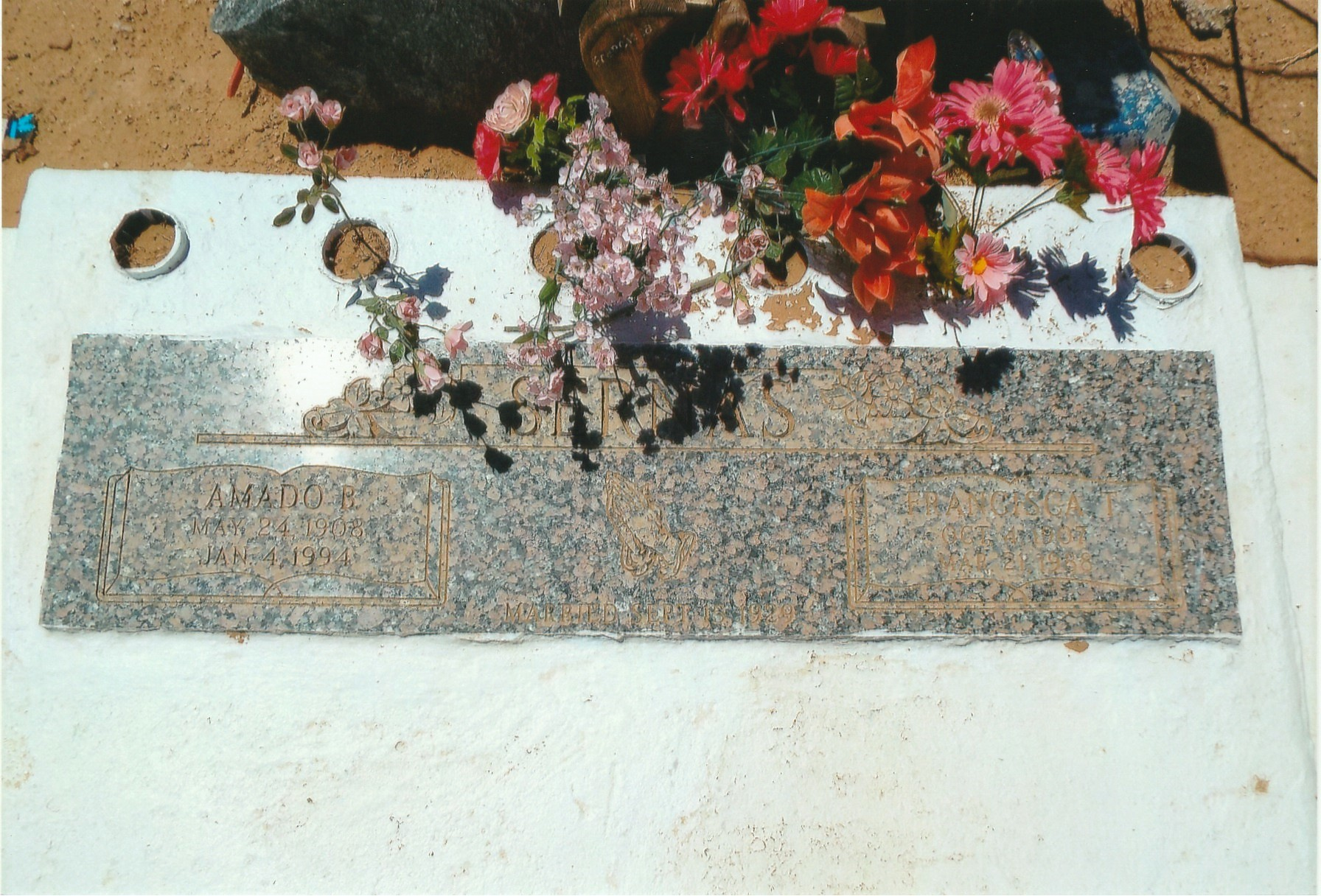
Inscription on the Sernas tomb.

== See also ==
- Avondale, Arizona
- National Register of Historic Places listings in Arizona
- National Register of Historic Places listings in Maricopa County, Arizona
