= Lorenzo Sierra =

American politician

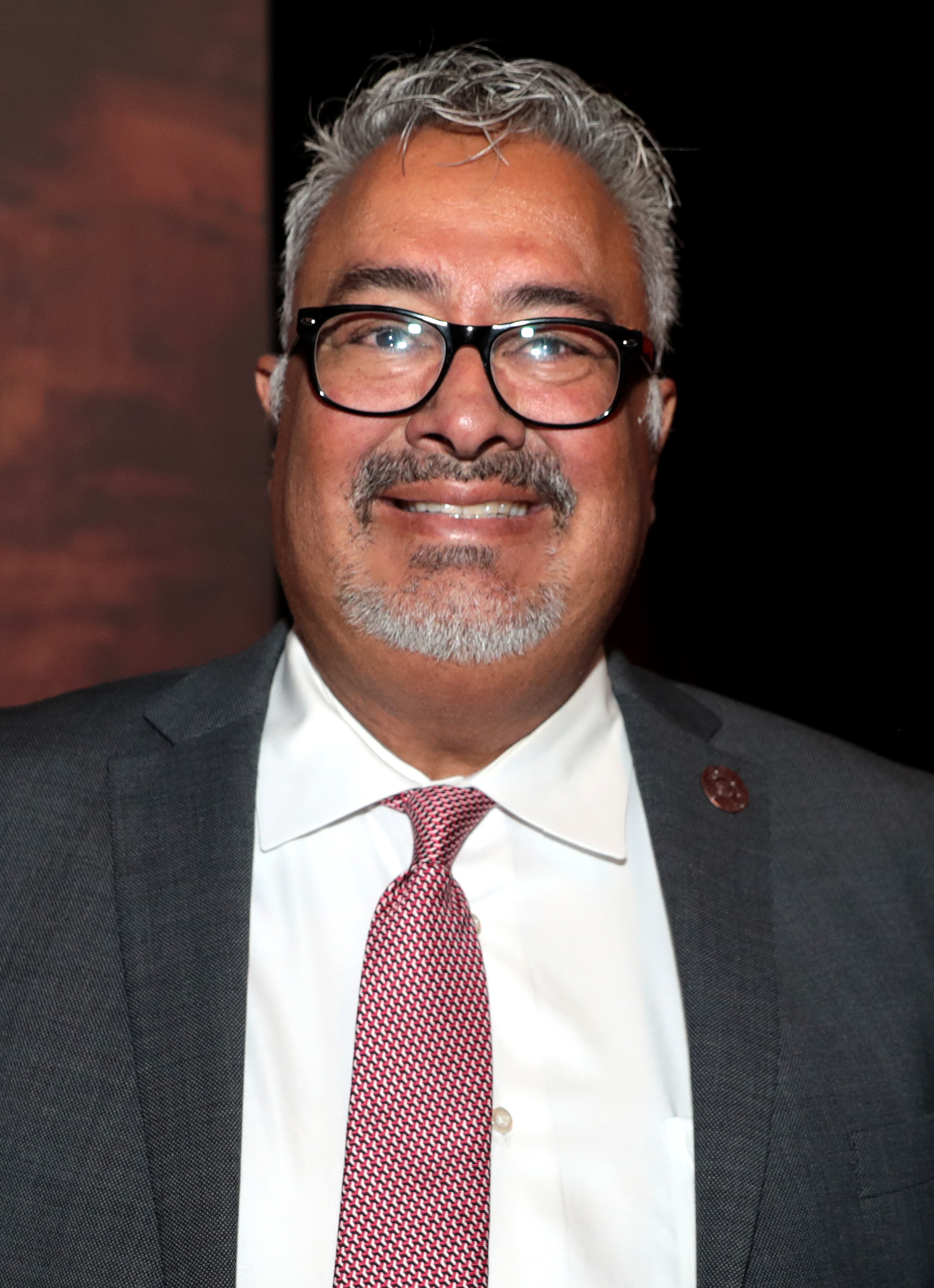
- Sierra in 2020

Member of the Arizona House of Representatives from the 19th district
- In office January 14, 2019 – January 9, 2023 Serving with Diego Espinoza
- Preceded by: Mark Cardenas
- Succeeded by: Gail Griffin

Personal details
- Born: 1966 or 1967 (age 59–60)
- Party: Democratic

Lorenzo Sierra (born 1966 or 1967) is an American politician and a former Democratic member of the Arizona House of Representatives representing District 19 from 2019 to 2023. Sierra was elected in 2018 to succeed retiring State Representative Mark Cardenas.

Sierra graduated from Arizona State University with a degree in journalism, and was a member of Maricopa County Sheriff Paul Penzone's Hispanic Advisory Board, as well as served as Vice Chair of the Arizona Hispanic Chamber of Commerce.
