= Diego Espinoza =

American politician

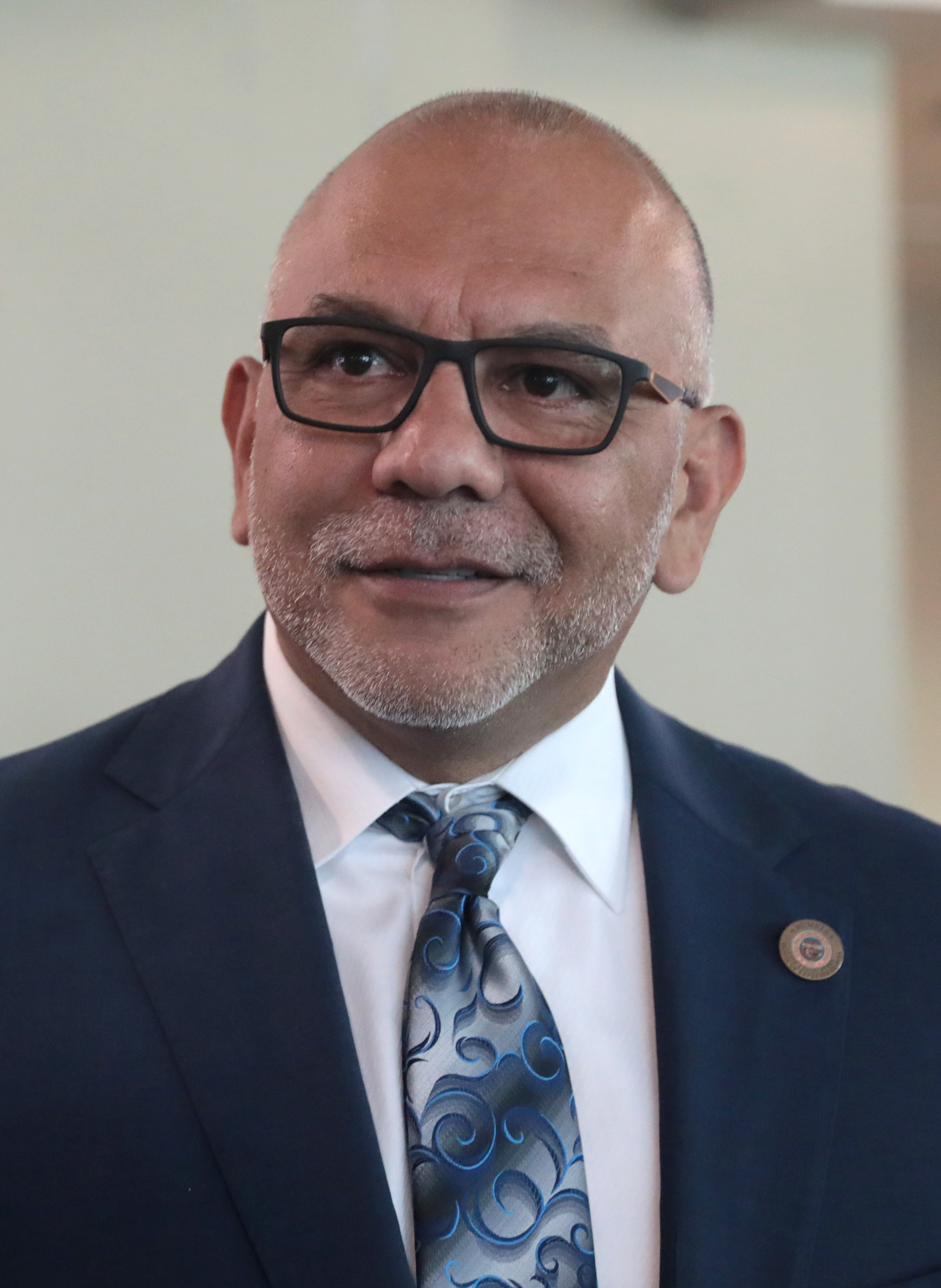
- Espinoza in 2022

Member of the Arizona House of Representatives from the 19th district
- In office January 5, 2015 – September 5, 2022 Serving with Lorenzo Sierra
- Succeeded by: Lupe Diaz

Personal details
- Party: Democratic

Diego Espinoza is a former Democratic member of the Arizona House of Representatives, serving since 2015. On September 5, 2022, he resigned from the Arizona House of Representatives, and withdrew from the Arizona Senate election, to pursue a career outside of politics.

== Elections ==
- 2014 Espinoza and Mark Cardenas were unopposed in the Democratic primary. Cardenas and Espinoza defeated Sophia Johnson in the general election.
- Despite having won the Democratic primary in August 2022, Espinoza unexpectedly resigned his seat September 5, 2022 to pursue a career outside of politics. With no other candidates, potential candidates had until 5:00 p.m. on November 3 to file as write-ins.
