= Littleton Elementary School District =

School district in Maricopa County, Arizona

Coordinates: 33.413°N 112.307°W

The Littleton Elementary School District is an elementary school district headquartered in Avondale, Arizona. It was originally established to serve the community of Cashion, Arizona, which was later annexed by Avondale. It serves Avondale, Tolleson, and Phoenix. It operates nine elementary schools.

== Schools ==
- Collier Business Academy
- Country Place Leadership Academy
- Estrella Vista STEM Academy
- Fine Arts Academy
- Lakin Prep Academy
- Littleton Elementary
- LESD Online Academy
- Tres Rios Service Academy
- Quentin Elementary
