= La Joya Community High School =

Public high school in Avondale, Maricopa County, Arizona

Location
- 11650 West Whyman Avenue; Avondale, Arizona 85323; United States; 33°25′32″N 112°18′36″W

Information
- Type: Public high school
- Motto: The strength of the wolf is the pack, and the strength of the pack is the wolf.
- Established: 2002
- Principal: William Sorenson
- Teaching staff: 95.80 (FTE)
- Enrollment: 2,173 (2023–2024)
- Student to teacher ratio: 22.68
- Colors: Navy blue, Vegas gold
- Mascot: Fighting Lobo

La Joya Community High School (LJ, LJCHS, or LHS) is a community high school located in Avondale, Arizona, United States. It is one of six high schools in the Tolleson Union High School District and serves grades 9-12. Currently, 2200 students are enrolled. The school's mascot is a Fighting Lobo and the school colors are Navy blue and Vegas gold.

The current principal is Dr. William Sorenson. The five assistant principles are Patti Munoz, Andrew Heytens, Rae Hernandez, Tom Junk, and Joseph Williams.
