= Drisan James =

American gridiron football player (born 1984)

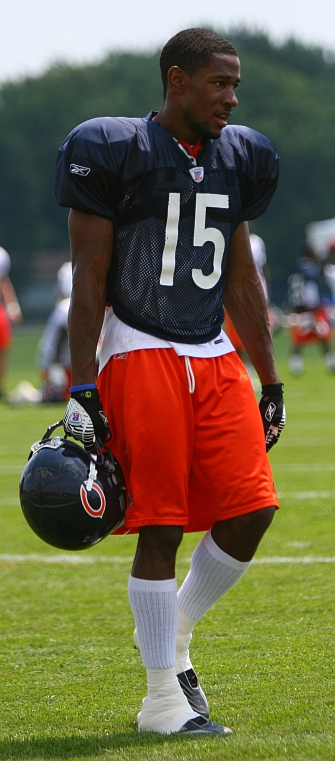
- James at Chicago Bears training camp in 2007

No. 15
- Position: Wide receiver

Personal information
- Born: October 6, 1984 (age 42); Phoenix, Arizona, U.S.
- Listed height: 5 ft 11 in (1.80 m)
- Listed weight: 185 lb (84 kg)

Career information
- College: Boise State
- NFL draft: 2007: undrafted

Career history
- Chicago Bears (2007)*; Oakland Raiders (2007–2008)*; Philadelphia Eagles (2008)*; Hamilton Tiger-Cats (2009–2010)
- * Offseason or practice squad member only

Drisan Bryant James (born October 6, 1984) is a former gridiron football wide receiver. He was signed by the Chicago Bears as an undrafted free agent in 2007. He played college football for the Boise State Broncos.

James has also been a member of the Oakland Raiders and Philadelphia Eagles.

== College career ==
James played college football at Boise State. During his college career, he achieved a total of 115 receptions for 1810 yards. He also rushed 14 times for a gain of 124 yards. Led the team in receiving yards per game (46.2) and yards per catch (16.8) during the 2006 season.

James is best known for his performance in the 2007 Fiesta Bowl, where he caught two touchdown passes against the University of Oklahoma and helped lead Boise State to a 43-42 victory in overtime. Most spectacularly, on a fourth down play with eighteen seconds left in regulation, James caught an eighteen-yard pass and made a brilliant lateral to teammate Jerard Rabb running the opposite way, resulting in a game-tying touchdown with seven seconds left. The play required James to "sell" to the defense the notion that he was going to keep the ball and try for a first down, and also to lateral the ball at the last instant yet lead his teammate in full stride. A close look at the replay shows that had the lateral not been timed and delivered perfectly, the receiver would likely not have made it to the end zone for the tying score.

== Professional career ==
=== National Football League ===
James signed a free agent contract with the National Football League Chicago Bears in May, 2007. He was on the practice squad of the Oakland Raiders during the 2007 season.

On November 24, 2008, James signed a contract with the Philadelphia Eagles to be on the practice squad.

=== Canadian Football League ===
James signed with the Hamilton Tiger-Cats on May 29, 2009. He played two seasons for the team.

== Life after football ==
James now works as a software engineer in Boise, Idaho.
