= 1920 Massachusetts gubernatorial election =

- November 2, 1920
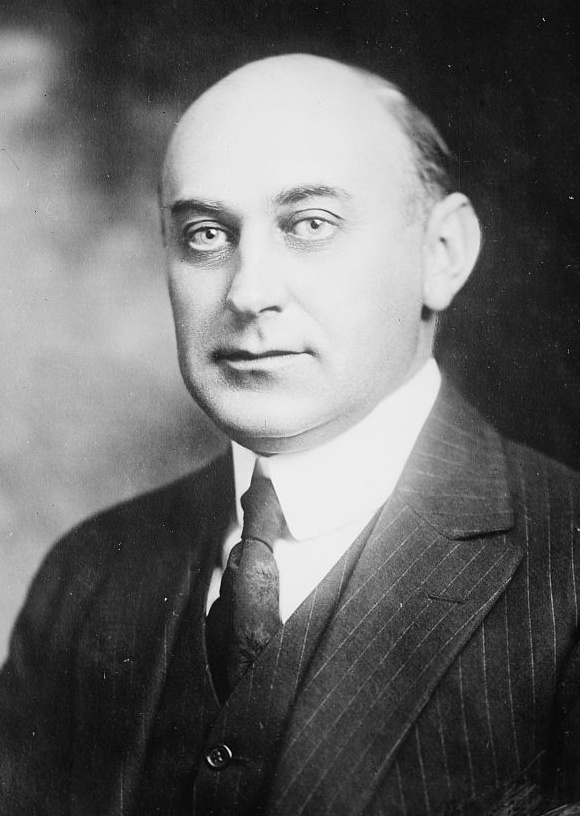

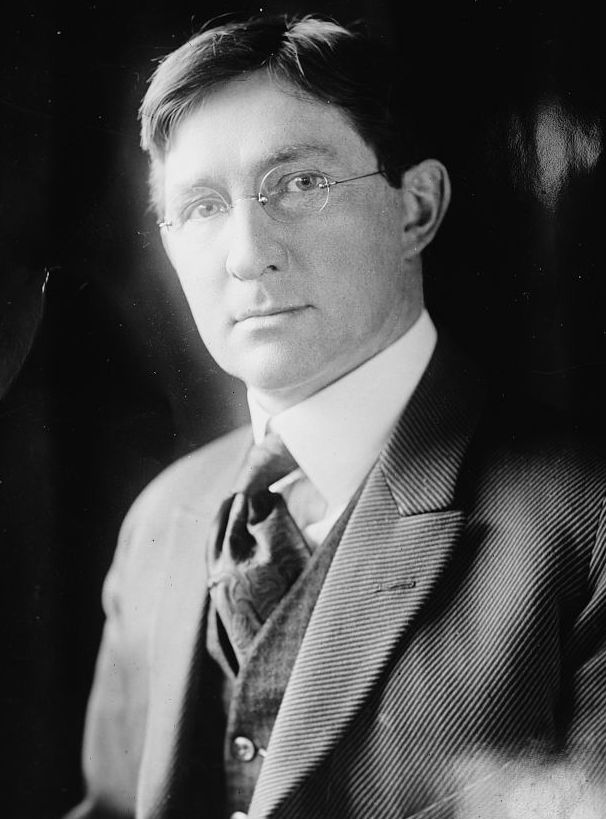
Nominee	Channing H. Cox	John Jackson Walsh
Party	Republican	Democratic
Popular vote	643,869	290,350
Percentage	67.02%	30.22%
- Cox: 40-50% 50–60% 60–70% 70–80% 80–90% >90% Walsh: 40-50% 50–60% 60–70%
Governor before election
Calvin Coolidge
Republican
Elected Governor
Channing H. Cox
Republican

The 1920 Massachusetts gubernatorial election was held on November 2, 1920. This was the first election in which the governor was elected to a two-year term, following the adoption of amendments to the state constitution proposed by the state constitutional convention of 1917–18.

== Republican primary ==
=== Governor ===
==== Candidates ====
- Channing H. Cox, incumbent lieutenant governor

===== Declined =====
- Calvin Coolidge, incumbent governor (nominated for vice president)

Lieutenant Governor Cox was unopposed for the nomination.

==== Results ====
Republican gubernatorial primary, 1920
Party	Candidate	Votes	%
Republican	Channing H. Cox	185,875	99.98%
Write-in	All others	43	0.02%
Total votes		185,918	100.00%

=== Lt. governor ===
==== Candidates ====
- Charles L. Burrill, treasurer and receiver-general
- Alvan T. Fuller, U.S. representative from Massachusetts's 9th congressional district
- Albert P. Langtry, secretary of the commonwealth
- Joseph E. Warner, speaker of the Massachusetts House of Representatives

==== Results ====
Congressman Alvan Fuller narrowly defeated Speaker of the State House Joseph Warner for the nomination.

Republican lt. gubernatorial primary, 1920
Party	Candidate	Votes	%
Republican	Alvan T. Fuller	58,556	28.31%
Republican	Joseph E. Warner	57,704	27.90%
Republican	Charles L. Burrill	52,039	25.16%
Republican	Albert P. Langtry	38,214	18.47%
Write-in	All others	347	0.17%
Total votes		206,860	100.00%

== Democratic primary ==
=== Governor ===
==== Candidates ====
- Richard H. Long, nominee for governor in 1918 and 1919
- John Jackson Walsh, state senator

==== Results ====
Democratic gubernatorial primary, 1920
Party	Candidate	Votes	%
Democratic	John Jackson Walsh	39,762	52.23%
Democratic	Richard H. Long	36,354	47.75%
Write-in	All others	10	0.01%
Total votes		76,126	100.00%

== General election ==
=== Results ===
Massachusetts gubernatorial election, 1920
Party	Candidate	Votes	%	±%
Republican	Channing H. Cox	643,869	67.02%	▲6.08
Democratic	John Jackson Walsh	290,350	30.22%	▼6.73
Socialist	Walter S. Hutchins	20,079	2.09%	▲0.74
Socialist Labor	Patrick Mulligan	6,383	0.66%	▲0.21
Write-in	All others	16	0.00%	Steady

== See also ==
- 1920 Massachusetts legislature

== Bibliography ==
- Office of the Secretary of the Commonwealth (1920). Election Statistics, 1920. Boston, MA.
