= R. H. Long Motors Company =

Defunct American motor vehicle manufacturer

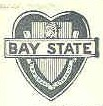
- Company type: Automobile manufacturing
- Industry: Automotive
- Founded: 1922
- Founder: Richard H. Long
- Defunct: 1926
- Headquarters: Framingham, Massachusetts, United States
- Area served: United States
- Products: Vehicles; Automotive parts

The R. H. Long Motors Company was a Framingham, Massachusetts-based automobile manufacturer that operated from 1922 to 1926. They produced the Bay State model automobile, which used a Continental Motors Company six-cylinder engine.

== History ==
The company was founded by Richard H. Long, a shoe manufacturer from Framingham. During World War I, Long's factory switched to manufacturing war supplies, including high-grade automobile bodies. In 1922, R. H. Long Motors Company began production of the Bay State.

=== The Bay State ===
The Bay State was a successful small-production car on a 121-inch wheelbase that featured a Continental six-cylinder engine and proven standard components. A former Winton Motor Carriage Company designed the car, which perhaps explains the similarity of the radiator shape. A complete line-up of models was produced, with open and closed models, including a sports phaeton. In its three or four years of production, some 2500 units of the Bay State were sold for prices ranging from $1,800 to $2,850.

== Fate ==
Although R. H. Long Motors ceased car production in 1926, the Long Automotive Group, an automobile dealership founded in 1927, was started from the remains of the business. Long Automotive still exists today in Southborough, Massachusetts (Long Cadillac), the world's oldest continually-owned Cadillac dealership, and Webster, Massachusetts (Long Subaru).

Two remaining Bay State cars, a 1925 roadster and a 1924 sedan Model One, are known to exist.

1922 advertisements for Long's Bay State models
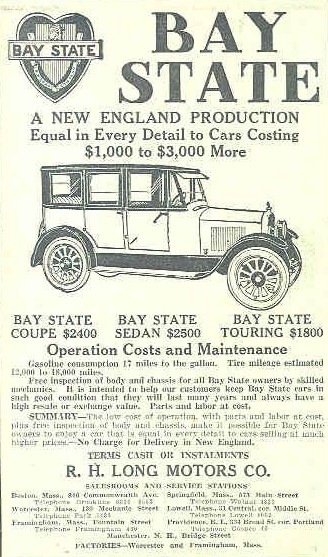
1922 Bay State advertisement with drawing

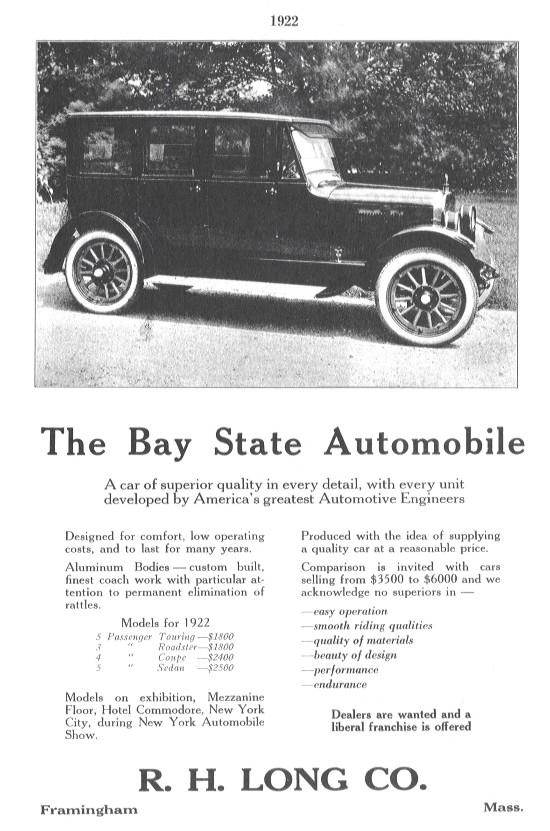
1922 Bay State advertisement with photo
