= John Jackson Walsh =

American politician

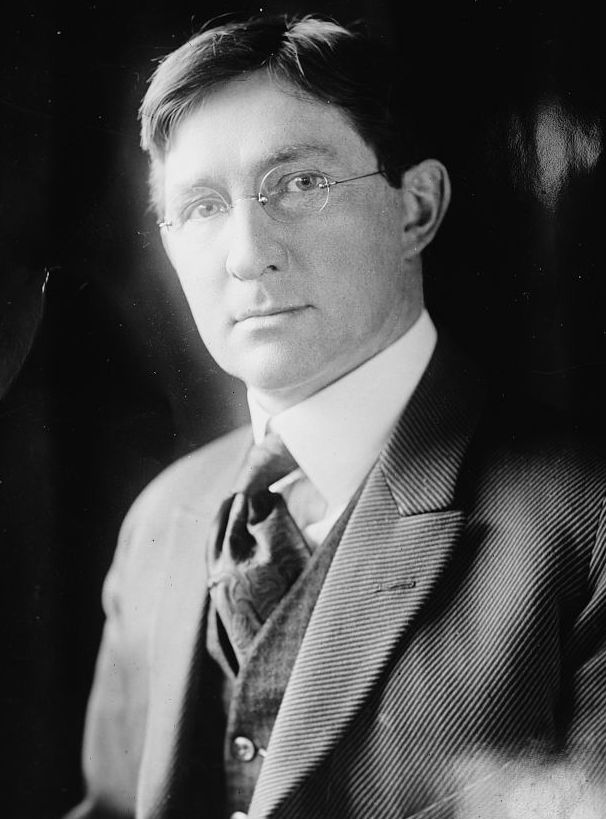
- Walsh circa 1922

Member of the Massachusetts Senate for the 8th Suffolk District
- In office 1919–1920
- Preceded by: Herman Hormel
- Succeeded by: George W. P. Babb

Personal details
- Born: March 31, 1871 Dublin
- Died: September 17, 1949 (aged 78) Boston
- Party: Democratic
- Education: Boston University School of Law
- Occupation: Lawyer

John Jackson Walsh (born John Joseph Walsh) was an American politician who served as a member of the Massachusetts Senate and was the Democratic nominee for Governor of Massachusetts in 1920.

== Early life ==
Walsh was born on March 31, 1871, in Dublin. His family moved to the United States when he was five years old. He worked as a newsboy, glass factory employee, bellhop, and office boy before studying law in the office of Patrick A. Collins. In 1892 he graduated from Boston University Law School and became a practicing attorney. He served as legal counsel for a number of labor unions and for several years was a temporary clerk of courts in Middlesex County, Massachusetts. Although he was born John Joseph Walsh he went by John Jackson Walsh to avoid confusion with a law school classmate. Walsh was married twice. His first marriage was annulled by the Roman Catholic Church on the grounds of "irreconcilable religious differences" (Walsh was a Catholic and his wife as a Protestant). He had two children with his first wife.

== Political career ==
Walsh was a member of the Citizen's Municipal League and supported James J. Storrow over John F. Fitzgerald in the 1910 Boston mayoral election. In 1911, Fitzgerald threatened to sue Walsh for statements he made before a legislative committee. In 1912, he was a candidate for the United States House of Representatives seat in Massachusetts's 10th congressional district but lost the Democratic nomination to William Francis Murray. In 1914, Fitzgerald appointed Walsh to the city planning board. From 1919 to 1920 Walsh represented the 8th Suffolk District in the Massachusetts. On June 17, 1920, Walsh announced that he would run for governor. He narrowly defeated 1918 and 1919 gubernatorial nominee Richard H. Long to win the Democratic nomination, but lost the general election to Republican Channing H. Cox 67% to 30%. In 1922, he ran for the United States Senate seat held by Henry Cabot Lodge. He finished third in the Democratic primary behind William A. Gaston and Sherman L. Whipple with 11% of the vote.

== Later life ==
In 1930, Walsh was appointed chairman of the General Council of the Massachusetts Bay Tercentenary.

On January 23, 1934, the Boston Bar Association filed a petition for Walsh's disbarment in the Massachusetts Supreme Judicial Court, alleging that he collected money for a client and failed to account for all of it. Judge Edward P. Pierce found Walsh guilty of a breech of trust for mixing $5,490 paid on a judgment with his own money so that it was not readily available to his client and gave the appearance that the money was his. He was suspended from the practice of law for one year.

Walsh died on September 17, 1949, of a heart attack at his home in Boston. He was 78 years old.

Party political offices
Preceded by Richard H. Long	Democratic nominee for Governor of Massachusetts; 1920	Succeeded by John F. Fitzgerald
