= Calvin Coolidge =

President of the United States from 1923 to 1929

- Coolidge in 1924

30th President of the United States
- In office August 2, 1923 – March 4, 1929
- Vice President: Vacant (1923–1925) (Note: Coolidge was vice president under Warren G. Harding and became president upon Harding's death on August 2, 1923. As this was before the Twenty-fifth Amendment to the United States Constitution was adopted in 1967, the vacancy was not filled until the next election and inauguration.); Charles G. Dawes (1925–1929)
- Preceded by: Warren G. Harding
- Succeeded by: Herbert Hoover

29th Vice President of the United States
- In office March 4, 1921 – August 2, 1923
- President: Warren G. Harding
- Preceded by: Thomas R. Marshall
- Succeeded by: Charles G. Dawes

48th Governor of Massachusetts
- In office January 2, 1919 – January 6, 1921
- Lieutenant: Channing H. Cox
- Preceded by: Samuel W. McCall
- Succeeded by: Channing H. Cox

46th Lieutenant Governor of Massachusetts
- In office January 6, 1916 – January 2, 1919
- Governor: Samuel W. McCall
- Preceded by: Grafton D. Cushing
- Succeeded by: Channing H. Cox

16th Mayor of Northampton
- In office January 3, 1910 – January 1, 1912
- Preceded by: James W. O'Brien
- Succeeded by: William Feiker
Legislative offices
President of the Massachusetts Senate
In office January 7, 1914 – January 6, 1916
Preceded by	Levi H. Greenwood
Succeeded by	Henry Gordon Wells
Member of the Massachusetts Senate
In office January 3, 1912 – January 6, 1916
Preceded by	Allen T. Treadway
Succeeded by	John B. Hull
Constituency	Berkshire, Hampden, and Hampshire counties
Member of the Massachusetts House of Representatives from the 1st Hampshire district
In office January 2, 1907 – January 6, 1909
Preceded by	Moses M. Bassett
Succeeded by	Charles A. Montgomery

Personal details
- Born: John Calvin Coolidge Jr. July 4, 1872 Plymouth Notch, Vermont, U.S.
- Died: January 5, 1933 (aged 60) Northampton, Massachusetts, U.S.
- Resting place: Plymouth Notch Cemetery
- Party: Republican
- Spouse: Grace Goodhue (m. 1905)
- Children: 2, including John
- Parent: John Calvin Coolidge Sr. (father)
- Relatives: Calvin Galusha Coolidge (grandfather); Park Pollard (cousin)
- Education: Amherst College (AB)
- Occupation: Politician; lawyer
- Other names: Wamblee-Tokaha
- Nickname: "Silent Cal"
- Calvin Coolidge's voice Coolidge speaking on government spending Recorded August 11, 1924

Calvin Coolidge (born John Calvin Coolidge Jr.; /ˈkuːlɪdʒ/ KOOL-ij; July 4, 1872 – January 5, 1933) was the 30th president of the United States, serving from 1923 to 1929. A Republican lawyer from Massachusetts, he served from 1921 to 1923 as the 29th vice president, under President Warren G. Harding, and from 1919 to 1921 as the 48th governor of Massachusetts. Coolidge gained a reputation as a small-government conservative, with a taciturn personality and dry sense of humor that earned him the nickname "Silent Cal".

Coolidge began his career as a member of the Massachusetts State House. He rose up the ranks of Massachusetts politics and was elected governor in 1918. As governor, Coolidge ran on the record of fiscal conservatism, strong support for women's suffrage, and vague opposition to Prohibition. Despite his tardy response, Coolidge's involvement in the Boston police strike in 1919 thrust him into the national spotlight as a man of decisive action. The following year, the Republican Party nominated Coolidge as the running mate to Senator Warren G. Harding in the 1920 presidential election, which they won in a landslide. Coolidge served as vice president until Harding's death in 1923, after which he assumed the presidency.

During his presidency, Coolidge restored public confidence in the White House after the Harding administration's many scandals. He signed into law the Indian Citizenship Act of 1924, which granted U.S. citizenship to all Native Americans, along with the Immigration Act of 1924, which aimed at limiting immigration from outside the Western Hemisphere and established the United States Border Patrol; and oversaw a period of rapid and expansive economic growth known as the "Roaring Twenties", leaving office with considerable popularity. Coolidge was known for his hands-off governing approach and pro-business stance; biographer Claude Fuess wrote: "He embodied the spirit and hopes of the middle class, could interpret their longings and express their opinions. That he did represent the genius of the average is the most convincing proof of his strength." Coolidge chose not to run again in 1928, remarking that ten years as president would be "longer than any other man has had it—too long!" (Note: Eleven years later, Franklin D. Roosevelt was elected to his third term and ultimately served over 12 years as president before he died in office.)

Coolidge is widely admired for his stalwart support of racial equality during a period of heightened racial tension, and he is highly regarded by advocates of smaller government and laissez-faire economics; supporters of an active central government generally view him far less favorably. His critics argue that he failed to use the country's economic boom to help struggling farmers and workers in other flailing industries, and there is still much debate among historians about the extent to which Coolidge's economic policies contributed to the onset of the Great Depression, which began seven months after he left office. Scholars consistently have ranked Coolidge in the lower half of U.S. presidents, however, such surveys since the 21st century have ranked him more mediocrely rather than assessing him as a failure.

== Early life and family history ==
John Calvin Coolidge Jr. was born on July 4, 1872, in Plymouth Notch, Vermont—the only U.S. president to be born on Independence Day. He was the elder of the two children of John Calvin Coolidge Sr. and Victoria Josephine Moor. Although named for his father, from early childhood Coolidge was addressed by his middle name. The name Calvin was used in multiple generations of the Coolidge family, apparently selected in honor of John Calvin, the Protestant Reformer, with Coolidge describing his ancestors as "English Puritan stock" in his Autobiography.

Coolidge's earliest American ancestor, John Coolidge, emigrated from Cottenham, Cambridgeshire, England, around 1630 and settled in Watertown, Massachusetts. Coolidge also descended from Samuel Appleton, who settled in Ipswich and led the Massachusetts Bay Colony during King Philip's War. Coolidge's great-great-grandfather, another John Coolidge, was an American military officer in the Revolutionary War and one of the first selectmen of the town of Plymouth.

His grandfather Calvin Galusha Coolidge served in the Vermont House of Representatives. His cousin Park Pollard was a businessman in Cavendish, Vermont, and the longtime chair of the Vermont Democratic Party. Coolidge's mother was the daughter of Hiram Dunlap Moor, a Plymouth Notch farmer, and Abigail Franklin.

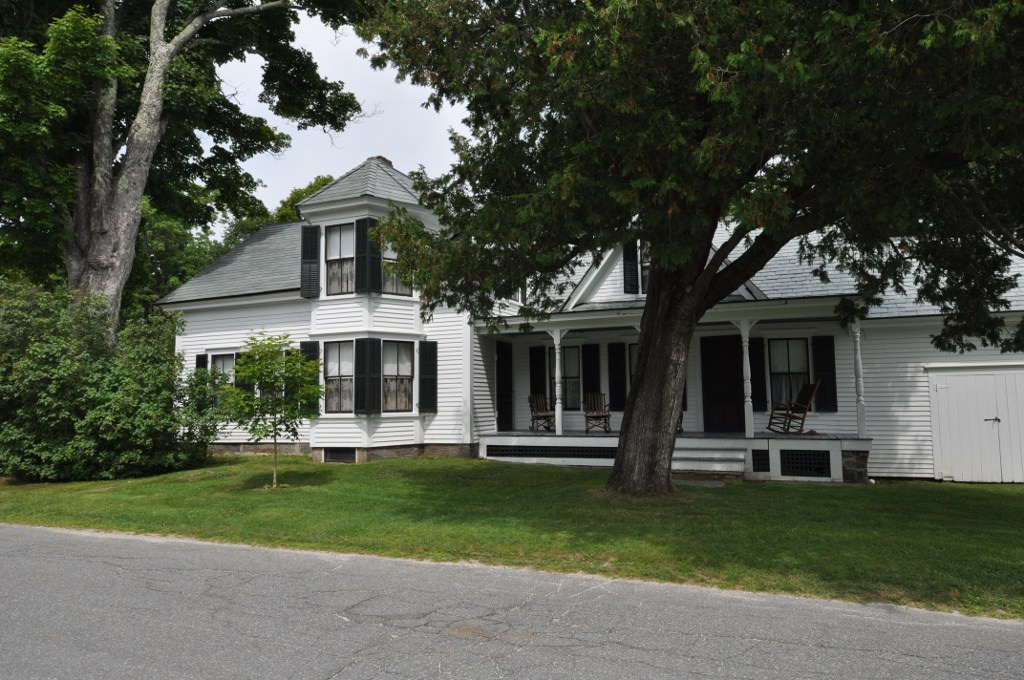
The Coolidge Homestead in Plymouth Notch, Vermont

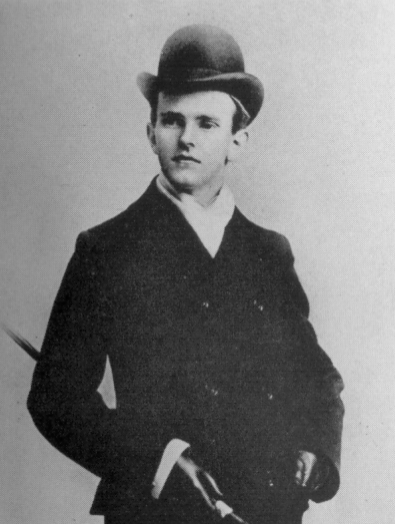
Coolidge as an Amherst College undergraduate

Coolidge Senior engaged in many occupations and developed a statewide reputation as a prosperous farmer, storekeeper, and public servant. He held various local offices, including justice of the peace and tax collector and served in both houses of the Vermont General Assembly. When Coolidge was 12 years old, his chronically ill mother died at the age of 39, perhaps from tuberculosis. His younger sister, Abigail Grace Coolidge (1875–1890), died at the age of 15, probably of appendicitis, when Coolidge was 18. Coolidge's father married a Plymouth schoolteacher in 1891, and lived to the age of 80.

== Early career and marriage ==
=== Education and law practice ===
Coolidge attended the Black River Academy and then St. Johnsbury Academy before enrolling at Amherst College, where he distinguished himself in the debating class. As a senior, he joined the Phi Gamma Delta fraternity and graduated cum laude. While at Amherst, Coolidge was profoundly influenced by philosophy professor Charles Edward Garman, a Congregational mystic who had a neo-Hegelian philosophy. Coolidge explained Garman's ethics forty years later:

[T]here is a standard of righteousness that might does not make right, that the end does not justify the means, and that expediency as a working principle is bound to fail. The only hope of perfecting human relationships is in accordance with the law of service under which men are not so solicitous about what they shall get as they are about what they shall give. Yet people are entitled to the rewards of their industry. What they earn is theirs, no matter how small or how great. But the possession of property carries the obligation to use it in a larger service.

At his father's urging after graduation, Coolidge moved to Northampton, Massachusetts, to become a lawyer. Coolidge followed the common practice of apprenticing with a local law firm, Hammond & Field, and reading law with them. John C. Hammond and Henry P. Field, both Amherst graduates, introduced Coolidge to practicing law in the county seat of Hampshire County, Massachusetts. In 1897, Coolidge was admitted to the Massachusetts bar, becoming a country lawyer. With his savings and a small inheritance from his grandfather, Coolidge opened his own law office in Northampton in 1898. He practiced commercial law, believing that he served his clients best by staying out of court. As his reputation as a hard-working and diligent attorney grew, local banks and other businesses began to retain his services.

=== Marriage and family ===
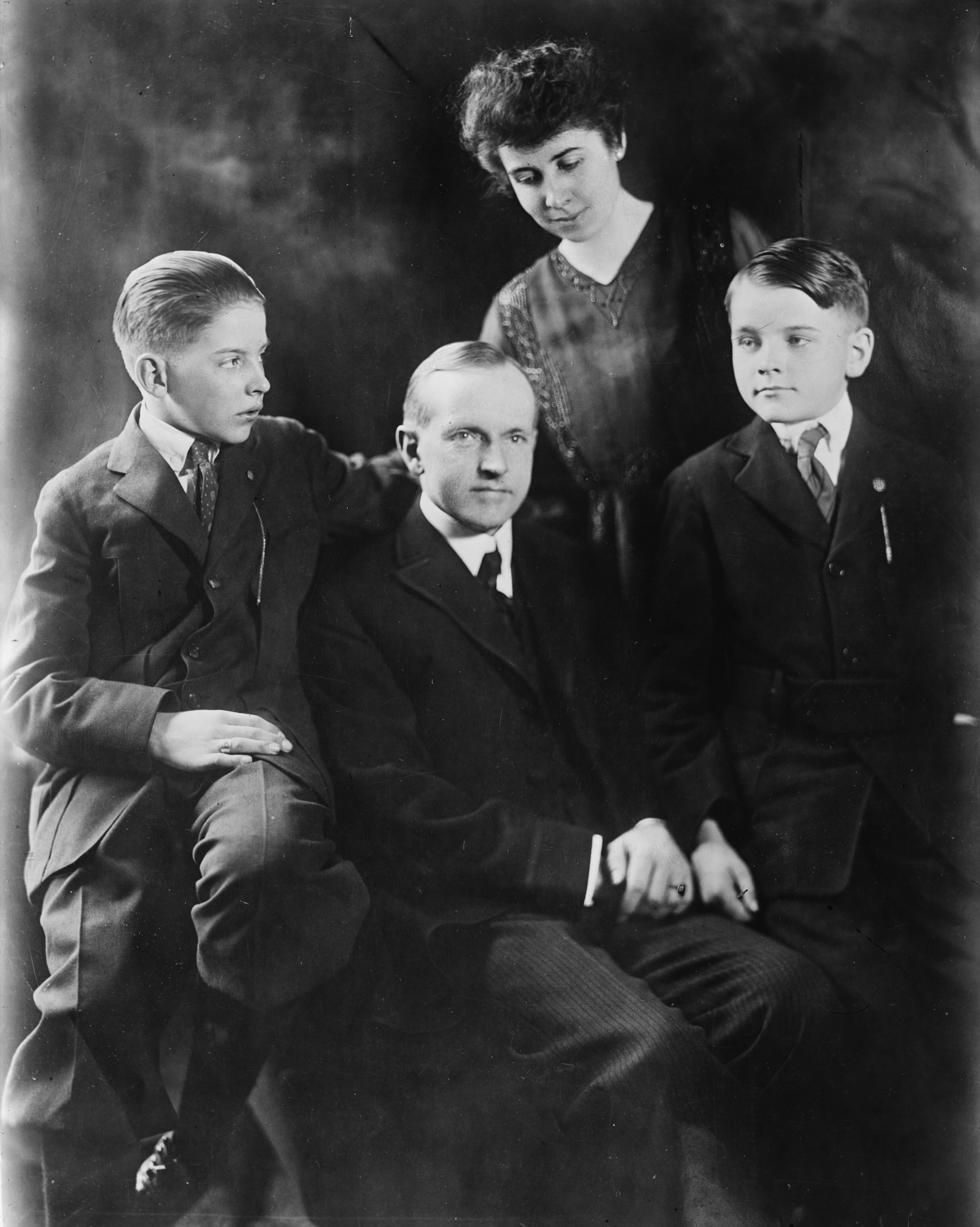
Coolidge with his family, c. 1915. John is left of his father and Calvin Jr. is right of Grace.

In 1903, Coolidge met Grace Goodhue, a graduate of the University of Vermont and a teacher at Northampton's Clarke School for the Deaf. They married on October 4, 1905, at 2:30 p.m. in a small ceremony which took place in the parlor of Grace's family's house, having overcome her mother's objections to the marriage. The newlyweds went on a honeymoon trip to Montreal, originally planned for two weeks but cut short by a week at Coolidge's request. After 25 years he wrote of Grace, "for almost a quarter of a century she has borne with my infirmities and I have rejoiced in her graces".

The Coolidges had two sons: John (1906–2000) and Calvin Jr. (1908–1924). On June 30, 1924, Calvin Jr. played tennis with his brother on the White House tennis courts without putting on socks and developed a blister on one of his toes. The blister subsequently degenerated into sepsis. He died a little over a week later at the age of 16.

Coolidge never forgave himself for Calvin Jr's death. His elder son John said it "hurt [Coolidge] terribly", and psychiatric biographer Robert E. Gilbert, author of The Tormented President: Calvin Coolidge, Death, and Clinical Depression, said that Coolidge "ceased to function as President after the death of his sixteen-year-old son". Gilbert writes that after Calvin Jr.'s death Coolidge displayed all ten of the symptoms the American Psychiatric Association lists as evidence of major depressive disorder. John later became a railroad executive, helped start the Coolidge Foundation, and was instrumental in creating the President Calvin Coolidge State Historic Site.

Coolidge was frugal, and when it came to securing a home, he insisted upon renting. He and his wife attended Northampton's Edwards Congregational Church before and after his presidency.

== Local political office (1898−1915) ==
=== City offices ===
The Republican Party was dominant in New England at the time, and Coolidge followed the example of Hammond and Field by becoming active in local politics. In 1896, Coolidge campaigned for Republican presidential candidate William McKinley, and was selected to be a member of the Republican City Committee the next year. In 1898, he won election to the City Council of Northampton, placing second in a ward where the top three candidates were elected. The position offered no salary but provided Coolidge with valuable political experience.

In 1899, the city council made Coolidge city solicitor. He was elected to a one-year term in 1900 and reelected in 1901. This position gave Coolidge more experience as a lawyer and paid a salary of $600 (equivalent to $23,220 in 2025). In 1902, the city council selected a Democrat for city solicitor, and Coolidge returned to private practice. Soon thereafter, the clerk of courts for the county died, and Coolidge was chosen to replace him. The position paid well, but it barred him from practicing law, so he remained at the job for only a year.

In 1904, Coolidge suffered his sole defeat at the ballot box, losing an election to the Northampton school board. When told that some of his neighbors voted against him because he had no children in the schools he would govern, the recently married Coolidge replied, "Might give me time!"

=== Massachusetts state legislator and mayor ===
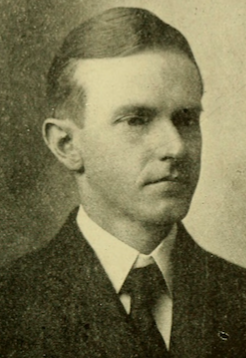
Coolidge as a state representative, 1908

In 1906, the local Republican committee nominated Coolidge for election to the Massachusetts House of Representatives. He won a close victory over the incumbent Democrat, and reported to Boston for the 1907 session of the Massachusetts General Court. In his freshman term, Coolidge served on minor committees and, although he usually voted with the party, was known as a Progressive Republican, voting in favor of such measures as women's suffrage and the direct election of Senators.

While in Boston, Coolidge became an ally, and then a faithful supporter, of then U.S. Senator Winthrop Murray Crane, who controlled the Massachusetts Republican Party's western faction; Crane's party rival in eastern Massachusetts was U.S. Senator Henry Cabot Lodge. Coolidge forged another key strategic alliance with Guy Currier, who had served in both state houses and had the social distinction, wealth, personal charm, and broad circle of friends Coolidge lacked, and which had a lasting impact on his political career. In 1907, Coolidge was reelected. In the 1908 session he was more outspoken, though not in a leadership position.

Instead of vying for another term in the State House, Coolidge returned home to his growing family and ran for mayor of Northampton when the incumbent Democrat retired. He was well liked in the town, and defeated his challenger by a vote of 1,597 to 1,409. During his first term from 1910 to 1911, he increased teachers' salaries and retired some of the city's debt while still managing to effect a slight tax decrease. In 1911, he was renominated and defeated the same opponent by a slightly larger margin.

In 1911, the State Senator for the Hampshire County area retired and successfully encouraged Coolidge to run for his seat for the 1912 session. Coolidge defeated his Democratic opponent by a large margin. At the start of that term, he became chairman of a committee to arbitrate the "Bread and Roses" strike by the workers of the American Woolen Company in Lawrence, Massachusetts. (Note: See also the main article, Lawrence textile strike, for a full description.) After two tense months, the company agreed to the workers' demands, in a settlement proposed by the committee.

A major issue affecting Massachusetts Republicans in 1912 was the party split between the progressive wing, which favored Theodore Roosevelt, and the conservative wing, which favored William Howard Taft. Although he favored some progressive measures, Coolidge refused to leave the Republican party. When the new Progressive Party declined to run a candidate in his state senate district, Coolidge won reelection against his Democratic opponent by an increased margin.

Do the day's work. If it be to protect the rights of the weak, whoever objects, do it. If it be to help a powerful corporation better to serve the people, whatever the opposition, do that. Expect to be called a stand-patter, but don't be a stand-patter. Expect to be called a demagogue, but don't be a demagogue. Don't hesitate to be as revolutionary as science. Don't hesitate to be as reactionary as the multiplication table. Don't expect to build up the weak by pulling down the strong. Don't hurry to legislate. Give administration a chance to catch up with legislation.

— "Have Faith in Massachusetts" as delivered by Calvin Coolidge to the Massachusetts State Senate, 1914

In the 1913 session, Coolidge enjoyed renowned success in arduously navigating to passage the Western Trolley Act, which connected Northampton with a dozen similar industrial communities in Western Massachusetts.

Coolidge intended to retire after his second term, as was customary, but when the president of the state senate, Levi H. Greenwood, considered running for lieutenant governor, Coolidge decided to run for the Senate again in hopes of being elected its presiding officer. Greenwood later decided to run for reelection to the Senate, and was defeated primarily due to his opposition to women's suffrage.

Coolidge was in favor of the women's vote, and was reelected. With Crane's help, Coolidge assumed the presidency of a closely divided Senate. After his election in November 1913, Coolidge delivered a published and frequently quoted speech, Have Faith in Massachusetts, which summarized his philosophy of government.

Coolidge's speech was well received, and he attracted some admirers on its account. Towards the end of the term, many of them were proposing Coolidge's name for nomination to lieutenant governor. After winning reelection to the Senate by an increased margin in the 1914 elections, Coolidge was reelected unanimously to be President of the Senate. Coolidge's supporters, led by fellow Amherst alumnus Frank Stearns, encouraged him again to run for lieutenant governor. Stearns, an executive with the Boston department store R. H. Stearns, became another key ally, and began a publicity campaign on Coolidge's behalf before he announced his candidacy at the end of the 1915 legislative session.

== Lieutenant Governor and Governor of Massachusetts (1916−1921) ==
Coolidge entered the primary election for lieutenant governor and was nominated to run alongside gubernatorial candidate Samuel W. McCall. Coolidge was the leading vote-getter in the Republican primary, and balanced the Republican ticket by adding a western presence to McCall's eastern base of support. McCall and Coolidge won the 1915 election to their respective one-year terms, with Coolidge defeating his opponent by more than 50,000 votes.

In Massachusetts, the lieutenant governor does not preside over the state Senate, as is the case in many other states; nevertheless, as lieutenant governor, Coolidge was a deputy governor functioning as an administrative inspector and was a member of the governor's council. He was also chairman of the finance committee and the pardons committee. As a full-time elected official, Coolidge discontinued his law practice in 1916, though his family continued to live in Northampton. McCall and Coolidge were both reelected in 1916 and in 1917. When McCall decided that he would not stand for a fourth term, Coolidge announced his intention to run for governor.

=== 1918 election ===
Coolidge was unopposed for the Republican nomination for governor of Massachusetts in 1918. He and his running mate, Channing Cox, a Boston lawyer and Speaker of the Massachusetts House of Representatives, ran on the previous administration's record: fiscal conservatism, a vague opposition to Prohibition, support for women's suffrage, and support for American involvement in World War I. The issue of the war proved divisive, especially among Irish and German Americans. Coolidge was elected by a margin of 16,773 votes over his opponent, Richard H. Long, in the smallest margin of victory of any of his statewide campaigns.

=== Boston police strike ===
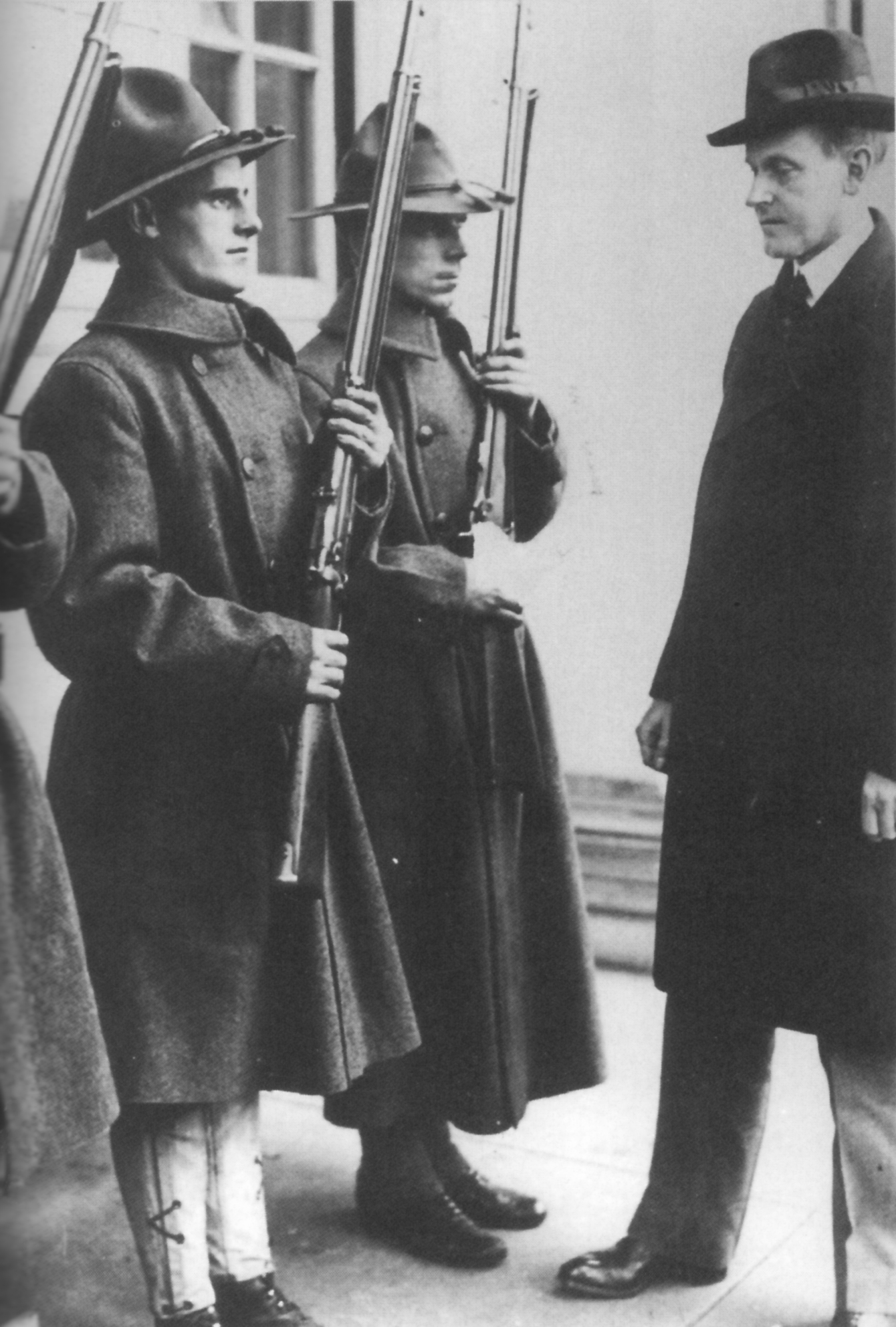
Coolidge inspects militia during the 1919 Boston police strike.

In 1919, in reaction to a plan of the policemen of the Boston Police Department to register with a union, Police Commissioner Edwin U. Curtis announced that such an act would not be tolerated. In August of that year, the American Federation of Labor (AFL) issued a charter to the Boston Police Union. Curtis declared the union's leaders were guilty of insubordination and would be relieved of duty, but indicated he would cancel their suspension if the union was dissolved by September 4. The mayor of Boston, Andrew Peters, convinced Curtis to delay his action for a few days, but with no results, and Curtis suspended the union leaders on September 8. The following day, about three-quarters of the policemen in Boston went on strike. (Note: The exact total was 1,117 out of 1,544.)

Tacitly in support of Curtis's position, Coolidge closely monitored the situation, initially deferring to the local authorities. Sensitive to public pressure, Coolidge refused to get involved due to the upcoming gubernatorial election as well as questions of jurisdiction. That night and the next, there was sporadic violence and rioting in the city. Concerned about sympathy strikes by the firemen and others, Peters called up some units of the Massachusetts National Guard stationed in the Boston area pursuant to an old and obscure legal authority and relieved Curtis of duty.

Coolidge, sensing the severity of circumstances were then in need of his intervention, conferred with Crane's operative, William Butler, and Curtis's legal adviser Herbert Parker, and then acted. He called up more units of the National Guard, restored Curtis to office, and took personal control of the police force. Curtis proclaimed that all of the strikers were fired from their jobs, and Coolidge called for a new police force to be recruited. That night Coolidge received a telegram from AFL leader Samuel Gompers. "Whatever disorder has occurred", Gompers wrote, "is due to Curtis's order in which the right of the policemen has been denied".

Coolidge publicly answered Gompers's telegram, denying any justification whatsoever for the strike—and his response launched him into the national consciousness. Newspapers nationwide picked up on Coolidge's statement and he became the strike's opponents' newest hero. Amid the First Red Scare, many Americans were terrified of the spread of communist revolutions like those in Russia, Hungary, and Germany. Coolidge had lost some friends among organized labor, but conservatives saw a rising star. Although he usually acted with deliberation, the Boston police strike gave Coolidge a national reputation as a decisive leader and strict enforcer of law and order.

Your assertion that the Commissioner was wrong cannot justify the wrong of leaving the city unguarded. That furnished the opportunity; the criminal element furnished the action. There is no right to strike against the public safety by anyone, anywhere, any time. ... I am equally determined to defend the sovereignty of Massachusetts and to maintain the authority and jurisdiction over her public officers where it has been placed by the Constitution and laws of her people.

— Telegram from Governor Calvin Coolidge to Samuel Gompers, September 14, 1919

=== 1919 election ===
Coolidge and Cox were renominated for their respective offices in 1919. By this time Coolidge's supporters, especially Stearns, had publicized his actions in the Police Strike around the state and the nation, and some of Coolidge's speeches were published in book form. He faced the same opponent as in 1918, Richard Long, but this time Coolidge defeated him by 125,101 votes, more than seven times his margin of victory from a year earlier. (Note: The tally was Coolidge 317,774, Long 192,673.) His actions in the police strike, combined with the massive electoral victory, led to suggestions that Coolidge run for president in 1920.

=== Legislation and vetoes as governor ===
By the time Coolidge was inaugurated on January 2, 1919, the First World War had ended, and Coolidge pushed the legislature to give a $100 bonus (equivalent to $1,857 in 2025) to Massachusetts veterans. He signed a bill reducing the work week for women and children from 54 hours to 48, saying, "We must humanize the industry, or the system will break down." He passed a budget that kept the tax rates the same, while trimming $4 million from expenditures, allowing the state to retire some of its debt.

Coolidge wielded the veto pen as governor. His most publicized veto prevented an increase in legislators' pay by 50%. Although he was personally opposed to Prohibition, he vetoed a bill in May 1920 that would have allowed the sale of beer or wine of 2.75% alcohol or less, in Massachusetts in violation of the Eighteenth Amendment to the United States Constitution. "Opinions and instructions do not outmatch the Constitution," he said in his veto message. "Against it, they are void."

== Vice presidency (1921–1923) ==
=== 1920 election ===
At the 1920 Republican National Convention, most of the delegates were selected by state party caucuses, not primaries. As such, the field was divided among many local favorites. Coolidge was one such candidate, and while he placed as high as sixth in the voting, the powerful party bosses running the convention, primarily the party's U.S. Senators, never considered him seriously. After ten ballots, the bosses and then the delegates settled on Senator Warren G. Harding of Ohio as their nominee for president.

When the time came to select a vice-presidential nominee, the bosses also announced their choice, Senator Irvine Lenroot of Wisconsin, and then departed after his name was put forth, relying on the rank and file to confirm their decision. A delegate from Oregon, Wallace McCamant, had read Have Faith in Massachusetts and proposed Coolidge for vice president instead. The suggestion caught on quickly, with the masses craving an act of independence from the absent bosses, and Coolidge was unexpectedly nominated.

The Democrats nominated another Ohioan, James M. Cox, for president and the Assistant Secretary of the Navy, Franklin D. Roosevelt, for vice president. The question of the United States joining the League of Nations was a major issue in the campaign, as was the unfinished legacy of Progressivism. Harding ran a "front-porch" campaign from his home in Marion, Ohio, but Coolidge took to the campaign trail in the Upper South, New York, and New England. His audiences were carefully limited to those familiar with Coolidge and those placing a premium upon concise and short speeches; Coolidge said "I can't make an engaging, rousing or oratorical speech". On November 2, 1920, Harding and Coolidge were victorious in a landslide, winning more than 60 percent of the popular vote, including every state outside the South. They won in Tennessee, the first time a Republican ticket had won a Southern state since Reconstruction.

=== "Silent Cal" ===
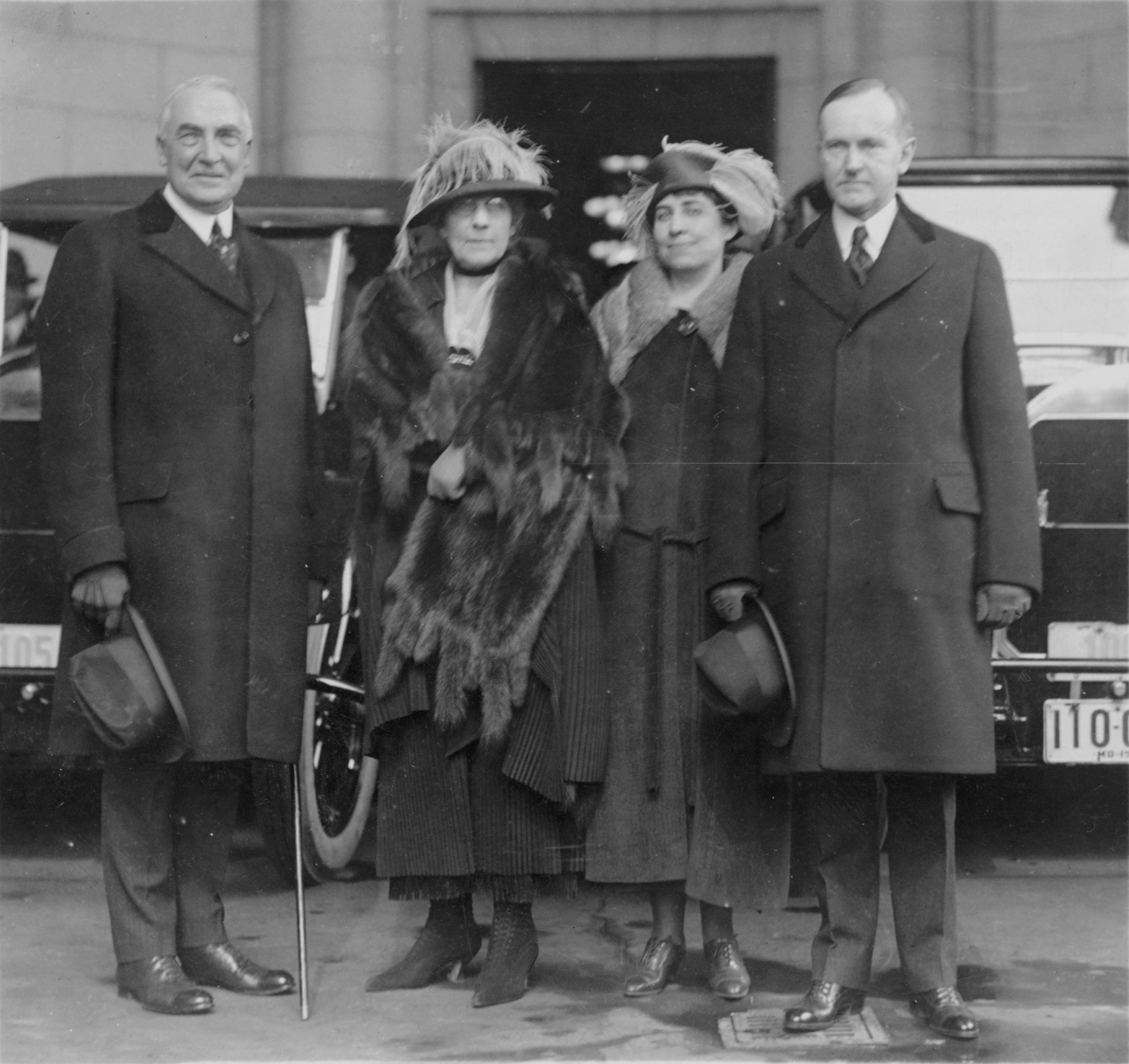
President Harding and Vice President Coolidge with their wives

The vice presidency did not carry many official duties, but Harding invited Coolidge to attend cabinet meetings, making him the first vice president to do so. He gave a number of unremarkable speeches around the country.

As vice president, Coolidge and his vivacious wife Grace were invited to quite a few parties, where the legend of "Silent Cal" was born. It is from this time that most of the jokes and anecdotes involving Coolidge originate, such as Coolidge being "silent in five languages". Although Coolidge was known to be a skilled and effective public speaker, in private he was a man of few words and was commonly referred to as "Silent Cal".

An apocryphal story has it that a person seated next to Coolidge at a dinner told him, "I made a bet today that I could get more than two words out of you", to which Coolidge replied, "You lose". On April 22, 1924, Coolidge said that the "You lose" incident never occurred. The story was related by Frank B. Noyes, President of the Associated Press, to its membership at its annual luncheon at the Waldorf Astoria Hotel, when toasting and introducing Coolidge, the invited speaker. After the introduction and before his prepared remarks, Coolidge told the membership, "Your President [Noyes] has given you a perfect example of one of those rumors now current in Washington which is without any foundation."

Coolidge often seemed uncomfortable among fashionable Washington society. When asked why he continued to attend so many of their dinner parties, he replied, "Got to eat somewhere." Alice Roosevelt Longworth, a leading Republican wit, underscored Coolidge's silence and his dour personality: "When he wished he were elsewhere, he pursed his lips, folded his arms, and said nothing. He looked then precisely as though he had been weaned on a pickle." Coolidge and his wife, Grace, who was a great baseball fan, once attended a Washington Senators game and sat through all nine innings without saying a word, except once when he asked her the time.

As president, Coolidge's reputation as a quiet man continued. "The words of a President have an enormous weight," he later wrote, "and ought not to be used indiscriminately." Coolidge was aware of his stiff reputation, and cultivated it. "I think the American people want a solemn ass as a President," he once told Ethel Barrymore, "and I think I will go along with them." Some historians suggest that Coolidge's image was created deliberately as a campaign tactic. Others believe his withdrawn and quiet behavior was natural, deepening after the death of his son in 1924. Dorothy Parker, upon learning that Coolidge had died, reportedly remarked, "How can they tell?"

== Presidency (1923–1929) ==
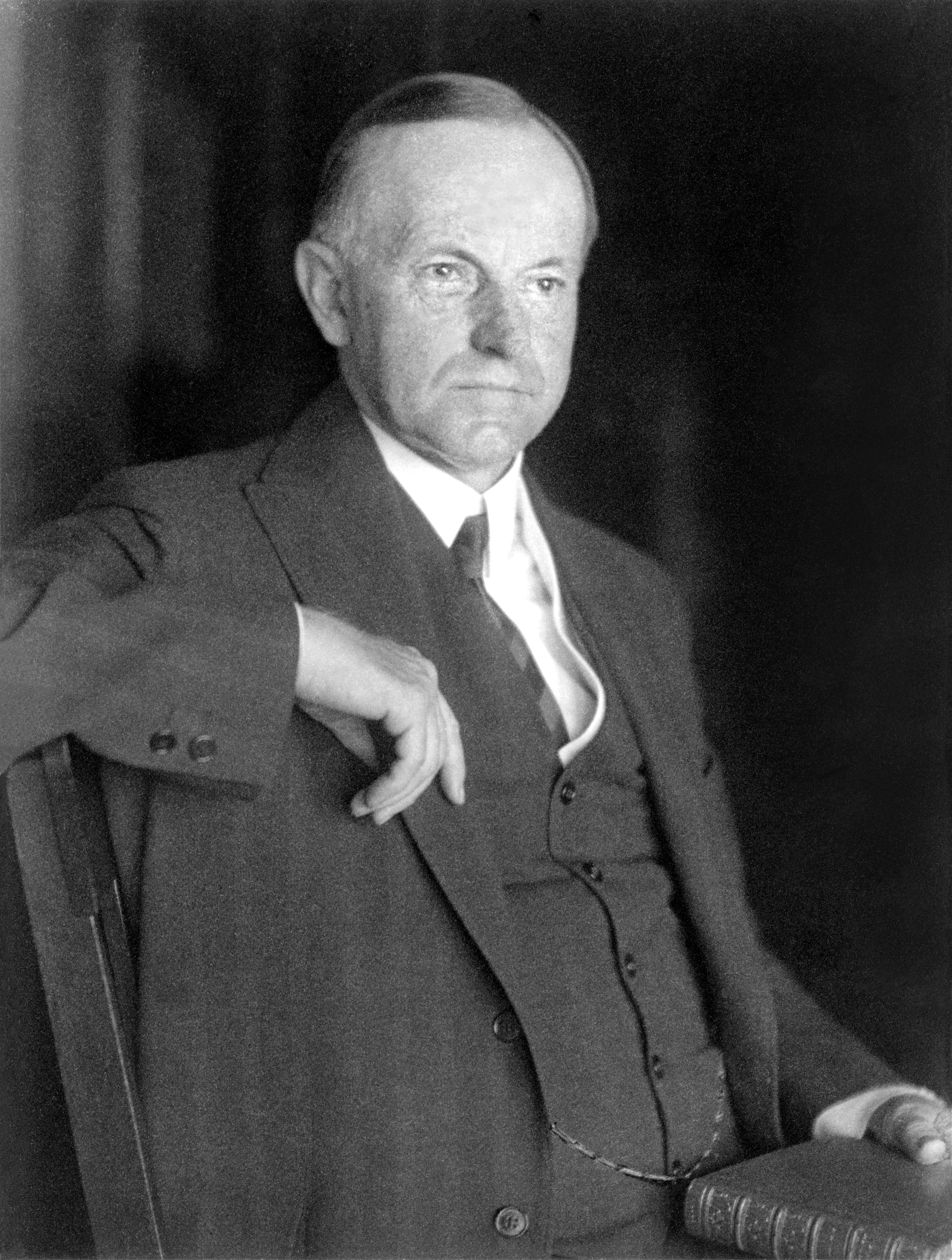
President Coolidge c. 1924, portrait by Doris Ulmann

On August 2, 1923, President Harding died unexpectedly from a heart attack in San Francisco while on a speaking tour of the western United States. Vice President Coolidge was in Vermont visiting his family home, which had neither electricity nor a telephone, when he received word by messenger of Harding's death. Coolidge dressed, said a prayer, and came downstairs to greet the reporters who had assembled. His father, a notary public and justice of the peace, administered the oath of office in the family's parlor by the light of a kerosene lamp at 2:47 a.m. on August 3, 1923, whereupon the new President of the United States returned to bed.

Coolidge returned to Washington the next day, and was sworn in again by Justice Adolph A. Hoehling Jr. of the Supreme Court of the District of Columbia, to forestall any questions about the authority of a state official to administer a federal oath. This second oath-taking remained a secret until it was revealed by Harry M. Daugherty in 1932, and confirmed by Hoehling. When Hoehling confirmed Daugherty's story, he indicated that Daugherty, then serving as United States Attorney General, asked him to administer the oath without fanfare at the Willard Hotel. According to Hoehling, he did not question Daugherty's reason for requesting a second oath-taking but assumed it was to resolve any doubt about whether the first swearing-in was valid.

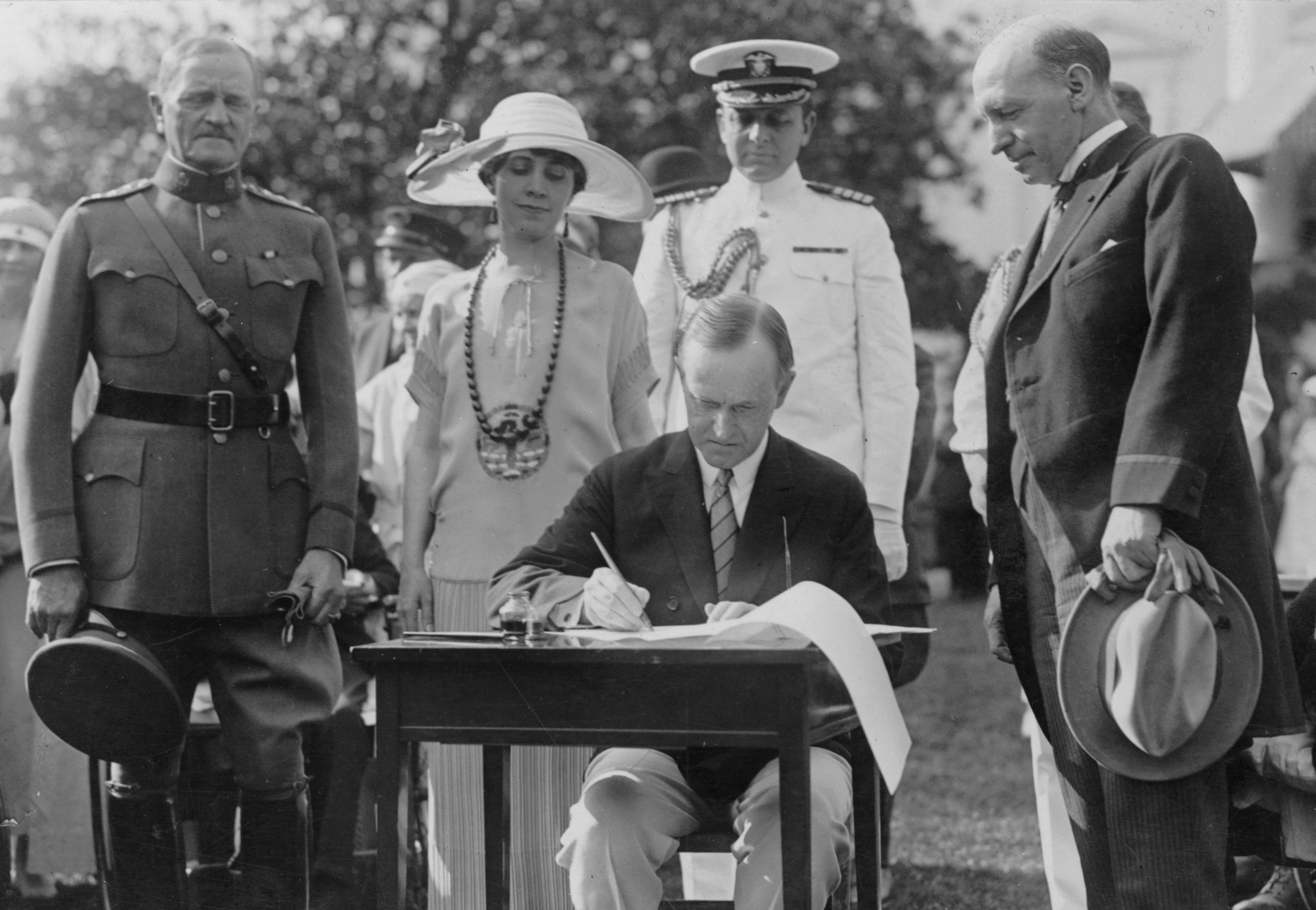
President Coolidge signing appropriation bills for the Veterans Bureau, June 1924

The nation initially did not know what to make of Coolidge, who had maintained a low profile in the Harding administration. Many had even expected him to be replaced on the ballot in 1924. Coolidge believed that those of Harding's men under suspicion were entitled to every presumption of innocence, taking a methodical approach to the scandals, principally the Teapot Dome scandal, while others clamored for rapid punishment of those they presumed guilty.

Coolidge thought the Senate investigations of the scandals would suffice. The resulting resignations of those involved affirmed this. He personally intervened in demanding the resignation of Attorney General Harry M. Daugherty after Daugherty refused to cooperate with the investigations. He then set about to confirm that no loose ends remained in the administration, arranging for a full briefing on the wrongdoing. Harry A. Slattery reviewed the facts with him, Harlan F. Stone analyzed the legal aspects for him, and Senator William E. Borah assessed and presented the political factors.

On December 6, 1923, Coolidge addressed Congress when it reconvened, giving a speech that supported many of Harding's policies, including Harding's formal budgeting process, the enforcement of immigration restrictions, and the arbitration of coal strikes ongoing in Pennsylvania.

The address to Congress was the first presidential speech to be broadcast over the radio. The Washington Naval Treaty was proclaimed one month into Coolidge's term, and was generally well received nationally. In May 1924, Congress passed the World War I veterans' World War Adjusted Compensation Act ("Bonus Bill"), overriding Coolidge's veto. Later that year, Coolidge signed the Immigration Act, which was aimed at restricting southern and eastern European immigration, but appended a signing statement expressing his unhappiness with the bill's specific exclusion of Japanese immigrants.

Just before the Republican Convention began, Coolidge signed into law the Revenue Act of 1924, which reduced the top marginal tax rate from 58% to 46%, cut personal income tax rates across the board, increased the estate tax, and bolstered it with a new gift tax.

On June 2, 1924, Coolidge signed the act granting citizenship to all Native Americans born in the United States. By that time, two-thirds of them were already citizens, having gained it through marriage, military service (veterans of World War I were granted citizenship in 1919), or land allotments.

On August 4, 1927, Coolidge was adopted into the Sioux tribe under the name Wamblee-Tokaha (English: Leading Eagle). He was named White Chief and Protector of the Indians by Henry Standing Bear.

=== 1924 election ===
1924 electoral vote results

The Republican Convention was held from June 10 to 12, 1924, in Cleveland, Ohio. Coolidge was nominated on the first ballot. The convention nominated Frank Lowden of Illinois for vice president on the second ballot, but he declined. Former Brigadier General Charles G. Dawes was nominated on the third ballot and accepted.

The Democrats held their convention the next month in New York City. The convention soon deadlocked, and after 103 ballots, the delegates agreed upon a compromise candidate, John W. Davis, with Charles W. Bryan nominated for vice president. The Democrats' hopes were buoyed when Robert M. La Follette, a Republican senator from Wisconsin, split from the GOP to form a new Progressive Party. Many believed that the split in the Republican Party, like the one in 1912, would allow a Democrat to win the presidency.

After the conventions and the death of his younger son Calvin, Coolidge became withdrawn. He later said that "when he [the son] died, the power and glory of the Presidency went with him." Even as he mourned, Coolidge ran his standard campaign, not mentioning his opponents by name or maligning them, and delivering speeches on his theory of government, including several that were broadcast over the radio.

It was the most subdued campaign since 1896, partly because of Coolidge's grief, but also because of his naturally non-confrontational style. The other candidates campaigned in a more modern fashion, but despite the split in the Republican party, the results were similar to those of 1920. Coolidge won every state outside the South except Wisconsin, La Follette's home state. He won the election with 382 electoral votes and the popular vote by 2.5 million votes.

=== Industry and trade ===
"[I]t is probable that a press which maintains an intimate touch with the business currents of the nation is likely to be more reliable than it would be if it were a stranger to these influences. After all, the chief business of the American people is business. They are profoundly concerned with buying, selling, investing and prospering in the world.

— "President Calvin Coolidge's address to the American Society of Newspaper Editors", Washington D.C., January 25, 1925

During Coolidge's presidency, the United States experienced a period of rapid economic growth known as the "Roaring Twenties". He left the administration's industrial policy in the hands of his activist Secretary of Commerce, Herbert Hoover, who energetically used government auspices to promote business efficiency and develop airlines and radio.

Coolidge disdained regulation and appointed men to the Federal Trade Commission and the Interstate Commerce Commission, who did little to restrict the activities of businesses under their jurisdiction. The regulatory state under Coolidge was, as one biographer called it, "thin to the point of invisibility".

Historian Robert Sobel offers some context for Coolidge's laissez-faire ideology, based on the prevailing understanding of federalism during his presidency: "As Governor of Massachusetts, Coolidge supported wages and hours legislation, opposed child labor, imposed economic controls during World War I, favored safety measures in factories, and even worker representation on corporate boards. Did he support these measures while president? No, because in the 1920s, such matters were considered the responsibilities of state and local governments."

Coolidge signed the Radio Act of 1927, which established the Federal Radio Commission and the equal-time rule for radio broadcasters and restricted radio broadcasting licenses to stations that demonstrated they served "the public interest, convenience, or necessity".

=== Taxation and government spending ===
Coolidge adopted the taxation policies of his Secretary of the Treasury, Andrew Mellon, who advocated "scientific taxation"—the notion that lowering taxes will increase, rather than decrease, government receipts. Congress agreed, and tax rates were reduced in Coolidge's term.

In addition to federal tax cuts, Coolidge proposed reductions in federal expenditures and retiring the federal debt. His ideas were shared by the Republicans in Congress, and in 1924, Congress passed the Revenue Act of 1924, which reduced income tax rates and eliminated all income taxation for two million people. It reduced taxes again by passing the Revenue Acts of 1926 and 1928, while keeping spending down to reduce the overall federal debt. By 1927, only the wealthiest 2% of taxpayers paid federal income tax. Federal spending remained flat during Coolidge's administration, allowing one-fourth of the federal debt to be retired.

State and local governments saw considerable growth, surpassing the federal budget in 1927. In 1929, after Coolidge's series of tax rate reductions had cut the tax rate to 24% on those making over $100,000, the federal government collected more than $1 billion in income taxes, of which 65% was from those making over $100,000. In 1921, when the tax rate on those making over $100,000 a year was 73%, the federal government collected a little over $700 million in income taxes, of which 30% was from those making over $100,000.

=== Opposition to farm subsidies ===
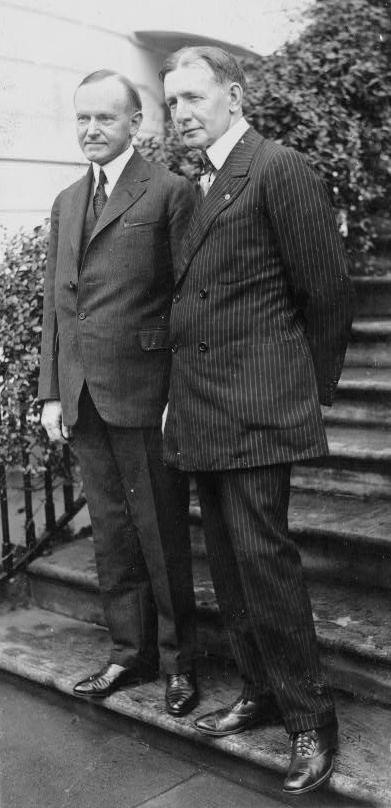
Coolidge with his vice president, Charles G. Dawes

Perhaps the most contentious issue of Coolidge's presidency was relief for farmers. Some in Congress proposed a bill designed to fight falling agricultural prices by allowing the federal government to purchase crops to sell abroad at lower prices. Agriculture Secretary Henry C. Wallace and other administration officials favored the bill when it was introduced in 1924, but rising prices convinced many in Congress that the bill was unnecessary, and it was defeated just before the 1924 elections.

In 1926, with farm prices falling once more, Senator Charles L. McNary and Representative Gilbert N. Haugen—both Republicans—proposed the McNary–Haugen Farm Relief Bill. The bill proposed a federal farm board that would purchase surplus production in high-yield years, and hold it, when feasible, for later sale or sell it abroad.

Coolidge opposed McNary-Haugen, saying that agriculture must stand "on an independent business basis" and that "government control cannot be divorced from political control". Instead of manipulating prices, he favored Herbert Hoover's proposal to increase profitability by modernizing agriculture. Secretary Mellon wrote a letter denouncing McNary-Haugen as unsound and likely to cause inflation, and it was defeated.

After McNary-Haugen's defeat, Coolidge supported a less radical measure, the Curtis-Crisp Act, which would have created a federal board to lend money to farm cooperatives in times of surplus. The bill did not pass. In February 1927, Congress took up McNary-Haugen again, this time narrowly passing it, and Coolidge vetoed it.

In his veto message, he expressed the belief that the bill would do nothing to help farmers, benefiting only exporters and expanding the federal bureaucracy. Congress did not override the veto. In May 1928, Congress passed the bill again by an increased majority, and Coolidge vetoed it again. "Farmers never have made much money" he said. "I do not believe we can do much about it."

=== Flood control ===
Coolidge has often been criticized for his actions during the Great Mississippi Flood of 1927, the worst natural disaster to hit the Gulf Coast until Hurricane Katrina in 2005. Although he eventually named Hoover to a commission in charge of flood relief, scholars argue that, overall, Coolidge showed lack of interest in federal flood control.

Coolidge believed that visiting the region after the floods would accomplish nothing and be seen as political grandstanding. He also did not want to incur the federal spending that flood control would require. He believed that property owners should bear much of the cost. Congress wanted a bill that would place the federal government completely in charge of flood mitigation. When Congress passed a compromise measure in 1928, Coolidge declined to take credit for it and signed the bill in private on May 15.

=== Civil rights ===
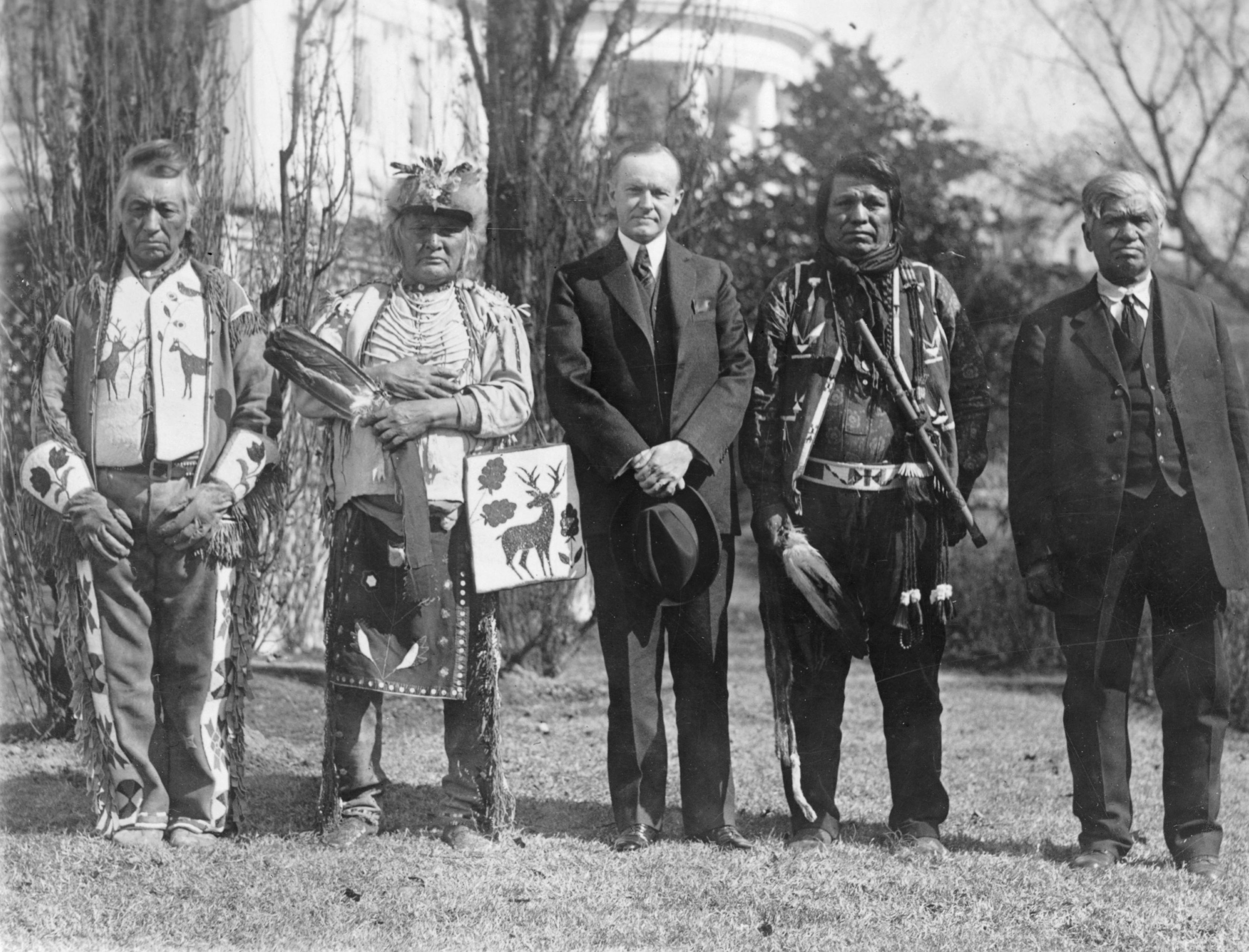
Osage men with Coolidge after he signed the bill granting Native Americans U.S. citizenship

According to one biographer, Coolidge was "devoid of racial prejudice", but he rarely took the lead on civil rights. Coolidge disliked the Ku Klux Klan and no Klansman is known to have received an appointment from him. In the 1924 presidential election, his opponents, Robert La Follette and John Davis, and his running mate, Charles Dawes, often attacked the Klan, but Coolidge avoided the subject.

Due to Coolidge's failure to condemn the Klan, some African-American leaders such as former assistant attorney general William H. Lewis endorsed Davis. Davis got little of the black vote outside Indiana, where Klan control of the Indiana Republican Party caused many blacks to vote Democratic. It is estimated that over 90% of non-Indiana blacks voted for Coolidge.

Secretary of Commerce Herbert Hoover was accused of running forced labor camps for African Americans during the Great Mississippi Flood of 1927, which led more African Americans to vote Democratic when Hoover was the Republican presidential nominee in 1928 and 1932. During Coolidge's administration, lynchings of African-Americans decreased and millions of people left the Ku Klux Klan.

Coolidge spoke in favor of African Americans' civil rights, saying in his first State of the Union address that their rights were "just as sacred as those of any other citizen" under the U.S. Constitution and that it was a "public and a private duty to protect those rights".

Coolidge repeatedly called for laws to make lynching a federal crime. It was already a state crime, though not always enforced. Congress refused to pass any such legislation. On June 2, 1924, Coolidge signed the Indian Citizenship Act, which granted U.S. citizenship to all Native Americans living on reservations. Those off reservations had long been citizens.

On June 6, 1924, Coolidge delivered a commencement address at historically black, non-segregated Howard University, in which he thanked and commended African Americans for their rapid advances in education and contributions to U.S. society over the years, as well as their eagerness to render their services as soldiers in the World War, all while faced with discrimination and prejudice at home.

On August 5, 1924, the New York County Republican Party nominated an African American, Charles H. Roberts, for Congress in New York's 21st district. One of the first African Americans elected to the New York City Board of Aldermen, Roberts became the first black Republican nominated for Congress in a northern state. When a U.S. Army sergeant at Fort Hamilton wrote to Coolidge requesting that he block Roberts's nomination, Coolidge responded, in part:

Our Constitution guarantees equal rights to all our citizens without discrimination on account of race or color. I have taken my oath to support that Constitution.... A colored man is precisely as much entitled to submit his name in a party primary as any other citizen. The decision must be made by the constituents to whom he offers himself and by nobody else....

In an October 1924 speech, Coolidge stressed tolerance of differences as an American value and thanked immigrants for their contributions to U.S. society, saying that they had "contributed much to making our country what it is". He said that although the diversity of peoples was a source of conflict and tension in Europe, it was a peculiarly "harmonious" benefit for the U.S. Coolidge added that the U.S. should assist and help immigrants and urged immigrants to reject "race hatreds" and "prejudices".

=== Foreign policy ===
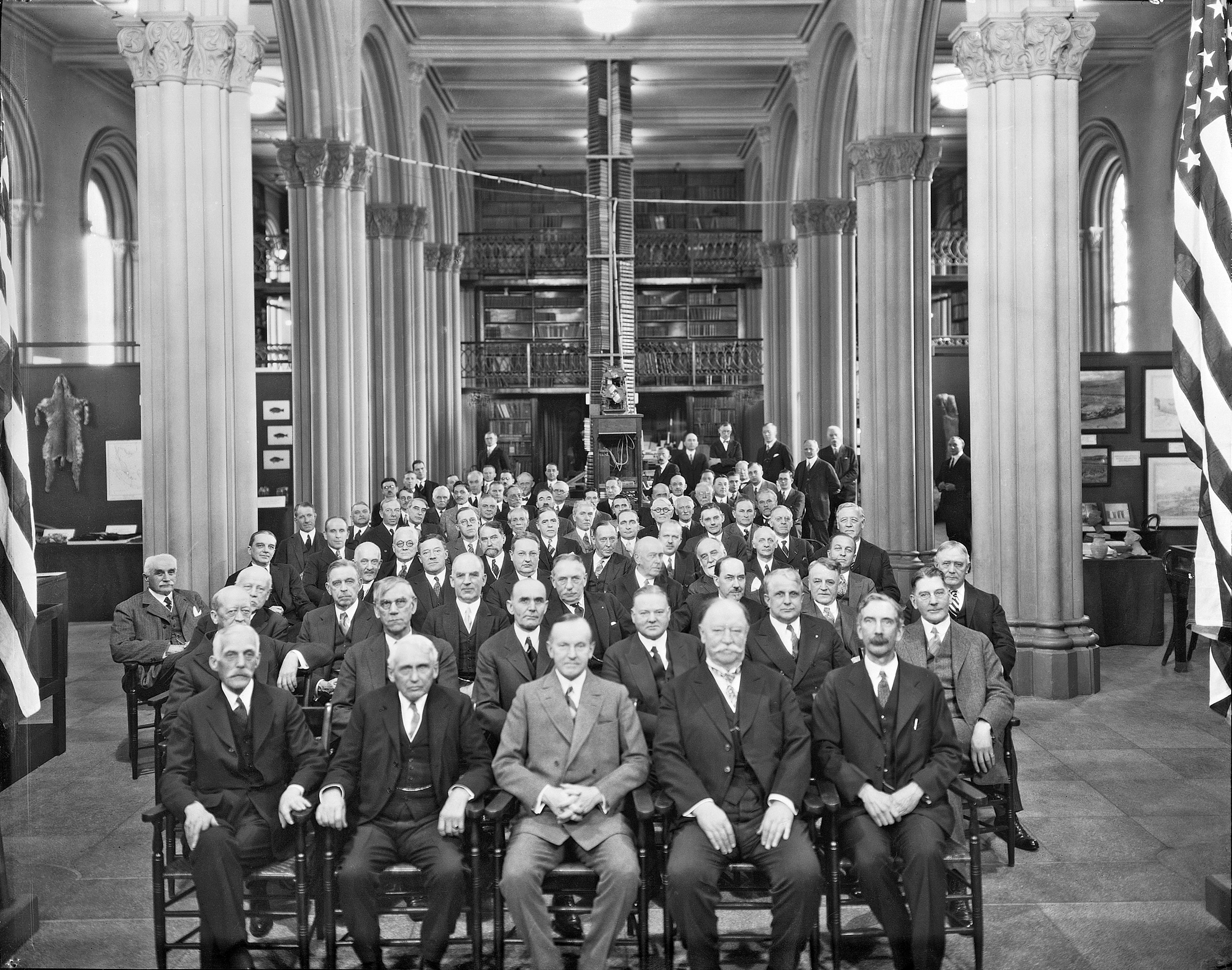
At the Smithsonian Institution, February 1927. Left to right: Secretary of the Treasury, Andrew Mellon; Secretary of State, Frank B. Kellogg; President Calvin Coolidge; former president and Chief Justice William Howard Taft, Secretary of the Smithsonian, Charles D. Walcott among others.

Coolidge was neither well versed nor very interested in world affairs. His focus was mainly on U.S. business, especially pertaining to trade, and "Maintaining the Status Quo". Although not an isolationist, he was reluctant to enter into European involvements. Coolidge believed strongly in a non-interventionist foreign policy and supported American exceptionalism. He considered the 1920 Republican victory a rejection of the Wilsonian position that the U.S. should join the League of Nations.

Coolidge did not believe the League served U.S. interests. But he spoke in favor of joining the Permanent Court of International Justice (World Court), provided that the nation would not be bound by advisory decisions. In 1926, the Senate approved joining the Court, with reservations. The League of Nations accepted the reservations, but suggested some modifications of its own. The Senate failed to act, and so the U.S. did not join the World Court.

In 1924, the Coolidge administration nominated Charles Dawes to head the multinational committee that produced the Dawes Plan. It set fixed annual amounts for Germany's World War I reparations payments and authorized a large loan, mostly from U.S. banks, to help stabilize and stimulate the German economy. Coolidge attempted to pursue further curbs on naval strength after the successes of Harding's Washington Naval Conference, by sponsoring the Geneva Naval Conference in 1927, which failed owing to a French and Italian boycott and the failure of Great Britain and the U.S. to agree on cruiser tonnages. As a result, the conference was a failure and Congress eventually authorized for increased American naval spending in 1928.

The Kellogg–Briand Pact of 1928, named for U.S. Secretary of State Frank B. Kellogg and French Foreign Minister Aristide Briand, was a key peacekeeping initiative. Ratified in 1929, the treaty committed signatories—the U.S., the United Kingdom, France, Italy, Germany, and Japan—to "renounce war, as an instrument of national policy in their relations with one another". The treaty did not achieve its intended result—to outlaw war—but it did provide the founding principle for international law after World War II. Coolidge continued the Harding administration's policy of withholding recognition of the Soviet Union.

Efforts were made to normalize ties with post-Revolution Mexico. Coolidge recognized Mexico's new governments under Álvaro Obregón and Plutarco Elías Calles, and continued U.S. support for the elected Mexican government against the National League for the Defense of Religious Liberty during the Cristero War, lifting the arms embargo on Mexico. He appointed Dwight Morrow as Ambassador to Mexico with the successful objective to avoid further conflict with Mexico.

Coolidge's administration saw continuity in the occupation of Nicaragua and Haiti. In 1924, Coolidge ended the US occupation of the Dominican Republic as a result of withdrawal agreements finalized during Harding's administration. In 1925, Coolidge ordered the withdrawal of Marines stationed in Nicaragua following perceived stability after the 1924 Nicaraguan general election. In January 1927, he redeployed them there, after failed attempts to peacefully resolve the rapid deterioration of political stability and avert the ensuing Constitutionalist War. He later sent Henry L. Stimson to mediate a peace deal that ended the civil war and extended U.S. military presence in Nicaragua beyond Coolidge's presidency.

In January 1928, to extend an olive branch to Latin American leaders embittered over U.S. interventionist policies in Central America and the Caribbean, Coolidge led the U.S. delegation to the Sixth International Conference of American States in Havana, Cuba. It was the only international trip Coolidge made during his presidency, and Coolidge was the last sitting U.S. president to visit Cuba until Barack Obama in 2016. For Canada, Coolidge authorized the St. Lawrence Seaway, a system of locks and canals that provided large vessels passage between the Atlantic Ocean and the Great Lakes.

=== Cabinet ===
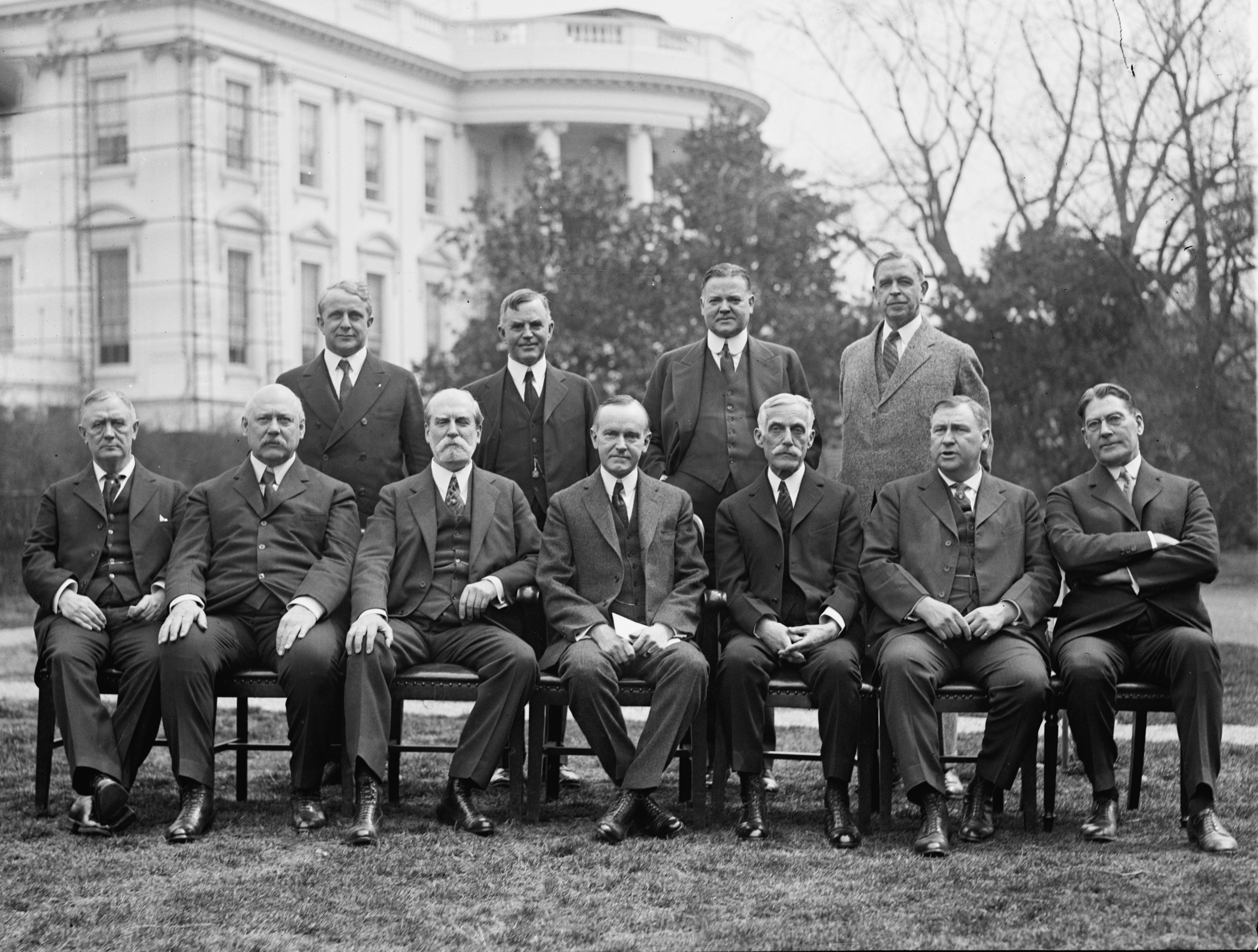
Coolidge's cabinet in 1924, outside the White House. Front row, left to right: Harry Stewart New, John W. Weeks, Charles Evans Hughes, Coolidge, Andrew Mellon, Harlan F. Stone, Curtis D. Wilbur. Back row, left to right: James J. Davis, Henry C. Wallace, Herbert Hoover, Hubert Work.

Although some of Harding's cabinet appointees were scandal-tarred, Coolidge initially retained all of them out of conviction that as successor to a deceased elected president, he was obligated to retain Harding's counselors and policies until the next election. He kept Harding's speechwriter Judson T. Welliver. Stuart Crawford replaced Welliver in November 1925. Coolidge appointed C. Bascom Slemp, a Virginia Congressman and experienced federal politician, to work jointly with Edward T. Clark, a Massachusetts Republican organizer whom he retained from his vice-presidential staff, as Secretaries to the President, a position equivalent to the modern White House Chief of Staff.

Perhaps the most powerful person in Coolidge's cabinet was Secretary of the Treasury Andrew Mellon, who controlled the administration's financial policies and was regarded by many, including House Minority Leader John Nance Garner, as more powerful than Coolidge himself. Commerce Secretary Herbert Hoover also held a prominent place in the cabinet, in part because Coolidge found value in Hoover's ability to win positive publicity with his pro-business proposals.

Secretary of State Charles Evans Hughes directed Coolidge's foreign policy until he resigned in 1925 following Coolidge's reelection. He was replaced by Frank B. Kellogg, who had previously served as a senator and ambassador to Great Britain. Coolidge made two other appointments after his reelection: William M. Jardine as Secretary of Agriculture and John G. Sargent as Attorney General. Coolidge had no vice president during his first term. Charles Dawes became vice president during Coolidge's second term, and Dawes and Coolidge clashed over farm policy and other issues.

OFFICE	NAME	TERM
President	Calvin Coolidge	1923–1929
Vice President	None	1923–1925
	Charles G. Dawes	1925–1929
Secretary of State	Charles Evans Hughes	1923–1925
	Frank B. Kellogg	1925–1929
Secretary of the Treasury	Andrew Mellon	1923–1929
Secretary of War	John W. Weeks	1923–1925
	Dwight F. Davis	1925–1929
Attorney General	Harry M. Daugherty	1923–1924
	Harlan F. Stone	1924–1925
	John G. Sargent	1925–1929
Postmaster General	Harry S. New	1923–1929
Secretary of the Navy	Edwin C. Denby	1923–1924
	Curtis D. Wilbur	1924–1929
Secretary of the Interior	Hubert Work	1923–1928
	Roy O. West	1928–1929
Secretary of Agriculture	Henry C. Wallace	1923–1924
	Howard M. Gore	1924–1925
	William M. Jardine	1925–1929
Secretary of Commerce	Herbert Hoover	1923–1928
	William F. Whiting	1928–1929
Secretary of Labor	James J. Davis	1923–1929

=== Judicial appointments ===
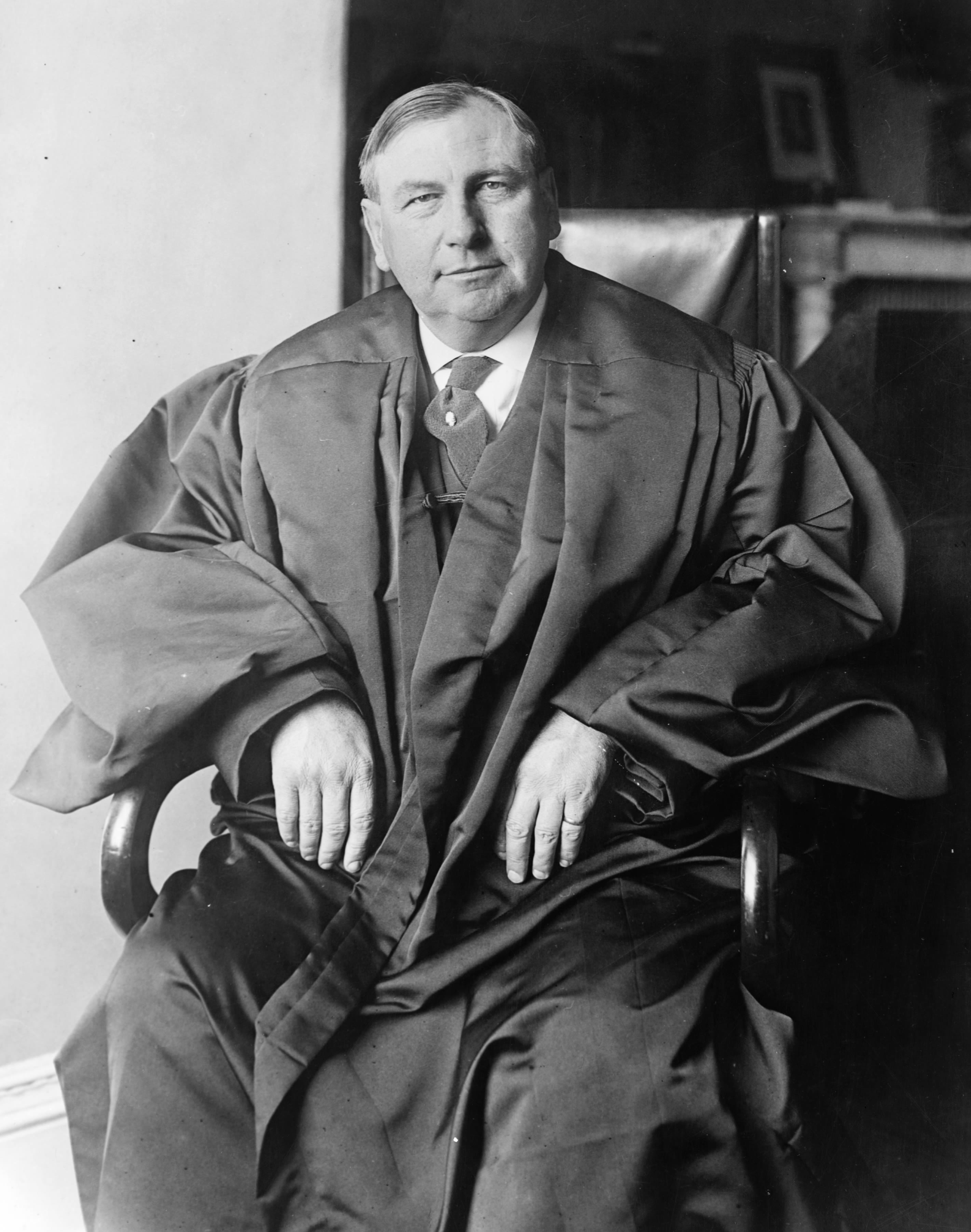
Coolidge appointed Harlan F. Stone first as attorney general and then as a Supreme Court justice.

In 1925, Coolidge appointed one justice to the Supreme Court of the United States, Harlan F. Stone. Stone was Coolidge's fellow Amherst alumnus, a Wall Street lawyer and conservative Republican. In 1924, Stone was serving as the dean of Columbia Law School when Coolidge appointed him to be attorney general to restore the reputation tarnished by Harding's attorney general, Harry M. Daugherty.

It does not appear that Coolidge considered appointing anyone other than Stone, although Stone urged him to appoint Benjamin N. Cardozo. Stone proved to be a firm believer in judicial restraint and was regarded as one of the court's three liberal justices who often voted to uphold New Deal legislation. President Franklin D. Roosevelt later appointed Stone chief justice.

Coolidge nominated 17 judges to the United States Courts of Appeals and 61 to the United States district courts. He appointed judges to various specialty courts, including Genevieve R. Cline, who became the first woman named to the federal judiciary when Coolidge placed her on the United States Customs Court in 1928. Coolidge signed the Judiciary Act of 1925 into law, allowing the Supreme Court more discretion over its workload.

=== 1928 election ===
In the summer of 1927, Coolidge vacationed in the Black Hills of South Dakota. While on vacation, he issued a terse statement that he would not seek a second full term as president: "I do not choose to run for President in 1928." After allowing the reporters to take that in, Coolidge elaborated. "If I take another term, I will be in the White House till 1933 … Ten years in Washington is longer than any other man has had it—too long!"

In his memoirs, Coolidge explained his decision not to run: "The Presidential office takes a heavy toll of those who occupy it and those who are dear to them. While we should not refuse to spend and be spent in the service of our country, it is hazardous to attempt what we feel is beyond our strength to accomplish."

After leaving office, he and Grace returned to Northampton, where he wrote his memoirs. The Republicans retained the White House in 1928 when Herbert Hoover was elected in a landslide. Coolidge was reluctant to endorse Hoover. On one occasion he remarked, "for six years that man has given me unsolicited advice—all of it bad." But Coolidge had no desire to split the party by publicly opposing Hoover's nomination.

== Post-presidency (1929–1933) ==
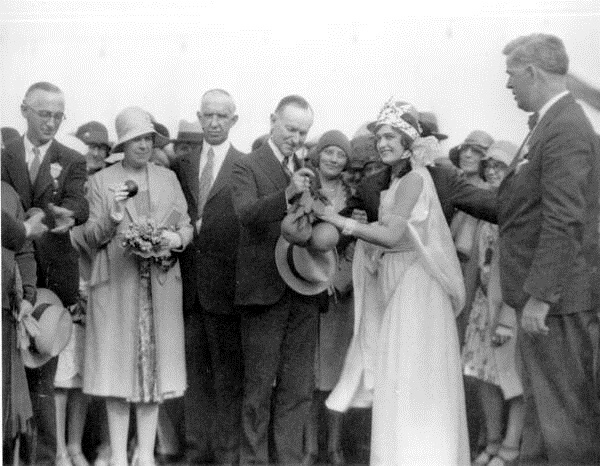
Coolidge receiving grapefruit at the Florida Orange Festival, 1930

After his presidency, Coolidge retired to a spacious home in Northampton, "The Beeches". He kept a Hacker runabout boat on the Connecticut River, and local boating enthusiasts often observed him on the water. During this time, he chaired the Non-Partisan Railroad Commission, an entity several banks and corporations created to survey the country's long-term transportation needs and make recommendations for improvements. He was an honorary president of the American Foundation for the Blind, a director of New York Life Insurance Company, president of the American Antiquarian Society, and a trustee of Amherst College.

Coolidge published his autobiography in 1929 and wrote a syndicated newspaper column, "Calvin Coolidge Says", from 1930 to 1931. Faced with looming defeat in 1932, some Republicans spoke of rejecting Herbert Hoover as their party's nominee, and instead drafting Coolidge to run, but the former president made it clear that he was not interested in running again, and that he would publicly repudiate any effort to draft him, should it come about. Hoover was renominated, and Coolidge made several radio addresses in support of him. Hoover lost the general election to Franklin D. Roosevelt in a landslide.

== Death ==
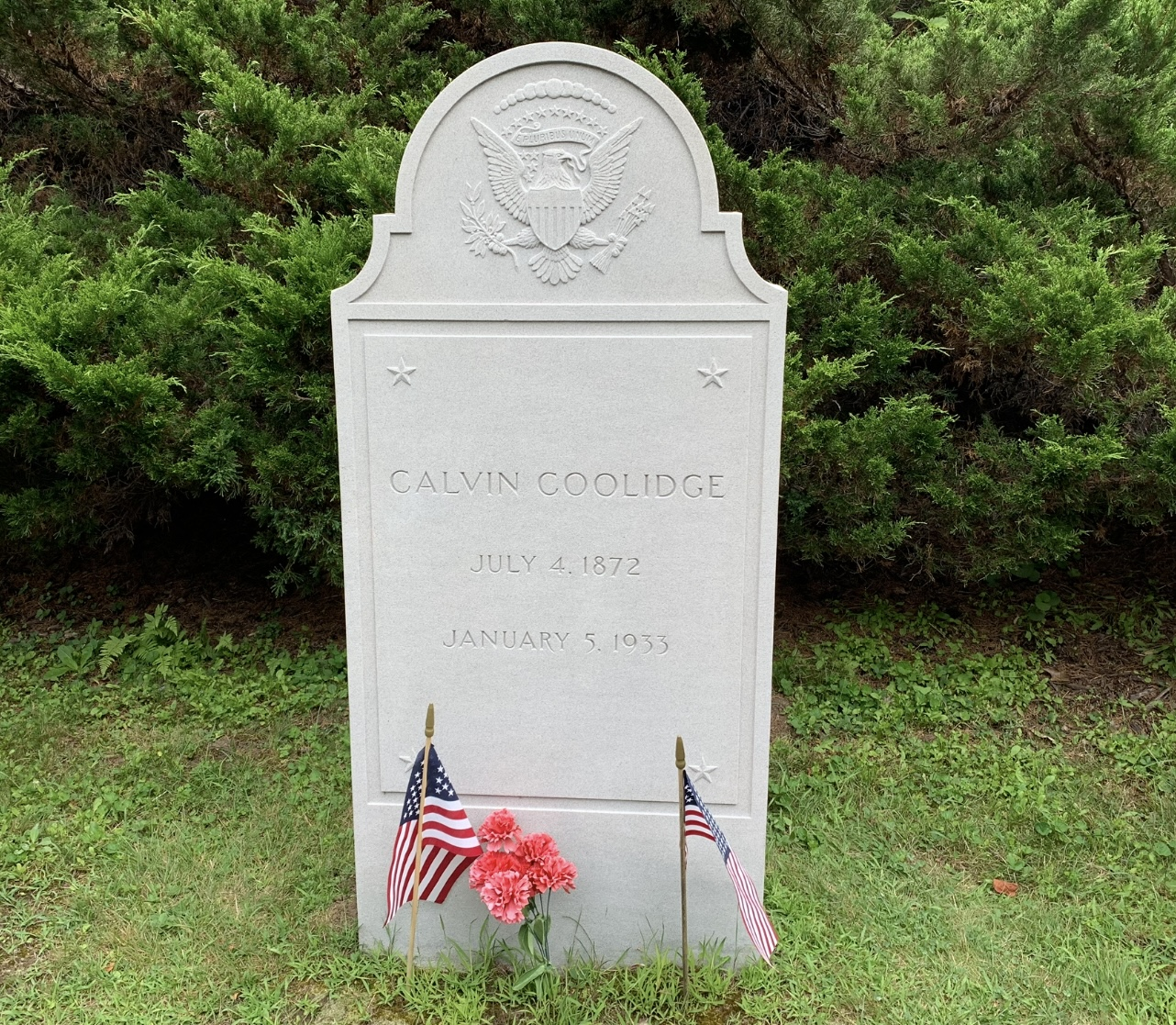
Calvin Coolidge headstone in Plymouth Notch, Vermont

Coolidge died suddenly of coronary thrombosis at The Beeches on January 5, 1933, at 12:45 p.m., aged 60. Shortly before his death, he told an old friend, "I feel I no longer fit in with these times." Coolidge's funeral was held at Edwards Congregational Church in Northampton, Massachusetts. Many prominent politicians attended the service, including Coolidge's successor Herbert Hoover, Vice President Charles Curtis, Chief Justice Charles Evans Hughes, and Secretary of State Henry L. Stimson. All the New England governors were also present.

President Herbert Hoover ordered flags at half-staff for 30 days and military and naval honors on the day of the funeral. Hoover sent out a special Message to Congress to inform them of the former president's passing.

Coolidge was then taken back to Vermont, where he was buried in Plymouth Notch Cemetery in Plymouth Notch, Vermont. The nearby family home is maintained as one of the original buildings on the Calvin Coolidge Homestead District site. The President Coolidge Historic Site was started in 1947 by the state of Vermont when they purchased and rehabilitated the childhood home of his mother. This was the first of multiple restoration projects in Plymouth Notch. In 1956 Coolidge's son John donated his father's boyhood home to the state of Vermont. In 1960 his son John, former Vermont Governor Deane C. Davis, and others founded The Calvin Coolidge Memorial Foundation to help preserve his legacy. John F. Kennedy, along with former U.S. presidents Herbert Hoover, Harry S. Truman and Dwight D. Eisenhower all became sponsors of the foundation. The house was added to the list of National Historic Landmarks on June 23, 1965. In July 1972, the State of Vermont dedicated a new visitors' center and museum nearby to mark Coolidge's 100th birthday. In celebration of the 50th anniversary of the Calvin Coolidge Foundation, a greatly expanded facility, renamed the President Calvin Coolidge Museum and Education Center, was dedicated by Vermont's Governor Jim Douglas on August 7, 2010.

Coolidge's house in Northampton, Massachusetts, was officially listed on the National Register of Historic Places on December 12, 1976. The Calvin Coolidge Presidential Library and Museum is also located in Northampton and was founded in 1920, when Coolidge began donating various records and memorabilia to the Forbes Library. This collection was furthered following his death in 1956 when the Commonwealth of Massachusetts established the Calvin Coolidge Memorial Room at the behest of his widow Grace Coolidge.

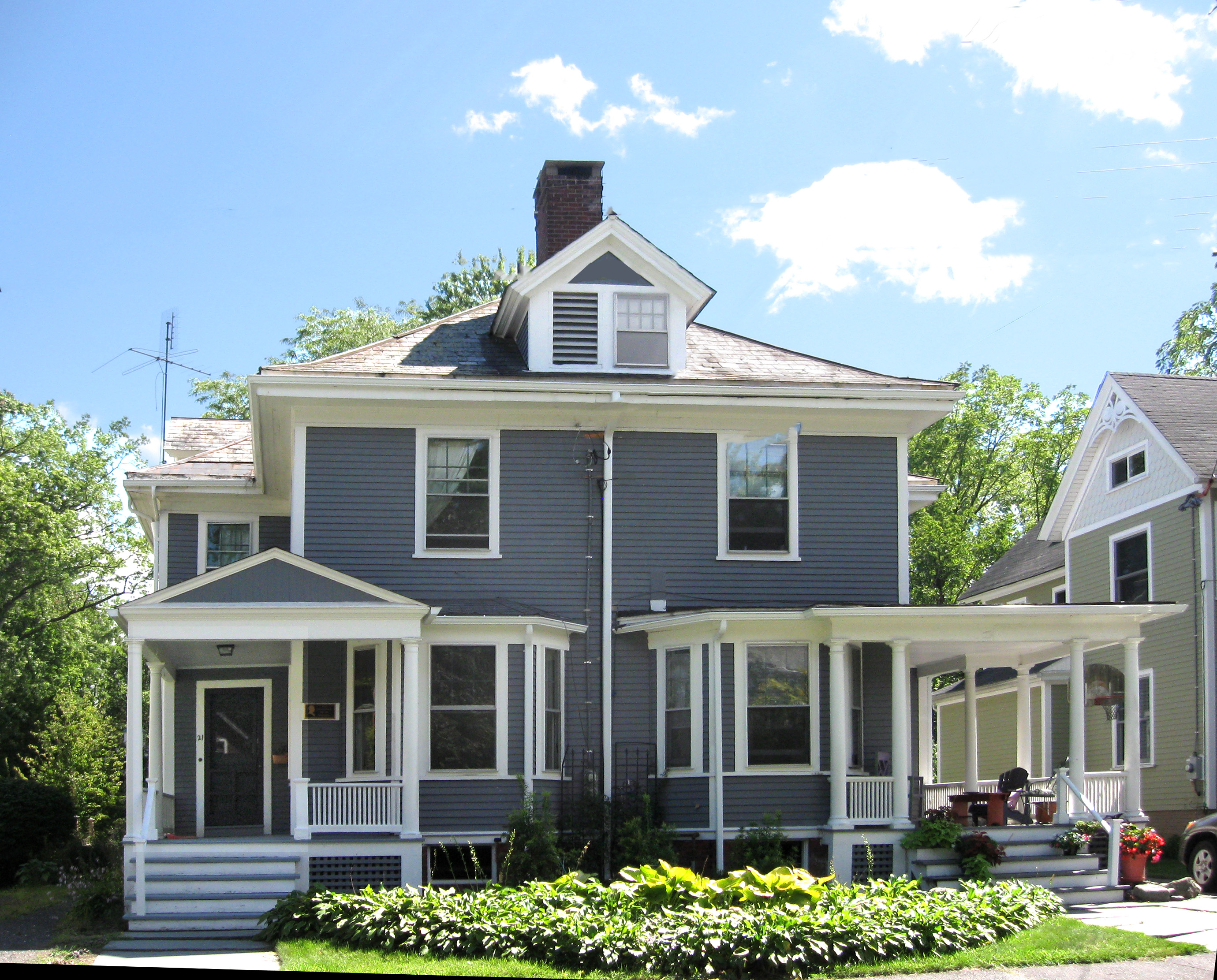
Coolidge house in Northampton, Massachusetts

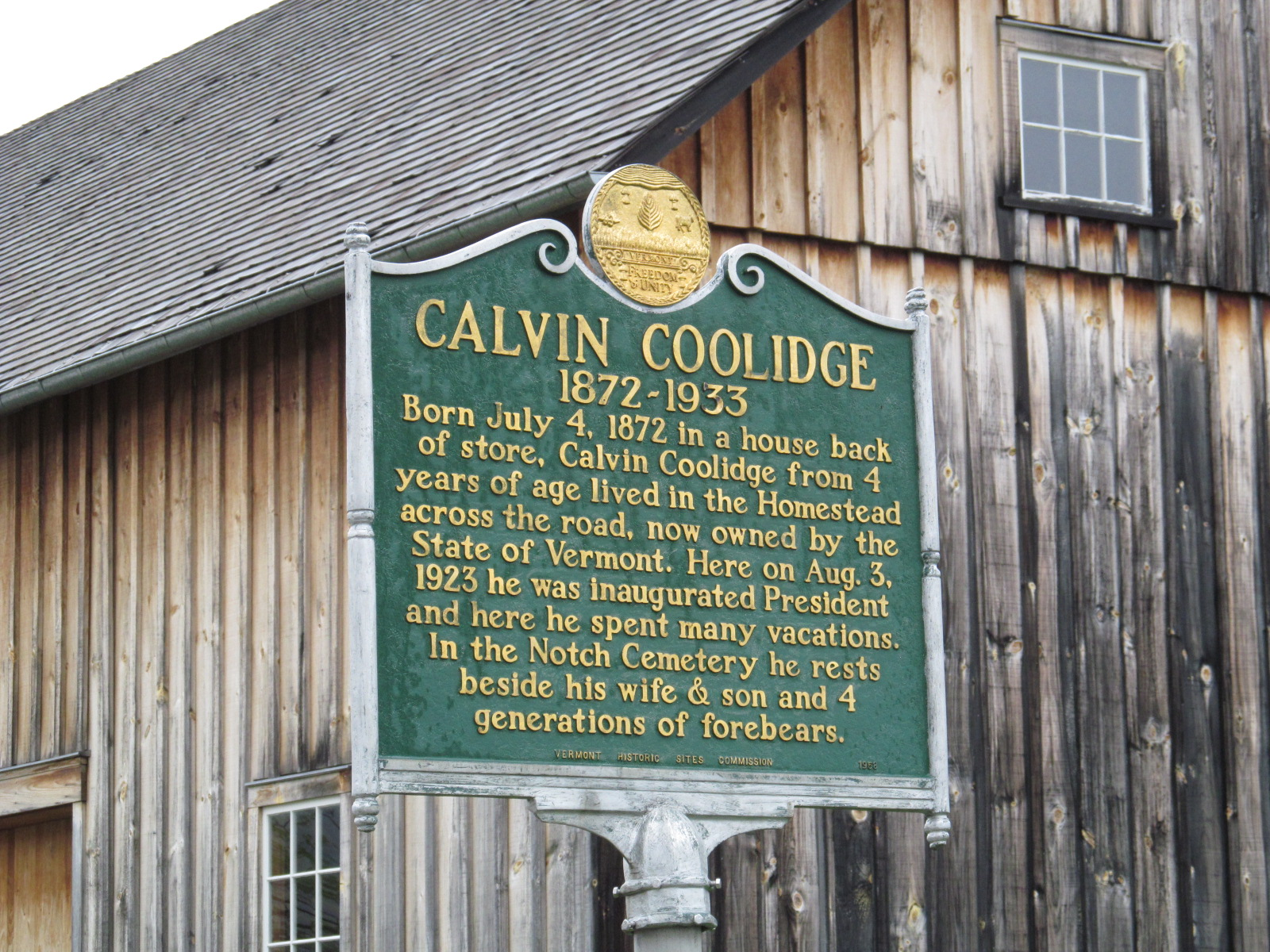
Sign of the Calvin Coolidge Historic Site in Plymouth Vermont

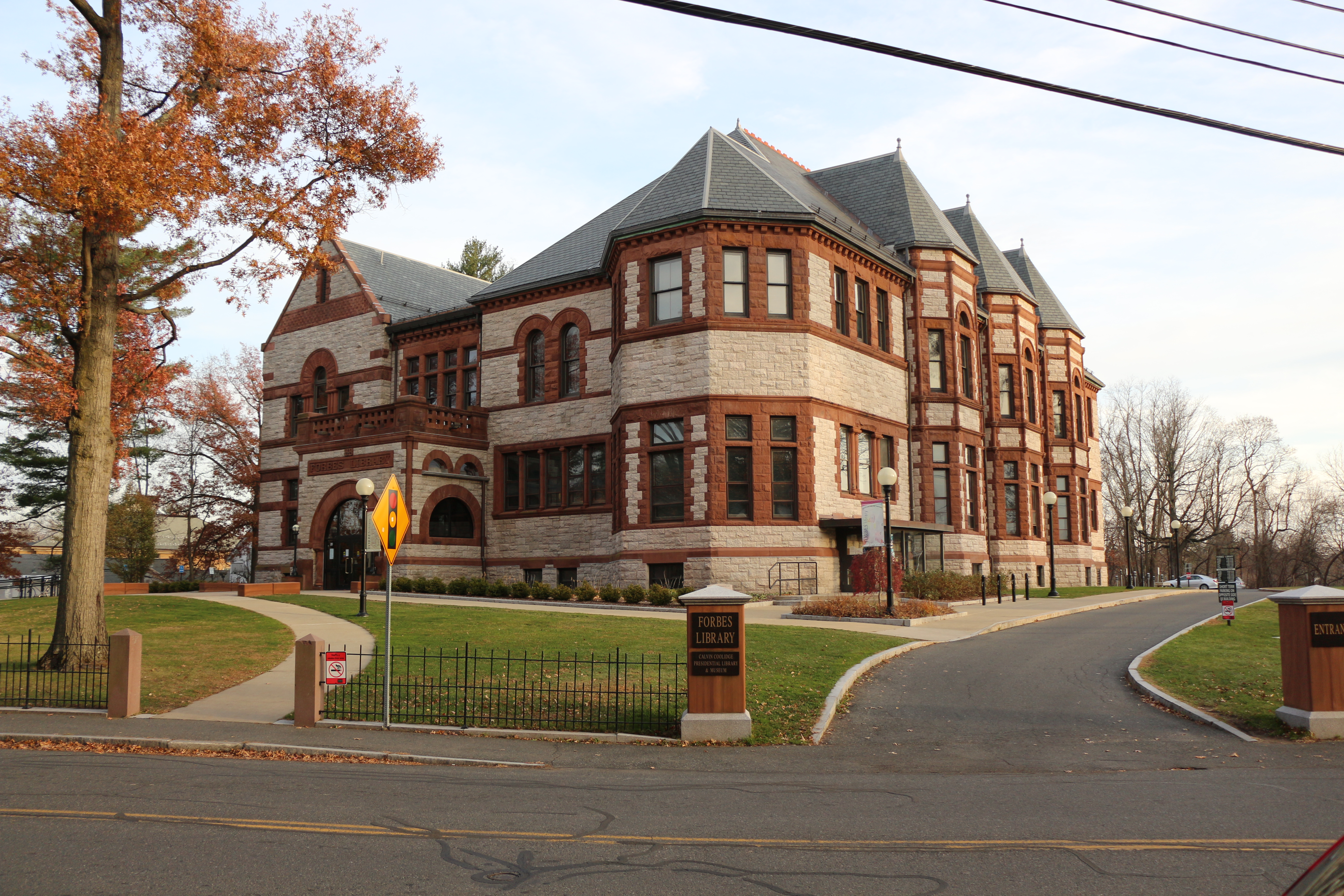
The Calvin Coolidge Presidential Library

== Legacy ==
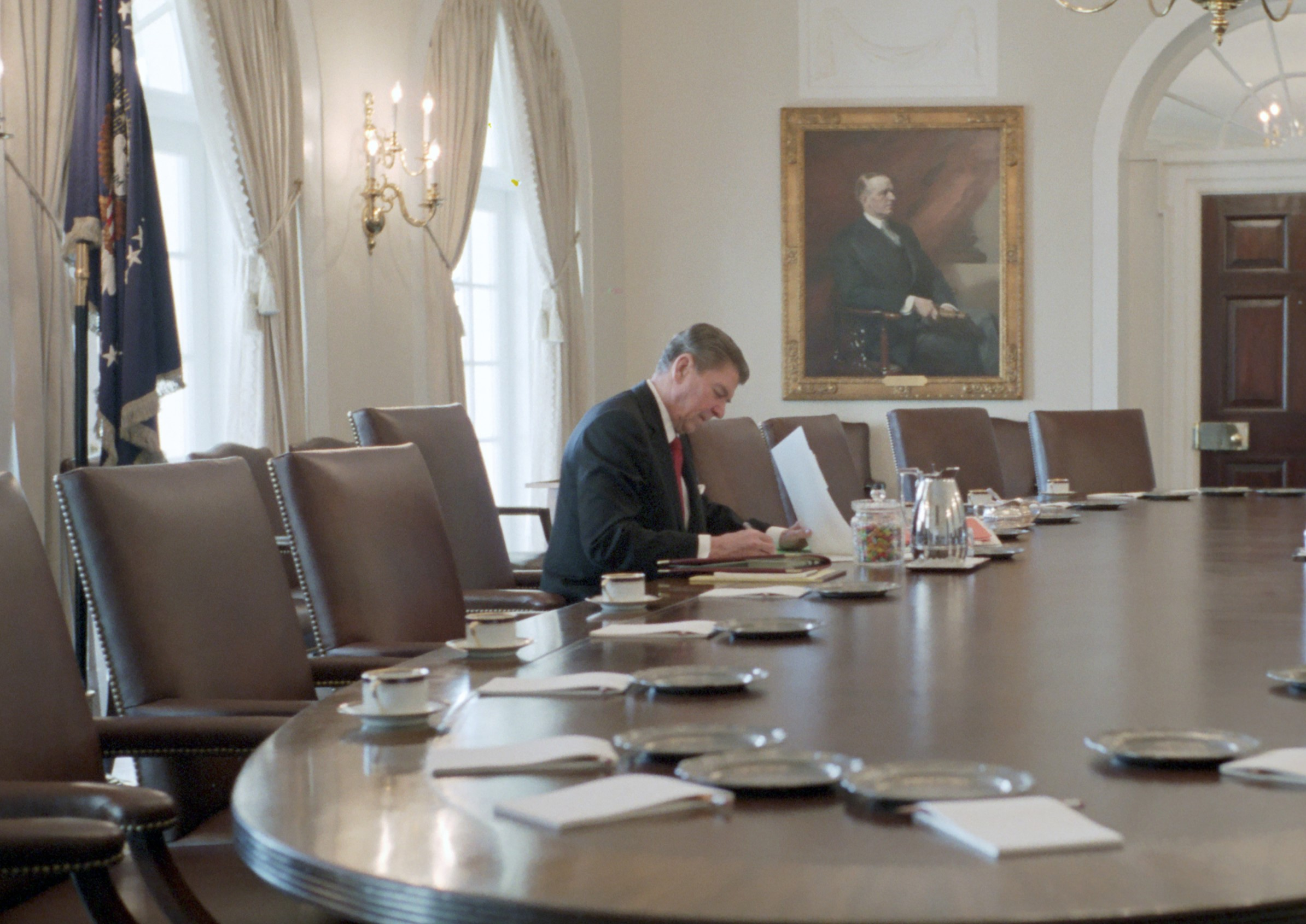
President Ronald Reagan in the White House Cabinet Room with a portrait of Coolidge in the background

Despite having been popular while in office, Coolidge is generally rated a below-average president by modern historians. Historian David Greenberg wrote, "although the public liked and admired Calvin Coolidge during his tenure, the Great Depression that began in 1929 seriously eroded his reputation and changed public opinion about his policies".

Historians have criticized Coolidge for his lack of assertiveness and have called him a "do nothing president" who enjoyed high public approval only because he was in office when things were going well around the world. Some historians have scrutinized Coolidge for signing laws that broadened federal regulatory authority and say it paved the way for corruption in future presidential administrations.

In a 1982 Chicago Tribune survey of 49 historians, Coolidge was ranked the eighth-worst U.S. president. A 2005 survey by The Wall Street Journal ranked him 23rd out of 40 presidents. In 2006, British journalist William Shawcross said he believed Coolidge was the worst president of the 20th century. In a 2021 C-SPAN survey, historians ranked Coolidge 24th out of 44 presidents. They gave him high ratings for "moral authority" and "administrative skills" but poor ratings for "setting an agenda" and "pursuing equal justice".

Although historians generally view Coolidge unfavorably, his hands-off government approach continues to resonate with modern conservatives and Republican politicians. In 1981, President Ronald Reagan publicly praised Coolidge's laissez-faire policy. Later, Reagan had a portrait of Thomas Jefferson in the White House Cabinet Room replaced by one of Coolidge. Stephen Miller, a prominent advisor to President Donald Trump, has expressed admiration for Coolidge's restriction of immigration.

== Radio, film, and commemorations ==
Despite his reputation as a quiet and even reclusive politician, Coolidge made use of the new medium of radio and made radio history several times while president. He made himself available to reporters, giving 520 press conferences, meeting with reporters more regularly than any president before or since. Coolidge said "I am very fortunate that I came in with radio ... I have a good radio voice". His second inauguration was the first presidential inauguration broadcast on radio. On December 6, 1923, his speech to Congress was broadcast on radio, the first presidential radio address. Through radio, "Silent Cal" was heard by more Americans than all previous presidents combined; he even finished fourth on a survey of the most popular "radio personalities", ahead of Will Rogers.

Coolidge signed the Radio Act of 1927, which assigned regulation of radio to the newly created Federal Radio Commission. On August 11, 1924, Theodore W. Case, using the Phonofilm sound-on-film process he developed for Lee de Forest, filmed Coolidge on the White House lawn, making him the first president to appear in a sound film, President Coolidge, Taken on the White House Grounds. When Charles Lindbergh arrived in Washington on a U.S. Navy ship after his celebrated 1927 trans-Atlantic flight, Coolidge welcomed him back to the U.S. and presented him with the Medal of Honor, and the event was filmed.

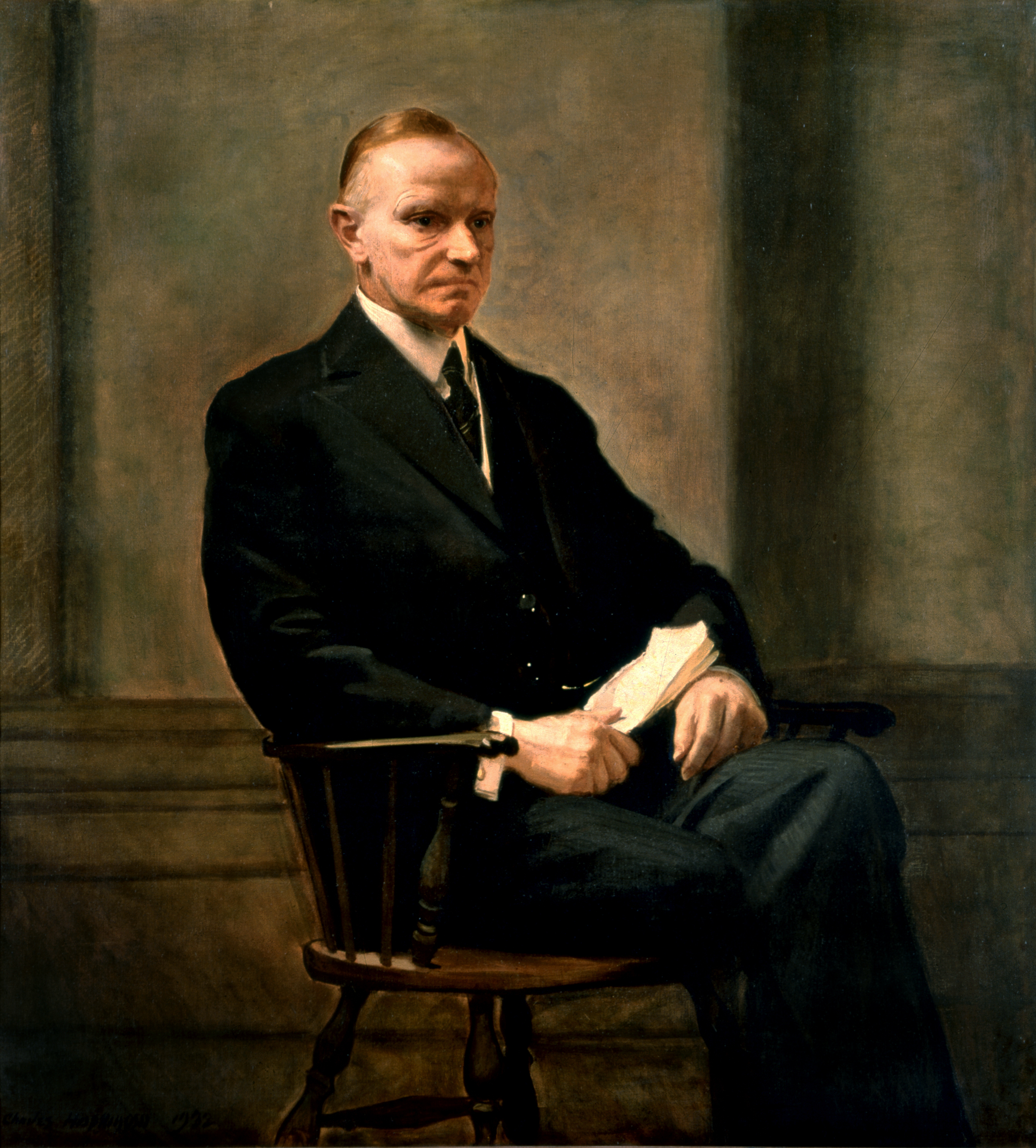
Official presidential portrait of Coolidge, 1932

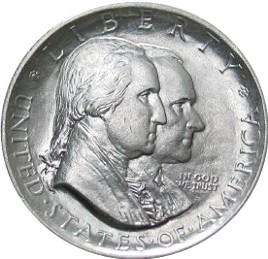
The Sesquicentennial of American Independence Half Dollar, minted in 1926

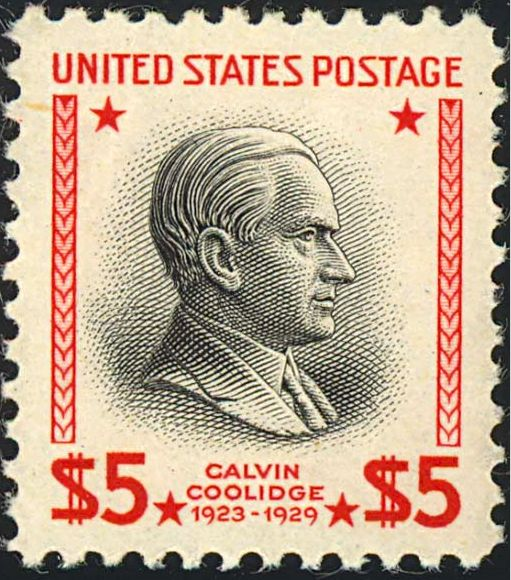
Coolidge on a 1938 postage stamp

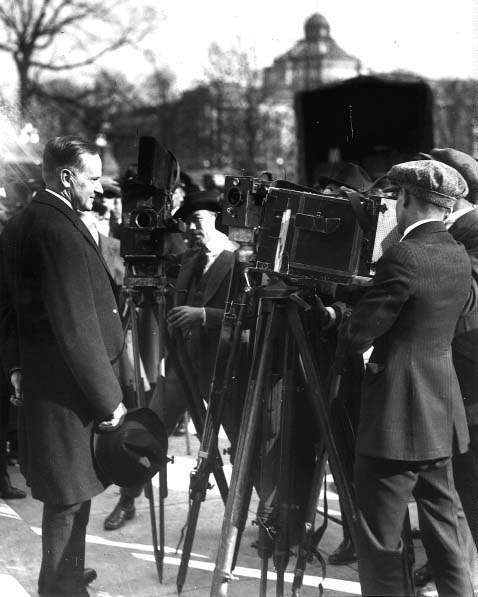
Coolidge with reporters and cameramen, 1924

Collection of video clips of President Coolidge

== See also ==
- Coolidge, Arizona
- Coolidge Dam
- List of things named after Calvin Coolidge
- Presidency of Calvin Coolidge
- SS President Coolidge

General:

- List of presidents of the United States
- List of presidents of the United States by previous experience

== Works cited ==
=== About Coolidge and his era ===
- "Confirms Daugherty's Story of Coolidge's Second Oath". St. Louis Post-Dispatch. St. Louis, Missouri. Associated Press. February 2, 1932. p. 1C. Archived from the original on May 5, 2025.
- Barry, John M. (1997). Rising Tide: The Great Mississippi Flood of 1927 and How It Changed America. Simon & Schuster. ISBN 978-0684840024.
- Buckley, Kerry W. (December 2003). "A President for the 'Great Silent Majority': Bruce Barton's Construction of Calvin Coolidge". The New England Quarterly. 76 (4): 593–626. doi:10.2307/1559844. ISSN 0028-4866. JSTOR 1559844.
- Bryson, Bill (2013), One Summer: America, 1927, New York: Doubleday, ISBN 978-0767919401
- Clemens, Cyril; Daggett, Athern P. (1945), "Coolidge's "I Do Not Choose to Run": Granite or Putty?", The New England Quarterly, 18 (2): 147–163, doi:10.2307/361282, JSTOR 361282
- Cordery, Stacy A. (2008). Alice: Alice Roosevelt Longworth, from White House Princess to Washington Power Broker. Penguin Books. ISBN 978-0143114277.
- Deloria, Vincent (1992). American Indian Policy in the Twentieth Century. University of Oklahoma Press. ISBN 978-0806124247.
- Ferrell, Robert H. (1998). The Presidency of Calvin Coolidge. University Press of Kansas. ISBN 978-0700608928.
- Freeman, Jo (2002). A Room at a Time: How Women Entered Party Politics. Rowman and Littlefield. ISBN 978-0847698059.
- de Forest, Lee (1924). "President Coolidge, Taken on the White House Ground (1924)".
- Fuess, Claude Moore (1940). Calvin Coolidge: The Man from Vermont. Little, Brown. OCLC 467020.
- Galston, Miriam (November 1995). "Activism and Restraint: The Evolution of Harlan Fiske Stone's Judicial Philosophy". Tulane Law Revue. 70: 137.
- Gilbert, Robert E. (2005). "Calvin Coolidge's Tragic Presidency: the Political Effects of Bereavement and Depression". Journal of American Studies. 39 (1): 87–109. doi:10.1017/S0021875805009266. JSTOR 27557598.
- Greenberg, David (2006). Calvin Coolidge. The American Presidents Series. Times Books. ISBN 978-0805069570.
- Handler, Milton C. (December 1995). "Clerking for Justice Harlan Fiske Stone". Journal of Supreme Court History. 20 (1): 113–122. doi:10.1111/j.1540-5818.1995.tb00098.x. ISSN 1059-4329. S2CID 145379304.
- Historian (2018). "Travels of President Calvin Coolidge". U.S. Department of State Office of the Historian. Archived from the original on December 22, 2022.
- Kappler, Charles (1929). "Indian affairs: laws and treaties Vol. IV, Treaties". Government Printing Office. Archived from the original on October 11, 2008.
- Kim, Susanna (December 18, 2014). "Here's What Happened the Last Time a US President Visited Cuba". ABC News. Archived from the original on January 6, 2017.
- Landry, Alysa (July 26, 2016). "First Sitting Prez Adopted by Tribe Starts Desecration of Mount Rushmore". IndianCountryToday.com. Archived from the original on August 4, 2019.
- Madsen, Deborah L., ed. (2015). The Routledge Companion to Native American Literature. Routledge. p. 168. ISBN 978-1317693192.
- Martin, Douglas (June 4, 2000). "John Coolidge, Guardian of President's Legacy. Dies at 93". The New York Times. ISSN 0362-4331. Archived from the original on November 19, 2020.
- McCoy, Donald R. (1967). Calvin Coolidge: The Quiet President. Macmillan. ISBN 978-1468017779.
- Miller Center (2016). "Calvin Coolidge: Foreign Affairs". millercenter.org. Miller Center of Public Affairs, University of Virginia. Archived from the original on February 20, 2016.
- Polsky, Andrew J.; Tkacheva, Olesya (Winter 2002). "Legacies versus Politics: Herbert Hoover, Partisan Conflict, and the Symbolic Appeal of Associationalism in the 1920s" (PDF). International Journal of Politics, Culture, and Society. 16 (2): 207–235. doi:10.1023/A:1020525029722. hdl:2027.42/43975. JSTOR 20020160. S2CID 142508983. Archived (PDF) from the original on August 20, 2017.
- Roberts, Gary Boyd (1995). "Ancestors of American Presidents". The Bimonthly Newsletter of the New England Historic Genealogical Society. 15: 199.
- Roberts, Jason (2014). "The Biographical Legacy of Calvin Coolidge and the 1924 Presidential Election". In Katherine A. S. Sibley (ed.). A Companion to Warren G. Harding, Calvin Coolidge, and Herbert Hoover. Wiley Blackwell. ISBN 978-1118834473.
- Rusnak, Robert J. (Spring 1983). "Andrew W. Mellon: Reluctant Kingmaker". Presidential Studies Quarterly. 13 (2): 269–278. JSTOR 27547924.
- Russell, Francis (1975). A City in Terror: Calvin Coolidge and the 1919 Boston Police Strike. Beacon Press. ISBN 978-0807050330.
- Senate Historian (2014). "Charles G. Dawes, 30th Vice President (1925–1929)". US Senate. Archived from the original on November 6, 2014.
- Shlaes, Amity (2013). Coolidge. New York: HarperCollins. ISBN 978-0061967559.
- Sobel, Robert (1998a). Coolidge: An American Enigma. Regnery Publishing. ISBN 978-0895264107.
- Sobel, Robert (1998b). "Coolidge and American Business". John F. Kennedy Library and Museum. Archived from the original on March 8, 2006.
- White, William Allen (1938). A Puritan in Babylon: The Story of Calvin Coolidge. Macmillan.

=== By Coolidge ===
- Coolidge, Calvin (1919). Have Faith in Massachusetts: A Collection of Speeches and Messages (2nd ed.). Houghton Mifflin.
- Coolidge, Calvin (2004) [1926]. Foundations of the Republic: Speeches and Addresses. University Press of the Pacific. ISBN 978-1410215987.
- Coolidge, Calvin (1929). The Autobiography of Calvin Coolidge. Cosmopolitan Book Corp. OCLC 1228046023. Archived from the original on January 2, 2025.
- Coolidge, Calvin (2001). Peter Hannaford (ed.). The Quotable Calvin Coolidge: Sensible Words for a New Century. Images From The Past, Incorporated. ISBN 978-1884592331.

Massachusetts House of Representatives
Preceded by Moses M. Bassett	Member of the Massachusetts House of Representatives; 1907–1909	Succeeded by Charles A. Montgomery
Massachusetts Senate
Preceded by Allen T. Treadway	Member of the Massachusetts Senate; 1912–1915	Succeeded by John B. Hull
Political offices
Preceded by James W. O'Brien	Mayor of Northampton, Massachusetts; 1910–1912	Succeeded by William Feiker
Preceded by Levi H. Greenwood	President of the Massachusetts Senate; 1914–1915	Succeeded by Henry Gordon Wells
Preceded by Grafton D. Cushing	Lieutenant Governor of Massachusetts; 1916–1919	Succeeded by Channing H. Cox
Preceded by Samuel W. McCall	Governor of Massachusetts; 1919–1921	Succeeded by Channing H. Cox
Preceded by Thomas R. Marshall	Vice President of the United States; 1921–1923	Succeeded by Charles G. Dawes
Preceded by Warren G. Harding	President of the United States; 1923–1929	Succeeded by Herbert Hoover
Party political offices
Preceded by Grafton D. Cushing	Republican nominee for Lieutenant Governor of Massachusetts; 1915, 1916, 1917	Succeeded by Channing H. Cox
Preceded by Samuel W. McCall	Republican nominee for Governor of Massachusetts; 1918, 1919	Succeeded by Channing H. Cox
Preceded by Charles W. Fairbanks	Republican nominee for Vice President of the United States; 1920	Succeeded by Frank Orren Lowden; Withdrew
Preceded by Warren G. Harding	Republican nominee for President of the United States; 1924	Succeeded by Herbert Hoover
