= 1918 Massachusetts gubernatorial election =

- November 5, 1918
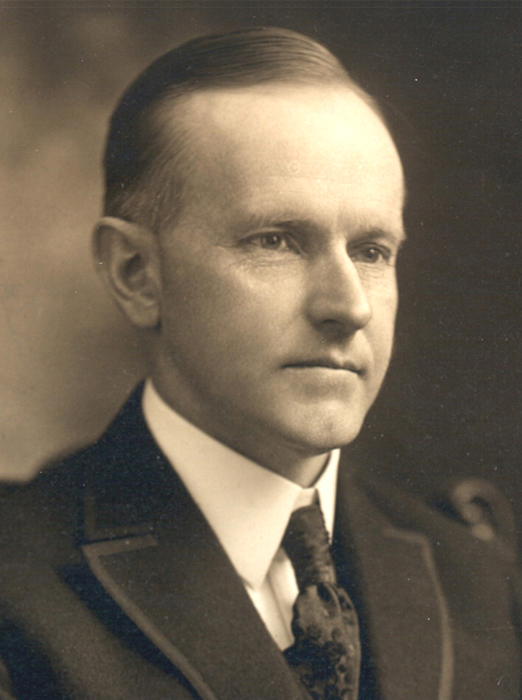

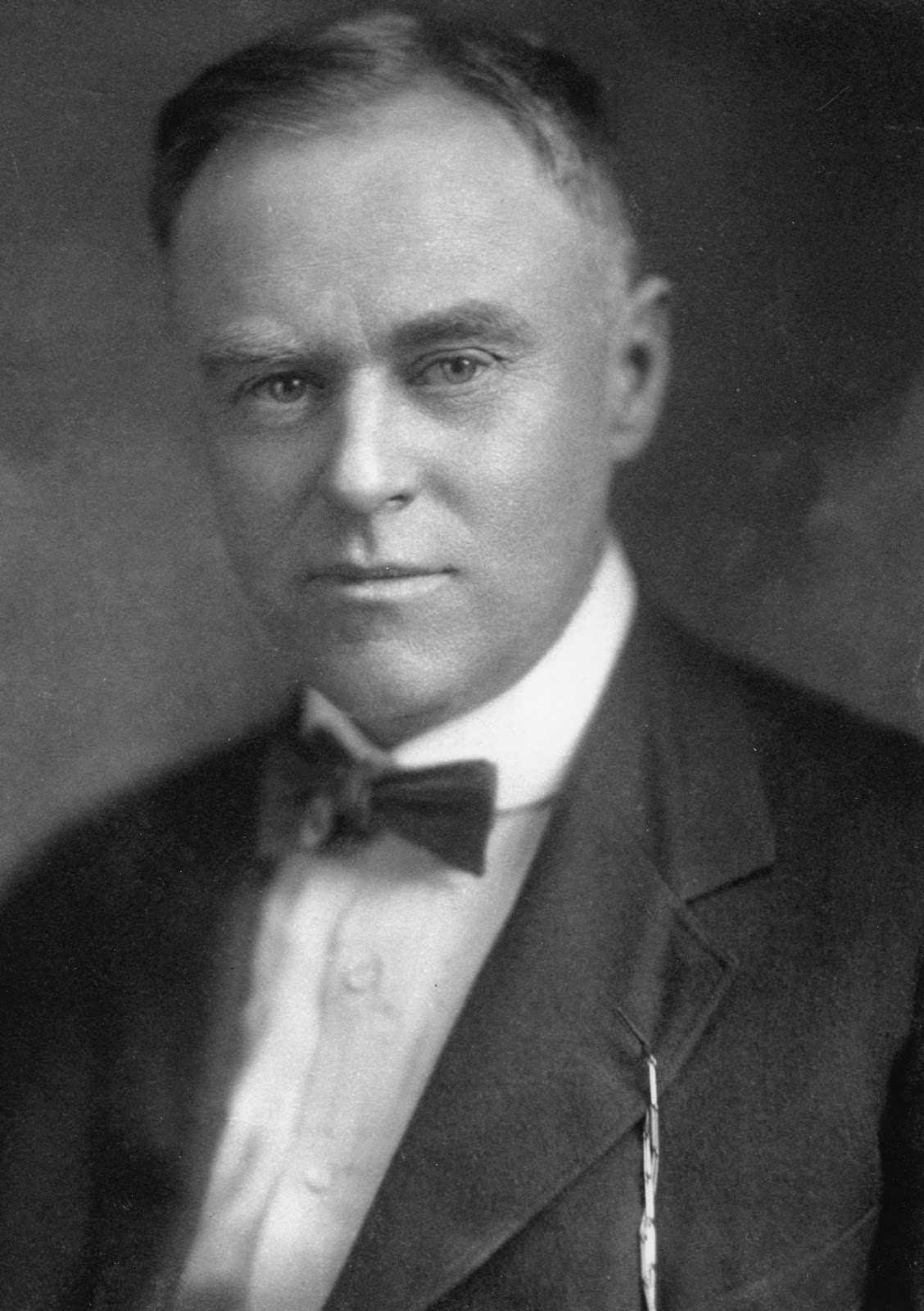
Nominee	Calvin Coolidge	Richard H. Long
Party	Republican	Democratic
Popular vote	214,863	197,828
Percentage	50.87%	46.84%
- Coolidge: 40-50% 50–60% 60–70% 70–80% 80–90% >90% Long: 40-50% 50–60% 60–70%
Governor before election
Samuel W. McCall
Republican
Elected Governor
Calvin Coolidge
Republican

The 1918 Massachusetts gubernatorial election was held on November 4, 1918.

== Republican primary ==
=== Governor ===
==== Candidates ====
- Calvin Coolidge, incumbent lieutenant governor

===== Declined =====
- Samuel W. McCall, incumbent governor (to run for U.S. Senate)

Lieutenant Governor Coolidge was unopposed for the Republican nomination.

==== Results ====
Republican gubernatorial primary, 1918
Party	Candidate	Votes	%
Republican	Calvin Coolidge	81,238	99.97%
Write-in	All others	22	0.03%
Total votes		81,260	100.00%

=== Lt. governor ===
==== Candidates ====
- Channing H. Cox, speaker of the Massachusetts House of Representatives
- Guy Andrews Ham, former governor's councilor and candidate for lieutenant governor in 1915

===== Declined =====
- Edwin U. Curtis, former mayor of Boston
- Alvan T. Fuller, U.S. representative

==== Results ====
Republican gubernatorial primary, 1918
Party	Candidate	Votes	%
Republican	Channing H. Cox	58,481	68.45%
Republican	Guy Andrews Ham	26,957	31.55%
Write-in	All others	1	0.00%
Total votes		85,439	100.00%

== Democratic primary ==
=== Governor ===
==== Candidates ====
- Edward P. Barry, former lieutenant governor
- William A. Gaston, nominee for governor in 1902 and 1903
- Richard H. Long, Framingham businessman

===== Withdrew =====
- Frederick Mansfield, former treasurer and receiver-general of Massachusetts and nominee for governor in 1916 and 1917 (endorsed Gaston)

==== Results ====
Democratic gubernatorial primary, 1918
Party	Candidate	Votes	%
Democratic	Richard H. Long	23,546	38.65%
Democratic	William A. Gaston	20,968	34.41%
Democratic	Edward P. Barry	16,411	26.94%
Write-in	All others	3	0.00%
Total votes		60,928	100.00%

=== Lt. governor ===
==== Candidates ====
- Joseph H. O'Neil, former U.S.representative

O'Neil was unopposed for the Democratic nomination.

Democratic gubernatorial primary, 1918
Party	Candidate	Votes	%
Democratic	Joseph H. O'Neil	3,948	95.00%
Write-in	All others	208	5.00%
Total votes		4,156	100.00%

== General election ==
=== Candidates ===
- Calvin Coolidge, incumbent lieutenant governor (Republican)
- Richard H. Long, car dealer from Framingham (Democratic)
- Sylvester McBride (Socialist)
- Ingvar Paulsen (Socialist Labor)

=== Results ===
Massachusetts gubernatorial election, 1918
Party	Candidate	Votes	%	±%
Republican	Calvin Coolidge	214,863	50.87%	
Democratic	Richard H. Long	197,828	46.84%	
Socialist	Sylvester J. McBride	7,757	1.84%	
Socialist Labor	Ingvar Paulsen	1,913	0.45%	
Write-in	All others	9	0.00%	

== See also ==
- 1918 Massachusetts legislature
- 1918 Massachusetts Question 1

== Bibliography ==
- Office of the Secretary of the Commonwealth (1919). Election Statistics, 1918. Boston, MA.
