= Richard H. Long =

American businessman and politician

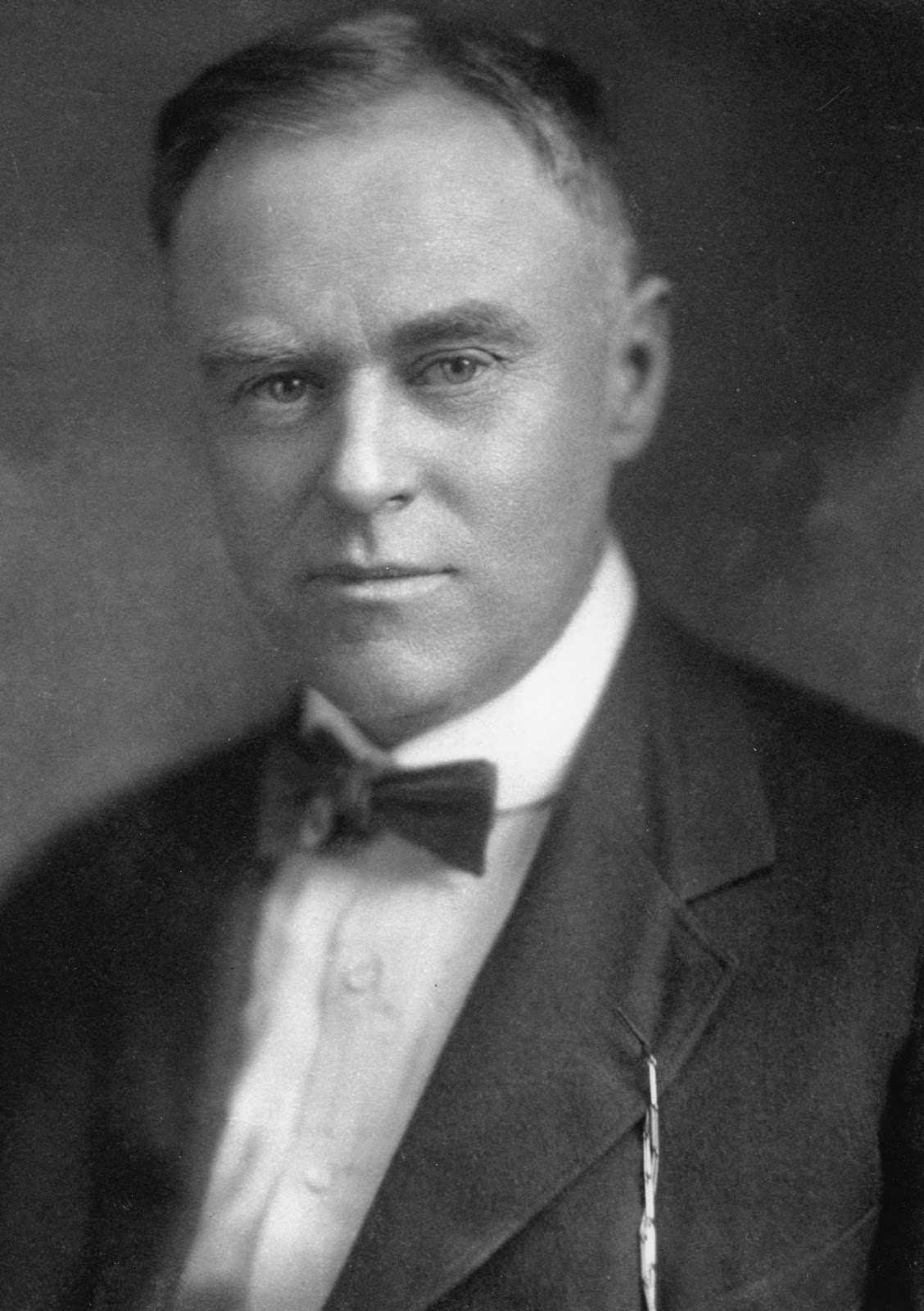
- Born: 1865; South Weymouth, Massachusetts
- Died: April 16, 1957 (aged 91); Framingham, Massachusetts
- Known for: Democratic nominee for Governor of Massachusetts (1918, 1919); President of R. H. Long Motors Company, R. H. Long Shoe Company, & R. H. Long Motor Sales Company
- Spouse(s): Mabelle H. Fernald (1891–1920; her death); Laura Bosqute (1921–1947; her death); Helen Vose (1950–1957; his death)
- Relatives: Charles G. Long, brother

Richard Henry Long (1865–1957) was an American businessman and politician who was the Democratic nominee for Governor of Massachusetts in 1918 and 1919. He lost both elections to future President of the United States Calvin Coolidge.

== Early life ==
Long was born in South Weymouth, Massachusetts, in 1865. When he was 14 years old he went to work in his father's shoe factory in Braintree, Massachusetts. In 1891 he married Mabelle H. Fernald, a schoolteacher from Braintree. The couple would have six children.

== Business career ==
When Long was 24 years old he took over his father's shoe manufacturing firm. In 1895 he moved the company to Belchertown, Massachusetts, and renamed it the R. H. Long Shoe Company. In 1903, Long opened a new shoe factory in Framingham, Massachusetts. The R. H. Long Shoe Company remained in business until September 1, 1923.

During World War I the factory switched to manufacturing war supplies - leather and canvas goods- for England. When the U.S. joined the war, the R. H. Long Company supplied the U.S. Army. In 1922, Long's R. H. Long Motors Company began production of the Bay State car. The R. H. Long Motors Company ceased production of cars in 1926.

In 1927, Long formed the R. H. Long Motor Sales Company, which owned car dealerships in Framingham and Wellesley, Massachusetts. The business still exists today as Long Automotive Group with dealerships in Southborough, Massachusetts (Long Cadillac) and Webster, Massachusetts (Long Subaru).

== Political career ==
In 1896, Long supported William Jennings Bryan for President. He briefly left the Democratic Party in 1912 to challenge John W. Weeks for the Republican nomination in Massachusetts's 13th congressional district. The following year, however, Long was once again a Democrat and he ran for the party's nomination for Lieutenant Governor of Massachusetts. He lost the primary to Edward P. Barry. In 1916, Long was a leader in Woodrow Wilson's campaign for president.

In 1918 Long ran for Governor of Massachusetts. He defeated William A. Gaston and Barry in a close 3-way Democratic primary, but lost the general election to Republican Calvin Coolidge 51% to 47%. He ran again in 1919 and easily won the Democratic primary over Eugene Foss, George F. Monahan, and Frederick Simpson Deitrick with 68% of the vote. He once again lost the general election to Coolidge, this time 61% to 37%. Long's huge defeat was largely attributed to his support for the Boston Police Department officers who took part in the Boston Police Strike.

On July 20, 1920, Long announced plans to run for governor for a third time. He narrowly lost the Democratic nomination to John Jackson Walsh.

By 1920, Long no longer supported the Wilson administration, stating that it was "demoralizing the Democratic Party". On October 25, 1920, he endorsed Republican Warren G. Harding for President, stating that he believed the Democratic Party "would be better off under Harding than under Cox".

Long was a delegate to the 1928 Democratic National Convention. He was pledged to Al Smith, but did not support him due to Smith's stance in favor of modifying the 18th Amendment. Long was the only member of the Massachusetts delegation who voted against Smith.

== Personal life and death ==
On July 10, 1920, Mabelle Long was a passenger in a plane that crashed in Salisbury, Massachusetts, en route from Franklin Field to Hampton, New Hampshire. She was found alive at the scene but died by the time she reached Anna Jaques Hospital in Newburyport, Massachusetts. On July 17, 1921, Long married Laura Bosqute, a stenographer in his Worcester office, in a private ceremony. She was 21 years his junior and thrice divorced. Laura Long died on May 15, 1947. On January 22, 1950, Long, then 84, married his 44-year-old secretary, Helen Vose.

Long died on April 16, 1957, in Framingham. He was survived by his wife and 4 of his children.

Party political offices
Preceded by Frederick Mansfield	Democratic nominee for Governor of Massachusetts; 1918, 1919	Succeeded by John Jackson Walsh
