= Nixon's Florida White House =

Compound in Key Biscayne, Florida

Nixon’s Florida White House
- The President's compound in Key Biscayne, Florida - NARA

- Location within Florida
- Coordinates: 25.6918°N 80.1742°W

The Florida White House (or Winter White House) was an informal name for a compound in Key Biscayne, Florida, used by U.S. president Richard Nixon.

== History ==
Nixon purchased the first of his three waterfront homes, 500 Bay Lane, during 1969 from his former Senate colleague George Smathers of Florida. Nixon visited it at least 50 times while in office as President from 1969 to 1974.

Nixon's compound was close to the home of Charles "Bebe" Rebozo who resided at 490 Bay Lane and of industrialist Robert Abplanalp (inventor of the modern aerosol spray can valve). Bebe Rebozo, president/owner of the Key Biscayne Bank, was indicted for money-laundering a $100,000 donation from Howard Hughes to the Nixon election campaign.

According to an exposé by Don Fulsom, Nixon and Rebozo got bargain real estate prices from Donald Berg, a Mafia-associated Rebozo business partner. The Secret Service eventually advised Nixon to stop associating with Berg. The lender for one of Nixon's properties was Arthur Desser, who consorted with both Teamsters President Jimmy Hoffa and mobster Meyer Lansky. Nixon and Rebozo were friends of James V. Crosby, the chairman of a company repeatedly associated with major mobsters, and Rebozo's Key Biscayne Bank was a suspected pipeline for Mafia money from Crosby's casino in The Bahamas. By the 1960s, FBI agents monitoring the Mafia had identified Rebozo as a "non-member associate of organized crime figures".

President John F. Kennedy and Nixon met for the first time after the 1960 presidential election in an oceanfront villa at the old Key Biscayne Hotel. As the Watergate scandal developed, Nixon spent more time in seclusion there.

The United States Department of Defense spent $400,000 constructing a helicopter landing pad in Biscayne Bay adjacent to the Nixon compound. When Nixon sold his property, including the helicopter pad, there were public accusations that he enriched himself at taxpayer expense.

The house was used for the filming of several scenes in the 1983 gangster movie Scarface, starring Al Pacino; it was featured as the home of Frank Lopez, played by Robert Loggia.

The original building was razed during July 2004 by owner Edgardo Defortuna, president of Fortune International Realty.

== See also ==
- La Casa Pacifica
- List of residences of presidents of the United States
- Richard Nixon Helipad
