= La Casa Pacifica =

Historic house in California, United States

Coordinates: 33.390989°N 117.597081°W

La Casa Pacífica
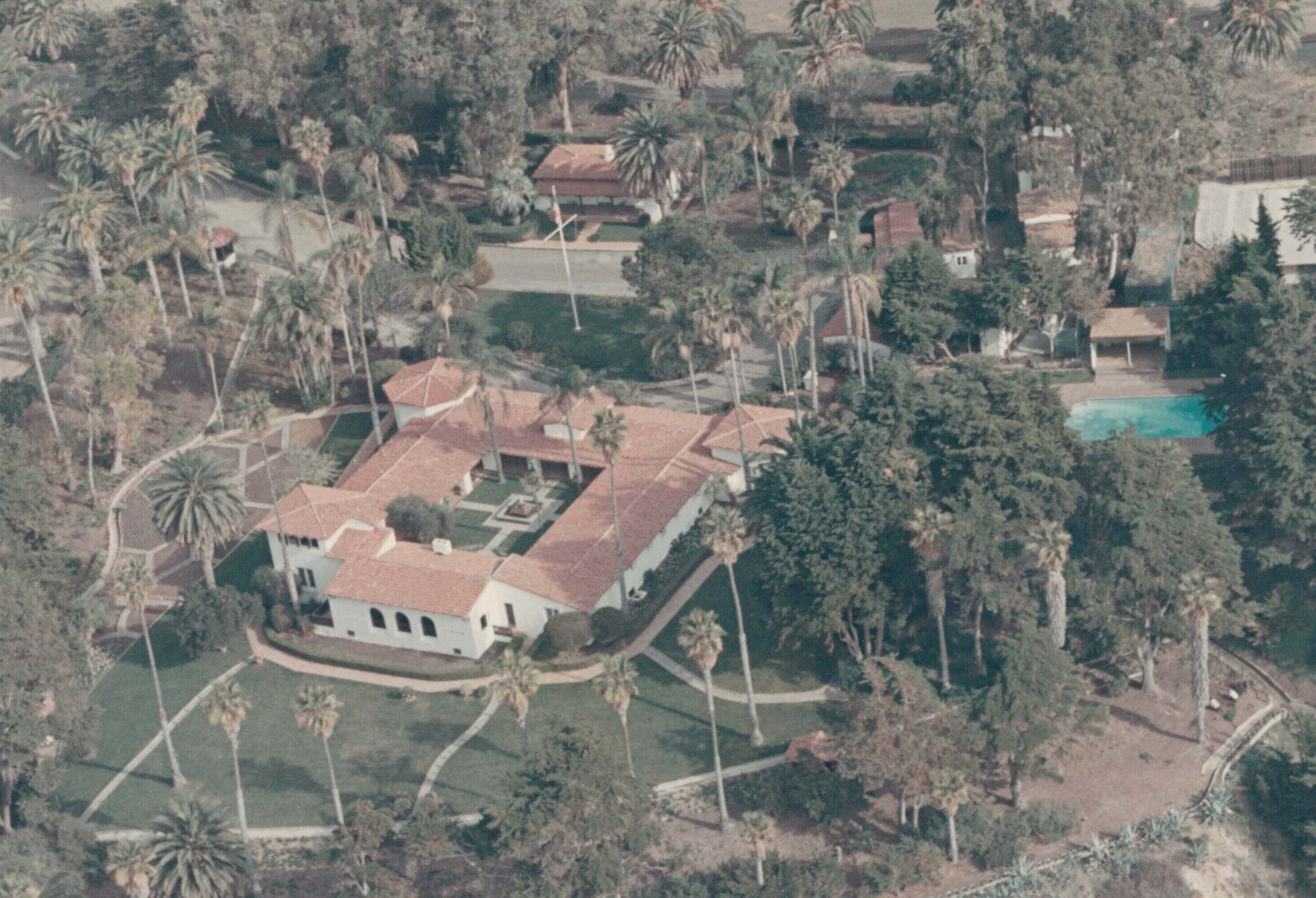

General information
- Architectural style: Mission Revival
- Location: 4100 Calle Isabella; San Clemente, California
- Year built: 1926

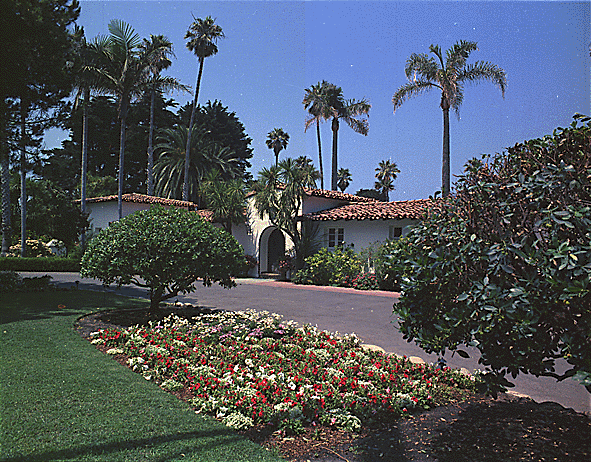
Exterior of the San Clemente house

La Casa Pacifica (Spanish: La Casa Pacífica, meaning "The House of Peace") is a classic California beachfront mansion located in the gated community of Cottons Point Estates/Cypress Shores in the South Orange County beach town of San Clemente, California, and overlooks the Pacific Ocean from its blufftop position. This estate is also known as President Richard Nixon's Western White House, used while living and working outside of Nixon's Florida White House and the official presidential residence, the White House in Washington, D.C.

== History ==
The large Spanish-style California Mission Revival Style mansion was modeled after a country home in San Sebastian, Spain and was designed by architect Carl Lindbom. It was built in 1926 for Hamilton H. Cotton, one of the founding financiers of the city of San Clemente, and a Democratic Party backer who entertained President Franklin D. Roosevelt and other prominent Democrats as guests in his home.

Around the time Nixon took office in 1969 he asked a young campaign aide, Fred Divel, to search the coast of Southern California for a presidential hideaway. Divel found the Cotton estate at the southernmost end of the then-sleepy San Clemente and immediately adjacent to the northern border of the massive Camp Pendleton Marine Base (USMC). Nixon bought the estate in 1969 from Cotton's widow, and dubbed the home "La Casa Pacifica". It was soon nicknamed "The Western White House" by the press, and the name was favored by Nixon himself; the latter became the term of subsequent similar presidential homes.

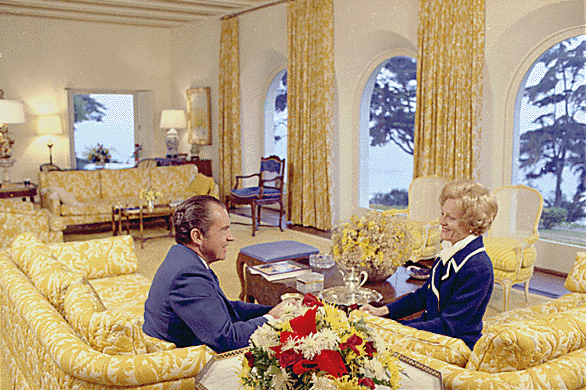
President Richard and first lady Pat Nixon in the living room, 1971

After purchasing the estate Nixon made a number of alterations to the original home, done for both personal preferences and for the needs of the Secret Service. The tennis court was replaced with a swimming pool and much of the estate was wrapped by a 1,500-foot (460 m) C-shaped wall. The rose garden contains a magnolia that Pat Nixon brought as a seedling taken from the magnolia tree that Andrew Jackson planted at the White House.

Today the almost six-acre (2.4 ha) estate includes about 9,000 square feet (840 m^{2}) of living space, with tile and hardwood flooring, arched doorways and detailed groin-vaulted ceilings. Among its key features is the ocean-view office used by Nixon, an entertainer's pavilion, and a master suite with an expanded bathroom and closet area. Formal living spaces open to a classic hacienda-style patio courtyard with a hand-painted tile fountain in its center. The missing tennis court has since been replaced with a modern one.

During Nixon's tenure as chief executive, the home was visited by such VIP guests as General Secretary of the Communist Party of the Soviet Union Leonid Brezhnev, President of Mexico Gustavo Díaz Ordaz, Prime Minister of Japan Eisaku Satō, longtime aide Henry Kissinger and close friend Bebe Rebozo.

Like Reagan’s Rancho del Cielo and George W. Bush’s Crawford Ranch, Nixon’s San Clemente retreat became a symbol of the growing importance of California in presidential politics. Given the estate's proximity to Camp Pendleton and the Pacific, the Secret Service installed advanced communication systems and perimeter surveillance, turning the home into a fully functional presidential command post.

It is an interesting historical footnote that U.S. Coast Guard LORAN Station San Mateo Point (located in southernmost San Clemente) would play a part in the Watergate scandal of the 1970s, which ultimately led to the resignation of President Nixon (ostensibly to avoid impeachment). According to the US Government Printing Office Web Site:

In May 1975, the Watergate Special Prosecution Force (WSPF) decided that it was necessary to question former President Richard M. Nixon in connection with various investigations being conducted by the WSPF. Mr. Nixon was questioned over the period of two days, June 23 and June 24, 1975, and the testimony was taken as part of various investigations being conducted by the January 7, 1974, Grand Jury for the District of Columbia (the third Watergate Grand Jury). Chief Judge George Hart signed an order authorizing that the sworn deposition of Mr. Nixon be taken at the Coast Guard Station in San Mateo, California with two members of the grand jury present.

Following the president's resignation, both he and his wife retired to the San Clemente estate, where Nixon composed his memoirs. During those years many in the local community still displayed their loyalty to the embattled former president. The Frost/Nixon interviews were originally planned for La Casa Pacifica, but radio signals from the Coast Guard's neighboring navigational-aid transmitters interfered with the TV gear; the interview had to be moved to the nearby home of a Nixon supporter.

The Nixons sold their home to Allergan founder Gavin S. Herbert and his business partners and moved to New York City in 1980 before resettling in Park Ridge, New Jersey in 1982. A strong Republican donor, Herbert kept the home as his own while developing the area around it into an enclave of individual luxury mansions.

The home has remained a private residence and was closed to the public; however, its legacy as a presidential retreat is still used as a calling card for the city of San Clemente. The road adjacent to Interstate 5 in the area is called Avenida del Presidente (Avenue of the President).

The estate sits just north of some of the West Coast's more active surfing spots, covering approximately four miles from San Onofre State Park through Lower and Upper Trestles and ending at Cotton's Point, itself being another popular wave spot on the coast.

In December 2009, the city of San Clemente passed a "Historical Property Preservation Agreement" to restore, improve, and preserve this historical building.

Gavin Herbert publicly listed La Casa Pacifica for sale in April 2015, with an asking price of $75 million. He removed the property from the market in September. He relisted the property for $69 million in April 2016 and again received no offers, withdrawing it from the market in October. In 2017 and 2018, Herbert again offered the property at a reduced price of $63.5 million. In May 2019, the property was relisted at a discounted price of $57.5 million, but it had been removed from the market by early 2020. In April 2021, it was relisted for $65 million. It was removed from the market in December 2021.

== See also ==
- List of residences of presidents of the United States
