= 2012 WTA Premier Mandatory and Premier 5 tournaments =

Women's professional tennis tour

2012 Premier Mandatory / Premier 5
Details
- Duration: February 13 – October 7
- Edition: 23rd
- Tournaments: 9

Achievements (singles)
- Most titles: (Belarus) Victoria Azarenka (3)
- Most finals: (Belarus) Victoria Azarenka (Russia) Maria Sharapova (4)

The WTA Premier Mandatory and Premier 5 tournaments, which are part of the WTA Premier tournaments, make up the elite tour for professional women's tennis organised by the WTA called the WTA Tour. There are four Premier Mandatory tournaments: Indian Wells, Miami, Madrid and Beijing and five Premier 5 tournaments: Doha, Rome, Canada, Cincinnati and Tokyo.

== Tournaments ==
| Tournament | Country | Location | Surface | Date | Prize money |
|---|---|---|---|---|---|
| Qatar Total Open | Qatar | Doha | Hard | Feb 13 – 19 | $2,168,400 |
| BNP Paribas Open | United States | Indian Wells | Hard | Mar 5 – 18 | $5,536,664 |
| Sony Ericsson Open | United States | Key Biscayne | Hard | Mar 19 – Apr 1 | $4,828,050 |
| Mutua Madrid Open | Spain | Madrid | Clay (blue) | May 7 – 13 | $5,189,603 |
| Internazionali BNL d'Italia | Italy | Rome | Clay (red) | May 14 – 20 | $2,168,400 |
| Rogers Cup p/b National Bank | Canada | Montreal | Hard | Aug 6 – 12 | $2,168,400 |
| Western & Southern Open | United States | Mason | Hard | Aug 13 – 19 | $2,168,400 |
| Toray Pan Pacific Open | Japan | Tokyo | Hard | Sep 24 – 30 | $2,168,400 |
| China Open | China | Beijing | Hard | Oct 1 – 7 | $4,828,050 |

== Results ==
* First-time champion

| Tournament | Singles champions | Runners-up | Score | Doubles champions | Runners-up | Score |
|---|---|---|---|---|---|---|
| Doha Singles – Doubles | (Belarus) Victoria Azarenka | (Australia) Samantha Stosur | 6–1, 6–2 | (United States) Liezel Huber (United States) Lisa Raymond | (United States) Raquel Kops-Jones (United States) Abigail Spears | 6–3, 6–1 |
| Indian Wells Singles – Doubles | (Belarus) Victoria Azarenka (2) | (Russia) Maria Sharapova | 6–2, 6–3 | (United States) Liezel Huber (2) (United States) Lisa Raymond (2) | (India) Sania Mirza (Russia) Elena Vesnina | 6–2, 6–3 |
| Miami Singles – Doubles | (Poland) Agnieszka Radwańska | (Russia) Maria Sharapova | 7–5, 6–4 | (Russia) Maria Kirilenko (Russia) Nadia Petrova | (Italy) Sara Errani (Italy) Roberta Vinci | 7–6^{(7–0)}, 4–6, [10–4] |
| Madrid Singles – Doubles | (United States) Serena Williams | (Belarus) Victoria Azarenka | 6–1, 6–3 | (Italy) Sara Errani* (Italy) Roberta Vinci* | (Russia) Ekaterina Makarova (Russia) Elena Vesnina | 6–1, 3–6, [10–4] |
| Rome Singles – Doubles | (Russia) Maria Sharapova | (China) Li Na | 4–6, 6–4, 7–6^{(7–5)} | (Italy) Sara Errani (2) (Italy) Roberta Vinci (2) | (Russia) Ekaterina Makarova (Russia) Elena Vesnina | 6–2, 7–5 |
| Montréal Singles – Doubles | (Czech Republic) Petra Kvitová | (China) Li Na | 7–5, 2–6, 6–3 | (Poland) Klaudia Jans-Ignacik* (France) Kristina Mladenovic* | (Russia) Nadia Petrova (Slovenia) Katarina Srebotnik | 7–5, 2–6, 6–3 |
| Cincinnati Singles – Doubles | (China) Li Na* | (Germany) Angelique Kerber | 1–6, 6–3, 6–1 | (Czech Republic) Andrea Hlaváčková* (Czech Republic) Lucie Hradecká* | (Slovenia) Katarina Srebotnik (China) Zheng Jie | 6–1, 6–3 |
| Tokyo Singles – Doubles | (Russia) Nadia Petrova | (Poland) Agnieszka Radwańska | 6–0, 1–6, 6–3 | (United States) Raquel Kops-Jones* (United States) Abigail Spears* | (Germany) Anna-Lena Grönefeld (Czech Republic) Květa Peschke | 6–1, 6–4 |
| Beijing Singles – Doubles | (Belarus) Victoria Azarenka (3) | (Russia) Maria Sharapova | 6–3, 6–1 | (Russia) Ekaterina Makarova* | (Spain) Nuria Llagostera Vives (India) Sania Mirza | 7–5, 7–5 |
| Beijing Singles – Doubles | (Belarus) Victoria Azarenka (3) | (Russia) Maria Sharapova | 6–3, 6–1 | (Russia) Elena Vesnina | (Spain) Nuria Llagostera Vives (India) Sania Mirza | 7–5, 7–5 |

== See also ==
- WTA Premier tournaments
- 2012 WTA Tour
- 2012 ATP Masters 1000
- 2012 ATP Tour
