= 2012 ATP World Tour Masters 1000 =

Men's professional tennis tour

2012 ATP Masters 1000
Details
- Duration: March 8 – November 4
- Edition: 23rd
- Tournaments: 9

Achievements (singles)
- Most titles: (Serbia) Novak Djokovic (3) (Switzerland) Roger Federer (3)
- Most finals: (Serbia) Novak Djokovic (6)

The twenty-third edition of the ATP Masters Series. The champion of each Masters event is awarded 1,000 rankings points.

== Tournaments ==
Tournament	Country	Location	Court surface	Prize money
Indian Wells Masters	USA	Indian Wells, California	Hard	$5,816,010
Miami Open	USA	Key Biscayne, Florida	Hard	$4,828,050
Monte-Carlo Masters	France	Roquebrune-Cap-Martin	Clay	€2,744,225
Madrid Open	Spain	Madrid	Clay	€3,973,695
Italian Open	Italy	Rome	Clay	€2,950,475
Canadian Open	Canada	Toronto	Hard	$3,218,700
Cincinnati Masters	USA	Mason, Ohio	Hard	$3,433,280
Shanghai Masters	China	Shanghai	Hard	$5,891,600
Paris Masters	France	Paris	Hard (indoor)	€2,950,475

== Results ==
* First-time champion

Masters	Singles champions	Runners-up	Score	Doubles champions	Runners-up	Score
Indian Wells Singles – Doubles	(Switzerland) Roger Federer	(United States) John Isner	7–6^{(9–7)}, 6–3	(Spain) Marc López (Spain) Rafael Nadal	(United States) John Isner (United States) Sam Querrey	6–2, 7–6^{(7–3)}
Miami Singles – Doubles	(Serbia) Novak Djokovic	(United Kingdom) Andy Murray	6–1, 7–6^{(7–4)}	(India) Leander Paes	(Belarus) Max Mirnyi (Canada) Daniel Nestor	3–6, 6–1, [10–8]
Miami Singles – Doubles	(Serbia) Novak Djokovic	(United Kingdom) Andy Murray	6–1, 7–6^{(7–4)}	(Czech Republic) Radek Štěpánek*	(Belarus) Max Mirnyi (Canada) Daniel Nestor	3–6, 6–1, [10–8]
Monte Carlo Singles – Doubles	(Spain) Rafael Nadal	(Serbia) Novak Djokovic	6–3, 6–1	(United States) Bob Bryan (United States) Mike Bryan	(Belarus) Max Mirnyi (Canada) Daniel Nestor	6–2, 6–3
Madrid Singles – Doubles	(Switzerland) Roger Federer	(Czech Republic) Tomáš Berdych	3–6, 7–5, 7–5	(Poland) Mariusz Fyrstenberg (Poland) Marcin Matkowski	(Sweden) Robert Lindstedt (Romania) Horia Tecău	6–3, 6–4
Rome Singles – Doubles	(Spain) Rafael Nadal	(Serbia) Novak Djokovic	7–5, 6–3	(Spain) Marcel Granollers*	(Poland) Łukasz Kubot (Serbia) Janko Tipsarević	6–3, 6–2
Rome Singles – Doubles	(Spain) Rafael Nadal	(Serbia) Novak Djokovic	7–5, 6–3	(Spain) Marc López	(Poland) Łukasz Kubot (Serbia) Janko Tipsarević	6–3, 6–2
Toronto Singles – Doubles	(Serbia) Novak Djokovic	(France) Richard Gasquet	6–3, 6–2	(United States) Bob Bryan (United States) Mike Bryan	(Spain) Marcel Granollers (Spain) Marc López	6–1, 4–6, [12–10]
Cincinnati Singles – Doubles	(Switzerland) Roger Federer	(Serbia) Novak Djokovic	6–0, 7–6^{(9–7)}	(Sweden) Robert Lindstedt* (Romania) Horia Tecău*	(India) Mahesh Bhupathi (India) Rohan Bopanna	6–4, 6–4
Shanghai Singles – Doubles	(Serbia) Novak Djokovic	(United Kingdom) Andy Murray	5–7, 7–6^{(13–11)}, 6–3	(India) Leander Paes (Czech Republic) Radek Štěpánek	(India) Mahesh Bhupathi (India) Rohan Bopanna	6–7^{(7–9)}, 6–3, [10–5]
Paris Singles – Doubles	(Spain) David Ferrer*	(Poland) Jerzy Janowicz	6–4, 6–3	(India) Mahesh Bhupathi (India) Rohan Bopanna	(Pakistan) Aisam-ul-Haq Qureshi (Netherlands) Jean-Julien Rojer	7–6^{(8–6)}, 6–3

== Tournament details ==
Key

- Q = Qualifier
- WC = Wild card
- LL = Lucky loser
- Alt = Alternate
- ITF = ITF entry
- PR = Protected ranking
- SR = Special ranking
- SE = Special exempt
- JE = Junior exempt
- JR = Junior Accelerator Programme entrant
- CO = College Accelerator Programme entrant
- NG = Next Gen Accelerator Program entrant
- w/o = Walkover
- r = Retired
- d = Defaulted

=== Indian Wells Masters ===
==== Singles ====
Quarterfinals
1	(Serbia) Novak Djokovic	6	6
12	(Spain) Nicolás Almagro	3	4
13	(France) Gilles Simon	3	6	5
11	(United States) John Isner	6	1	7
9	(Argentina) Juan Martín del Potro	3	2
3	(Switzerland) Roger Federer	6	6
(Argentina) David Nalbandian	6	5	4
2	(Spain) Rafael Nadal	4	7	6

Semifinals
1	(Serbia) Novak Djokovic	6^{7}	6	6^{5}
11	(United States) John Isner	7^{9}	3	7^{7}
3	(Switzerland) Roger Federer	6	6
2	(Spain) Rafael Nadal	3	4

Final
11	(United States) John Isner	6^{7}	3
3	(Switzerland) Roger Federer	7^{9}	6

==== Doubles ====
Semifinals
6	(Poland) Mariusz Fyrstenberg (Poland) Marcin Matkowski	2	0
(Spain) Marc López (Spain) Rafael Nadal	6	6
(United States) John Isner (United States) Sam Querrey	6	6
2	(Belarus) Max Mirnyi (Canada) Daniel Nestor	4	2

Final
(Spain) Marc López (Spain) Rafael Nadal	6	7^{7}
(United States) John Isner (United States) Sam Querrey	2	6^{3}

=== Miami Open ===
==== Singles ====
Quarterfinals
1	(Serbia) Novak Djokovic	6	7^{7}
5	(Spain) David Ferrer	2	6^{1}
21	(Argentina) Juan Mónaco	6	6
8	(United States) Mardy Fish	1	3
9	(Serbia) Janko Tipsarević	6	3	4
4	(United Kingdom) Andy Murray	4	6	6
6	(France) Jo-Wilfried Tsonga	2	7	4
2	(Spain) Rafael Nadal	6	5	6

Semifinals
1	(Serbia) Novak Djokovic	6	7^{7}
21	(Argentina) Juan Mónaco	0	6^{5}
4	(United Kingdom) Andy Murray	w/o
2	(Spain) Rafael Nadal

Final
1	(Serbia) Novak Djokovic	6	7^{7}
4	(United Kingdom) Andy Murray	1	6^{4}

==== Doubles ====
Semifinals
1	(United States) Bob Bryan (United States) Mike Bryan	4	4
7	(India) Leander Paes (Czech Republic) Radek Štěpánek	6	6
6	(India) Mahesh Bhupathi (India) Rohan Bopanna	2	4
2	(Belarus) Max Mirnyi (Canada) Daniel Nestor	6	6

Final
7	(India) Leander Paes (Czech Republic) Radek Štěpánek	3	6	[10]
2	(Belarus) Max Mirnyi (Canada) Daniel Nestor	6	1	[8]

=== Monte-Carlo Masters ===
==== Singles ====
Quarterfinals
1	(Serbia) Novak Djokovic	6	6
(Netherlands) Robin Haase	4	2
3	(United Kingdom) Andy Murray	7^{7}	2	3
6	(Czech Republic) Tomáš Berdych	6^{4}	6	6
9	(France) Gilles Simon	7	6
4	(France) Jo-Wilfried Tsonga	5	4
(Switzerland) Stanislas Wawrinka	5	4
2	(Spain) Rafael Nadal	7	6

Semifinals
1	(Serbia) Novak Djokovic	4	6	6
6	(Czech Republic) Tomáš Berdych	6	3	2
9	(France) Gilles Simon	3	4
2	(Spain) Rafael Nadal	6	6

Final
1	(Serbia) Novak Djokovic	3	1
2	(Spain) Rafael Nadal	6	6

==== Doubles ====
Semifinals
1	(United States) Bob Bryan (United States) Mike Bryan	6	7^{7}
(Spain) Marcel Granollers (Spain) Marc López	4	6^{5}
3	(France) Michaël Llodra (Serbia) Nenad Zimonjić	6	4	[5]
2	(Belarus) Max Mirnyi (Canada) Daniel Nestor	4	6	[10]

Final
1	(United States) Bob Bryan (United States) Mike Bryan	6	6
2	(Belarus) Max Mirnyi (Canada) Daniel Nestor	2	3

=== Madrid Open ===
==== Singles ====
Quarterfinals
1	(Serbia) Novak Djokovic	6^{2}	3
7	(Serbia) Janko Tipsarević	7^{7}	6
3	(Switzerland) Roger Federer	6	6
5	(Spain) David Ferrer	4	4
10	(Argentina) Juan Martín del Potro	6	6
16	(Ukraine) Alexandr Dolgopolov	3	4
6	(Czech Republic) Tomáš Berdych	6	6
15	(Spain) Fernando Verdasco	1	2

Semifinals
7	(Serbia) Janko Tipsarević	2	3
3	(Switzerland) Roger Federer	6	6
10	(Argentina) Juan Martín del Potro	6^{5}	6^{6}
6	(Czech Republic) Tomáš Berdych	7^{7}	7^{8}

Final
3	(Switzerland) Roger Federer	3	7	7
6	(Czech Republic) Tomáš Berdych	6	5	5

==== Doubles ====
Semifinals
7	(India) Mahesh Bhupathi (India) Rohan Bopanna	4	6	[7]
6	(Sweden) Robert Lindstedt (Romania) Horia Tecău	6	1	[10]
4	(Poland) Mariusz Fyrstenberg (Poland) Marcin Matkowski	6^{3}	7^{8}	[12]
2	(Belarus) Max Mirnyi (Canada) Daniel Nestor	7^{7}	6^{6}	[10]

Final
6	(Sweden) Robert Lindstedt (Romania) Horia Tecău	3	4
4	(Poland) Mariusz Fyrstenberg (Poland) Marcin Matkowski	6	6

=== Italian Open ===
==== Singles ====
Quarterfinals
1	(Serbia) Novak Djokovic	7	6
5	(France) Jo-Wilfried Tsonga	5	1
3	(Switzerland) Roger Federer	6	6
(Italy) Andreas Seppi	1	2
6	(Spain) David Ferrer	7^{7}	6
16	(France) Richard Gasquet	6^{4}	3
7	(Czech Republic) Tomáš Berdych	4	5
2	(Spain) Rafael Nadal	6	7

Semifinals
1	(Serbia) Novak Djokovic	6	7^{7}
3	(Switzerland) Roger Federer	2	6^{4}
6	(Spain) David Ferrer	6^{6}	0
2	(Spain) Rafael Nadal	7^{8}	6

Final
1	(Serbia) Novak Djokovic	5	3
2	(Spain) Rafael Nadal	7	6

==== Doubles ====
Semifinals
7	(India) Mahesh Bhupathi (India) Rohan Bopanna	4	1
(Spain) Marcel Granollers (Spain) Marc López	6	6
4	(Sweden) Robert Lindstedt (Romania) Horia Tecău	2	3
(Poland) Łukasz Kubot (Serbia) Janko Tipsarević	6	6

Final
(Spain) Marcel Granollers (Spain) Marc López	6	6
(Poland) Łukasz Kubot (Serbia) Janko Tipsarević	3	2

=== Canadian Open ===
==== Singles ====
Quarterfinals
1	(Serbia) Novak Djokovic	6	3	6
(Germany) Tommy Haas	3	6	3
(Spain) Marcel Granollers	4	4
5	(Serbia) Janko Tipsarević	6	6
11	(United States) Mardy Fish	7	1	2
14	(France) Richard Gasquet	5	6	6
8	(United States) John Isner	7^{11}	6
16	(Canada) Milos Raonic	6^{9}	4

Semifinals
1	(Serbia) Novak Djokovic	6	6
5	(Serbia) Janko Tipsarević	4	1
14	(France) Richard Gasquet	7^{7}	6
8	(United States) John Isner	6^{3}	3

Final
1	(Serbia) Novak Djokovic	6	6
14	(France) Richard Gasquet	3	2

==== Doubles ====
Semifinals
8	(Spain) Marcel Granollers (Spain) Marc López	7^{12}	7
4	(Sweden) Robert Lindstedt (Romania) Horia Tecău	6^{10}	5
5	(Austria) Jürgen Melzer (India) Leander Paes	3	4
2	(United States) Bob Bryan (United States) Mike Bryan	6	6

Final
8	(Spain) Marcel Granollers (Spain) Marc López	1	6	[10]
2	(United States) Bob Bryan (United States) Mike Bryan	6	4	[12]

=== Cincinnati Masters ===
==== Singles ====
Quarterfinals
1	(Switzerland) Roger Federer	6	7^{7}
10	(United States) Mardy Fish	3	6^{4}
(Switzerland) Stanislas Wawrinka	2	7^{7}	6
(Canada) Milos Raonic	6	6^{5}	4
6	(Argentina) Juan Martín del Potro	6	6
LL	(France) Jérémy Chardy	1	3
12	(Croatia) Marin Čilić	3	2
2	(Serbia) Novak Djokovic	6	6

Semifinals
1	(Switzerland) Roger Federer	7^{7}	6
(Switzerland) Stanislas Wawrinka	6^{4}	3
6	(Argentina) Juan Martín del Potro	3	2
2	(Serbia) Novak Djokovic	6	6

Final
1	(Switzerland) Roger Federer	6	7^{9}
2	(Serbia) Novak Djokovic	0	6^{7}

==== Doubles ====
Semifinals
(Croatia) Ivan Dodig (Brazil) Marcelo Melo	4	3
6	(India) Mahesh Bhupathi (India) Rohan Bopanna	6	6
4	(Sweden) Robert Lindstedt (Romania) Horia Tecău	7	6^{5}	[10]
2	(United States) Bob Bryan (United States) Mike Bryan	5	7^{7}	[2]

Final
6	(India) Mahesh Bhupathi (India) Rohan Bopanna	4	4
4	(Sweden) Robert Lindstedt (Romania) Horia Tecău	6	6

=== Shanghai Masters ===
==== Singles ====
Quarterfinals
1	(Switzerland) Roger Federer	6	6
10	(Croatia) Marin Čilić	3	4
3	(United Kingdom) Andy Murray	4	6	6
(Czech Republic) Radek Štěpánek	6	2	3
5	(France) Jo-Wilfried Tsonga	3	6^{4}
4	(Czech Republic) Tomáš Berdych	6	7^{7}
(Germany) Tommy Haas	3	3
2	(Serbia) Novak Djokovic	6	6

Semifinals
1	(Switzerland) Roger Federer	4	4
3	(United Kingdom) Andy Murray	6	6
4	(Czech Republic) Tomáš Berdych	3	4
2	(Serbia) Novak Djokovic	6	6

Final
3	(United Kingdom) Andy Murray	7	6^{11}	3
2	(Serbia) Novak Djokovic	5	7^{13}	6

==== Doubles ====
Semifinals
(Croatia) Marin Čilić (Brazil) Marcelo Melo	0	2
4	(India) Leander Paes (Czech Republic) Radek Štěpánek	6	6
(United Kingdom) Colin Fleming (United Kingdom) Ross Hutchins	7^{7}	3	[8]
7	(India) Mahesh Bhupathi (India) Rohan Bopanna	6^{4}	6	[10]

Final
4	(India) Leander Paes (Czech Republic) Radek Štěpánek	6^{7}	6	[10]
7	(India) Mahesh Bhupathi (India) Rohan Bopanna	7^{9}	3	[5]

=== Paris Masters ===
==== Singles ====
Quarterfinals
(France) Gilles Simon	6	6
5	(Czech Republic) Tomáš Berdych	4	4
Q	(Poland) Jerzy Janowicz	3	6	4
8	(Serbia) Janko Tipsarević	6	1	1^{r}
6	(France) Jo-Wilfried Tsonga	2	5
4	(Spain) David Ferrer	6	7
WC	(France) Michaël Llodra	7^{7}	6
(United States) Sam Querrey	6^{4}	3

Semifinals
(France) Gilles Simon	4	5
Q	(Poland) Jerzy Janowicz	6	7
4	(Spain) David Ferrer	7	6
WC	(France) Michaël Llodra	5	3

Final
Q	(Poland) Jerzy Janowicz	4	3
4	(Spain) David Ferrer	6	6

==== Doubles ====
Semifinals
(Australia) Paul Hanley (United Kingdom) Jonathan Marray	7	6
5	(India) Mahesh Bhupathi (India) Rohan Bopanna	5	3
(Croatia) Marin Čilić (Brazil) Marcelo Melo	6	4	[9]
7	(Pakistan) Aisam-ul-Haq Qureshi (Netherlands) Jean-Julien Rojer	0	6	[11]

Final
5	(India) Mahesh Bhupathi (India) Rohan Bopanna	7^{8}	6
7	(Pakistan) Aisam-ul-Haq Qureshi (Netherlands) Jean-Julien Rojer	6^{6}	3

== See also ==
- ATP Tour Masters 1000
- 2012 ATP Tour
- 2012 WTA Premier Mandatory and Premier 5 tournaments
- 2012 WTA Tour
