= Blue Heron Farm =

Estate in the USA

Blue Heron Farm is a 28-acre (11 ha)+ estate on Martha's Vineyard in Chilmark, Massachusetts, United States, that served as a summer vacation place – the "Summer White House" – to President Barack Obama and his family during his presidency in 2009, 2010, and 2011. Later, the property was owned by the British architect Norman Foster and his wife Elena Ochoa Foster.

== Description and ownership ==
Much of the land of the estate including the main house from 1961 was acquired by M. Anthony Fisher for $1.3 million in 1991. Further property was added and existing structures were renovated and new ones added over time. The estate fronts Tisbury Great Pond with a private beach, has two full-sized homes, a barn brought in from Pennsylvania, a pool area, and a boathouse. There are gardens, a tennis court, a riding ring, bocce and basketball courts, and an apple orchard on the property.

After the death of Fisher and his wife due to an airplane accident, the place was bought by William Van Devender for $20.35 million in 2005. In 2006 the 6,967-square-foot (647.3 m^{2}) main house with its six bedrooms was renovated. The estate was sold to the Fosters in 2011 for $21.9 million. In 2018 it was reported to have been sold as a 9.5-acre (3.8 ha) property to a realty trust for $15 million.

== See also ==
- List of residences of presidents of the United States
