= Robert Abplanalp =

American inventor and engineer

Robert Henry Abplanalp, (KHS) (April 4, 1922 – August 30, 2003) was an American inventor and engineer who invented the modern form of the aerosol spray valve, the founder of Precision Valve Corporation, a Republican political activist, and a close confidant of Richard Nixon.

== Biography ==
Born to Swiss immigrant parents in the Bronx, New York, Abplanalp graduated from Fordham Preparatory School in 1939 (he rescued the school from financial distress in 1978) and studied mechanical engineering at Villanova University. He ran a small machine shop prior to entering the United States Army in 1943. After serving in World War II he worked in his machine shop where he invented a practical aerosol valve that could be mass-produced inexpensively. He began the Precision Valve Corporation in 1949, and, by 1950, 15,000,000 valves had been produced, marking the beginning of his business empire.

In 1956, he married Josephine Sloboda. The couple had two children. Later in life he became a Republican and supported many conservative causes. Abplanalp was a close friend and supporter of former US President Richard M. Nixon, Nixon's immediate family, and Nixon's long-time confidant, Charles "Bebe" Rebozo. Abplanalp owned the lease to Walker's Cay for many years. He supported sports fishing as well as conservation. On at least one occasion he took his Grumman seaplane to the island. Abplanalp and his wife were generous donors to Catholic charities, in recognition of which they were inducted in 1971 into two charitable orders — the Order of Malta and the Order of the Holy Sepulchre.

In 1974 University of California, Irvine chemist Frank Sherwood Rowland suggested that long-lived organic halogen compounds, such as the CFCs then widely used to pressurize spray cans, would reach the stratosphere where they would be dissociated by UV light, releasing chlorine atoms. Abplanalp wrote to the Chancellor of UC Irvine to complain about Rowland's public statements.

At the time of Abplanalp's death in Bronxville, New York from lung cancer on August 30, 2003, age 81, he held more than 300 aerosol-related patents. He is interred at the Gate of Heaven Cemetery in Hawthorne, New York.

== Association with Richard Nixon ==
One of the central national issues in the Watergate scandal was a set of allegations that President Richard M. Nixon's administration had taken official action in response to money given to him or to his political organizations. Nixon's close friends Bebe Rebozo and Abplanalp found themselves mentioned in relation to allegations of misuse of campaign funds and secret presidential slush funds. Abplanalp purchased a house in Key Biscayne, Florida, next to the home of Rebozo, for use by the Secret Service during presidential visits to Rebozo's home. At the time of the Watergate burglary in June 1972, Nixon was vacationing at Abplanalp's island in the Bahamas.
