= List of residences of presidents of the United States =

Listed below are the private residences of the various presidents of the United States. Except for George Washington, all of them also lived at the White House (Executive Residence). For a list of official residences, see President of the United States § Residence.

== Private homes of the presidents ==
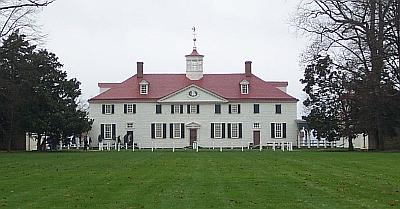
Mount Vernon, George Washington's Fairfax County, Virginia plantation home

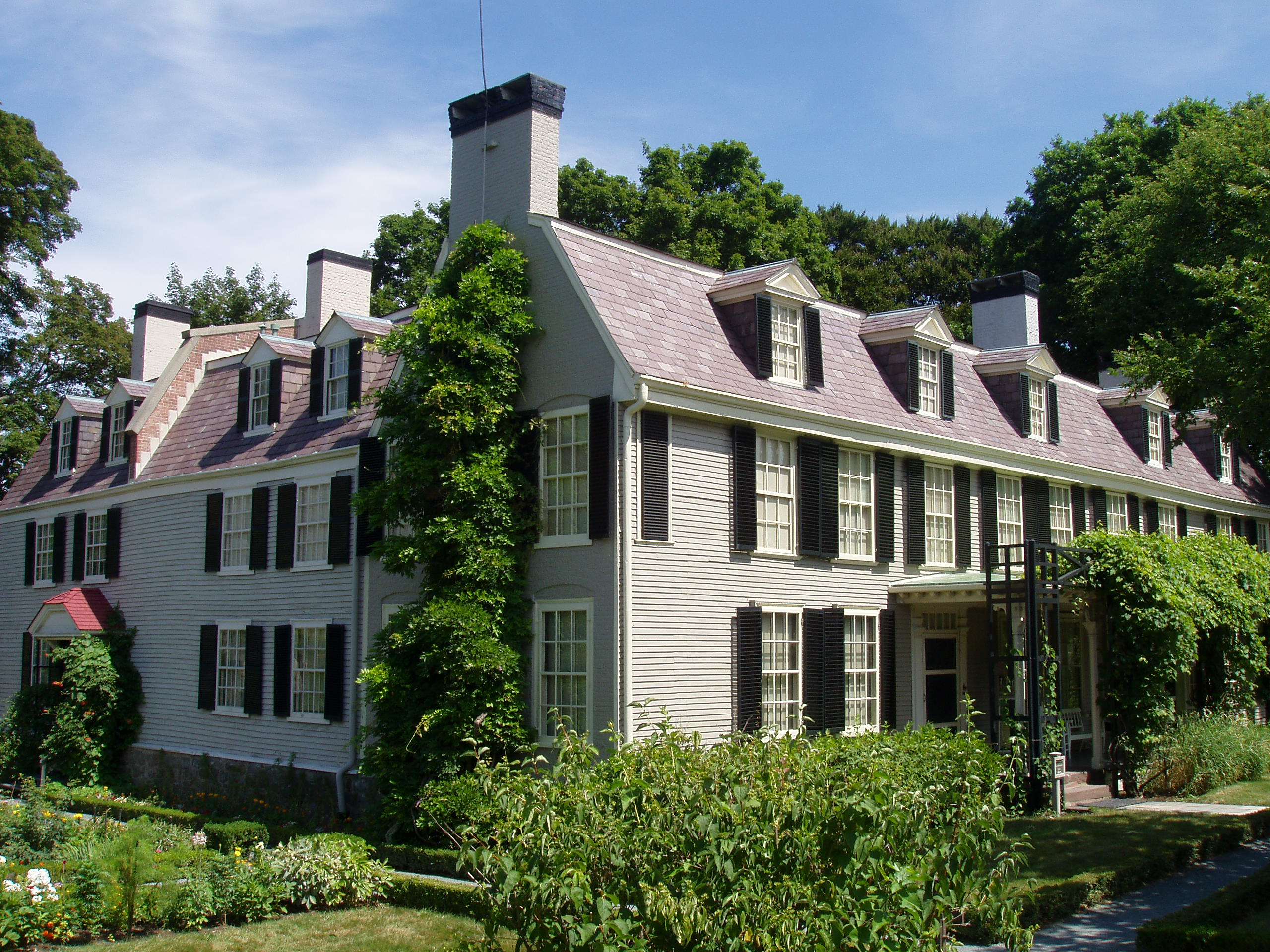
Peacefield, the home of John Adams and John Quincy Adams in Quincy, Massachusetts

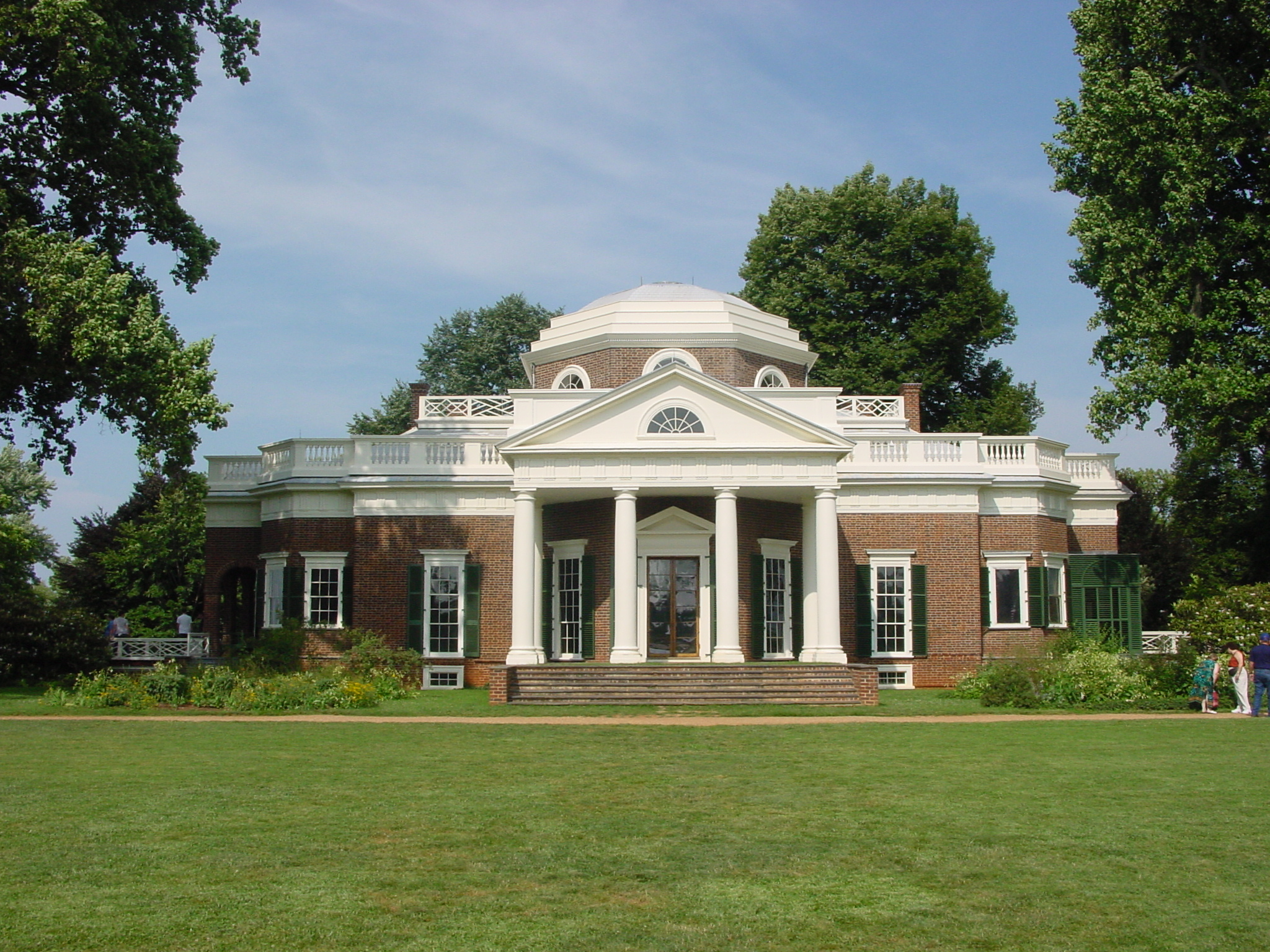
Monticello, Thomas Jefferson's Albemarle County, Virginia plantation home; appears on the back of the U.S. nickel

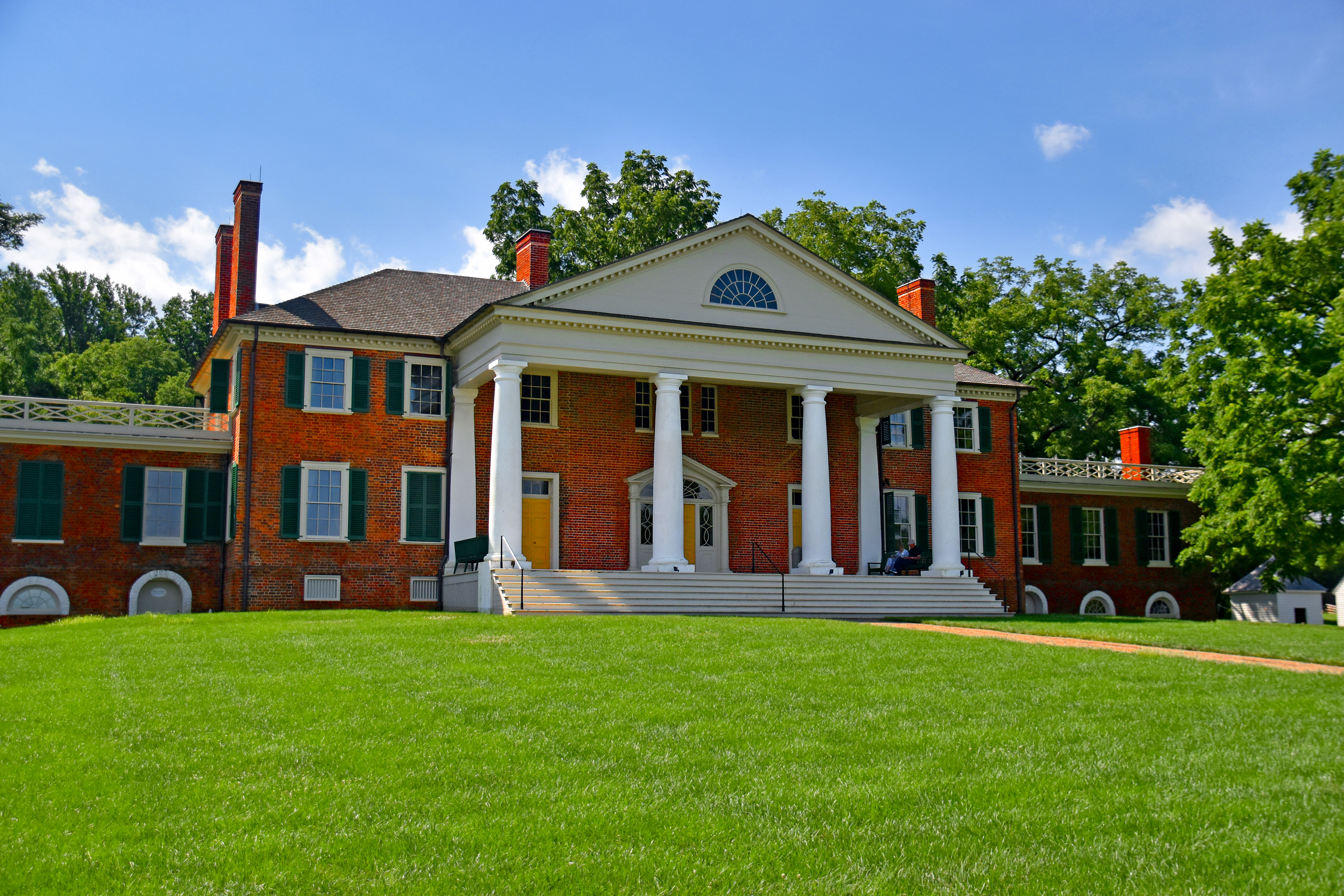
Montpelier, James Madison's Orange County, Virginia plantation home

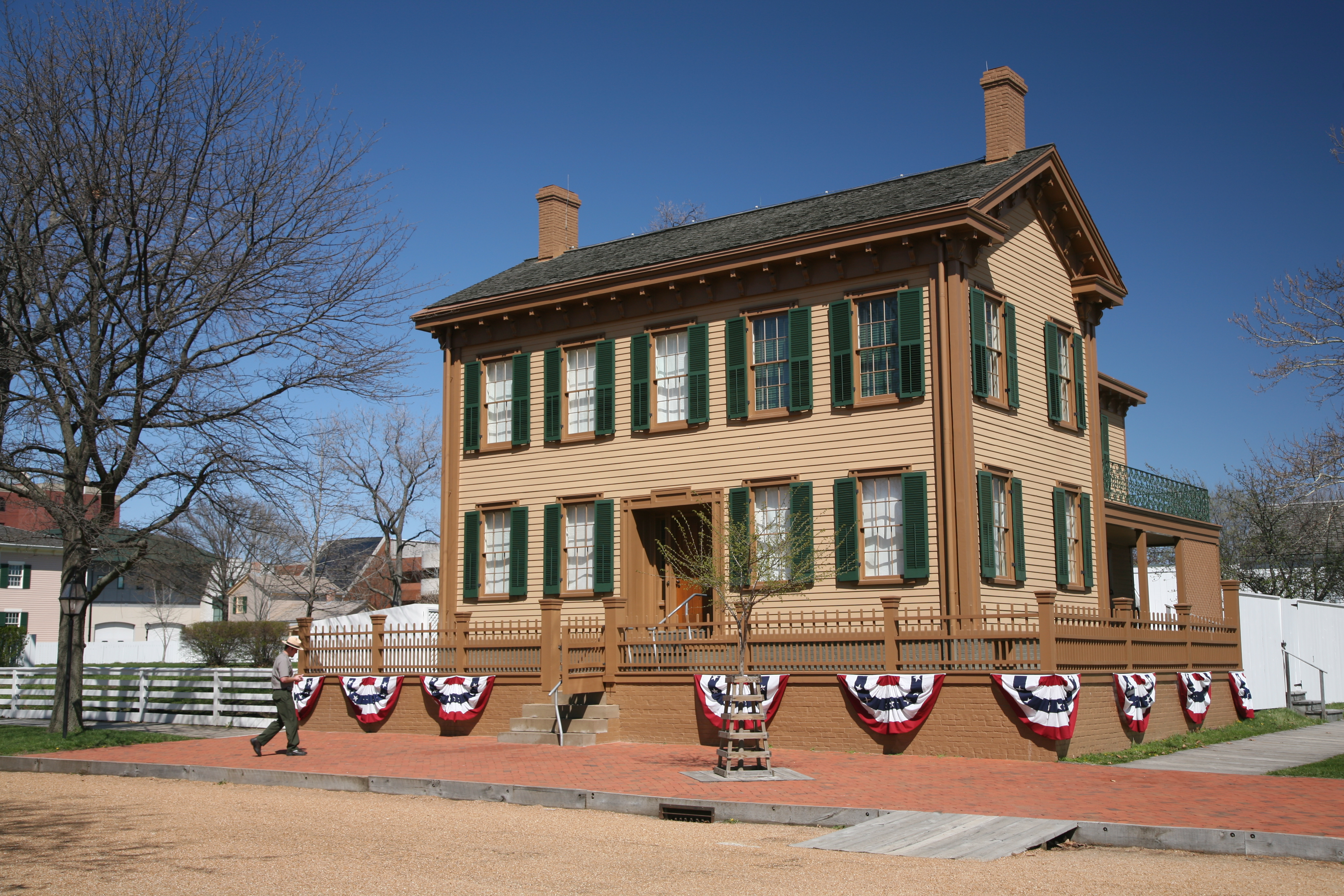
Lincoln Home, Abraham Lincoln's Springfield, Illinois home

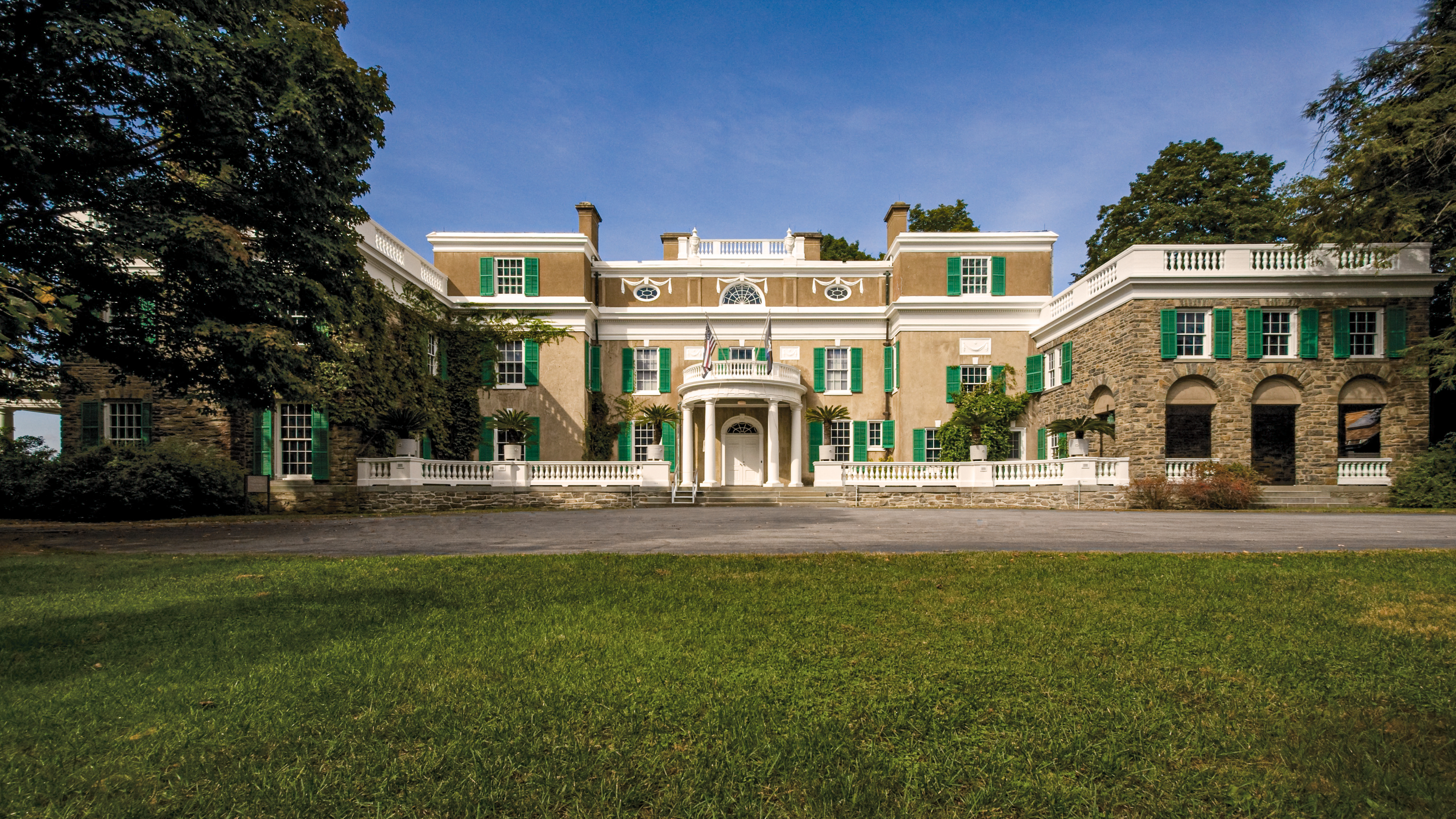
Springwood, Franklin D. Roosevelt's Hyde Park, New York home

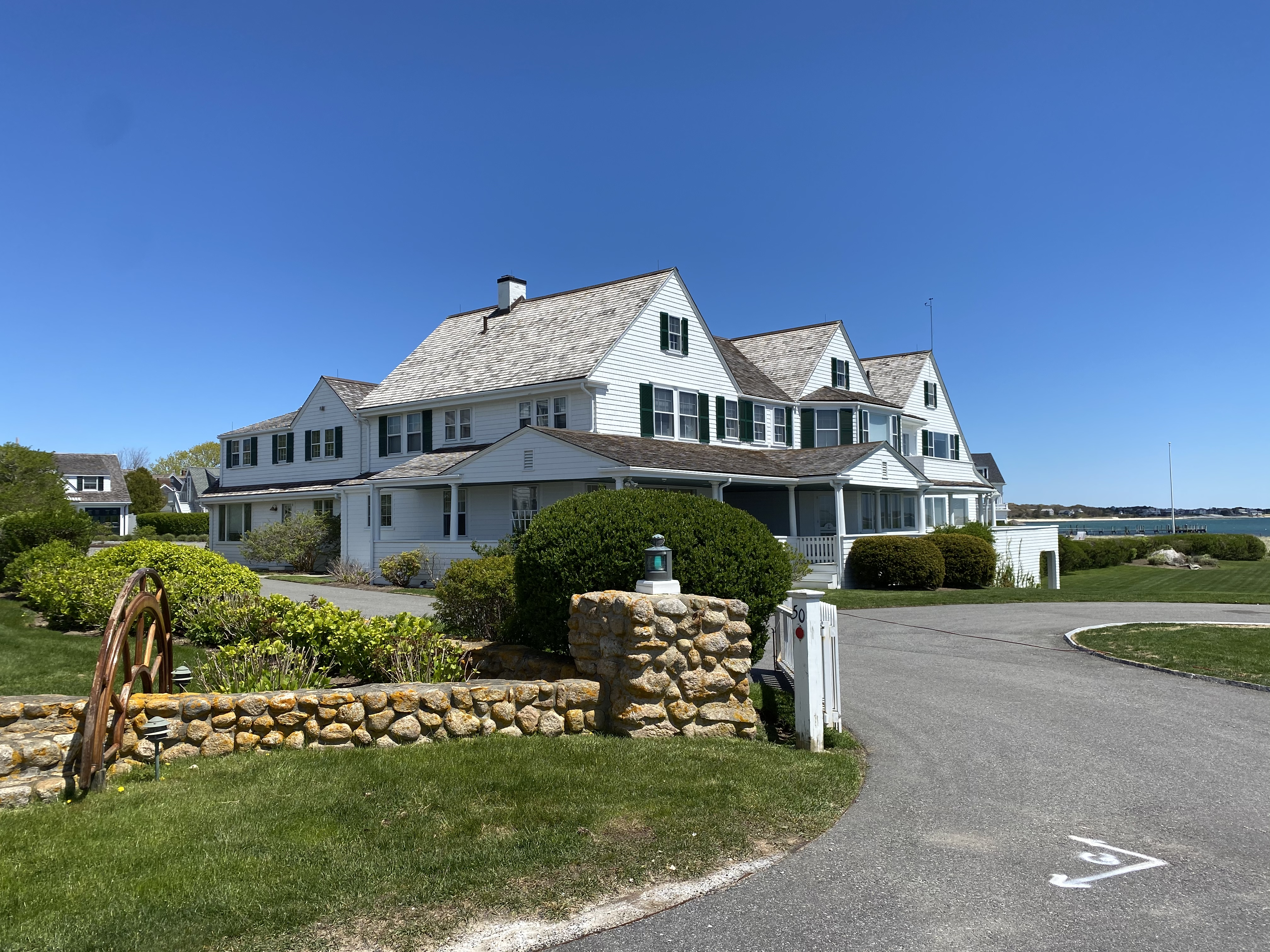
The Kennedy Compound, John F. Kennedy's Hyannis Port, Massachusetts home

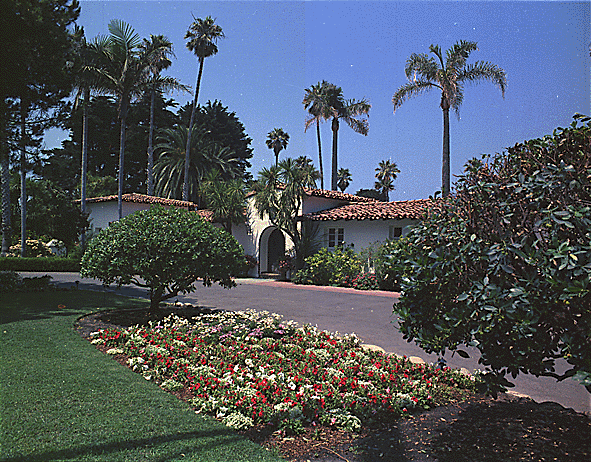
La Casa Pacifica, Richard Nixon's San Clemente, California home

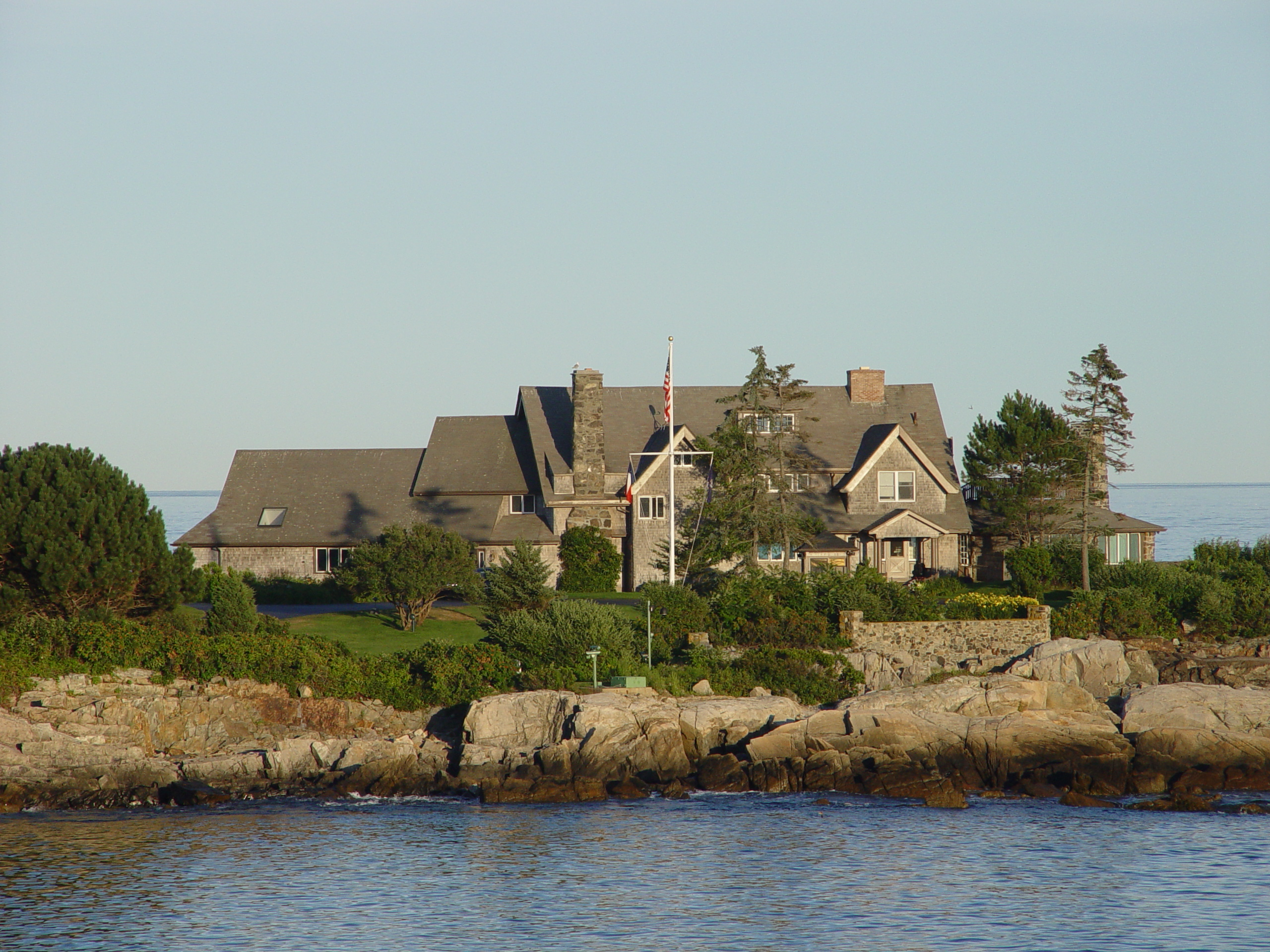
Walker's Point, George H. W. Bush's Kennebunkport, Maine home

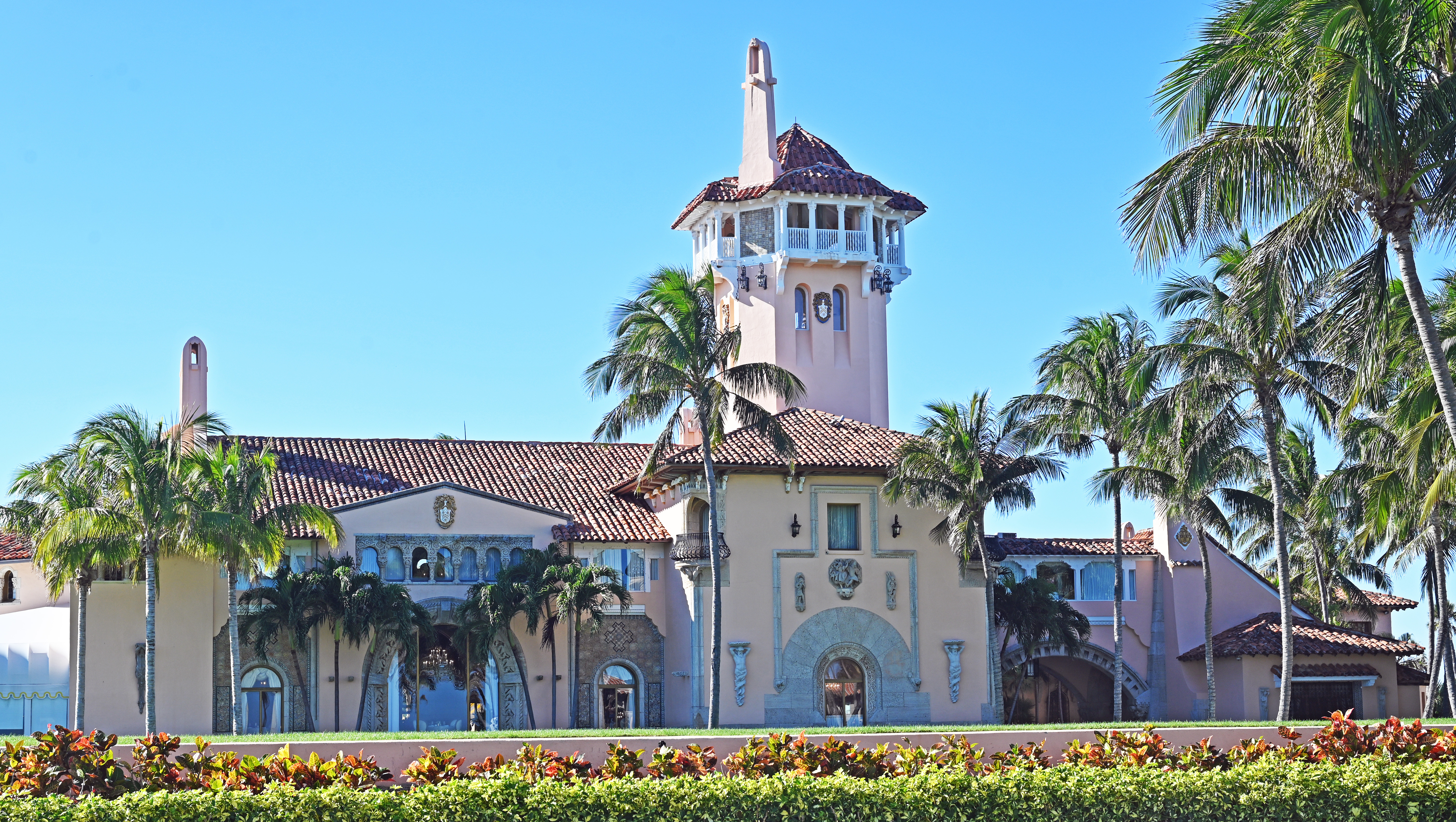
Mar-a-Lago, Donald Trump's Palm Beach, Florida home

This is a list of notable homes where presidents resided with their families.

Order	President	Location
1	George Washington	George Washington Birthplace, Westmoreland County, Virginia; Ferry Farm, Stafford County, Virginia; Mount Vernon, Mount Vernon, Virginia
2	John Adams	John Adams Birthplace, Quincy, Massachusetts; Family home, Quincy, Massachusetts; Peacefield, Quincy, Massachusetts
3	Thomas Jefferson	Monticello, Charlottesville, Virginia; Poplar Forest, Forest, Virginia
4	James Madison	Belle Grove, Port Conway, Virginia; Montpelier, Orange County, Virginia
5	James Monroe	Ash Lawn-Highland, Charlottesville, Virginia, Oak Hill, Leesburg, Virginia
6	John Quincy Adams	Birthplace and childhood home, Quincy, Massachusetts; Peacefield, Quincy, Massachusetts
7	Andrew Jackson	The Hermitage, Hermitage, Tennessee
8	Martin Van Buren	Decatur House, Washington, D.C. Lindenwald, Kinderhook, New York
9	William Henry Harrison	Berkeley Plantation, Charles City County, Virginia; Grouseland, Vincennes, Indiana
10	John Tyler	Greenway Plantation, Charles City County, Virginia; Sherwood Forest Plantation, Charles City County, Virginia
11	James K. Polk	James K. Polk Birthplace Home, Pineville, North Carolina; James K. Polk Home, Columbia, Tennessee; Polk Place, Nashville, Tennessee (demolished)
12	Zachary Taylor	Springfield, Louisville, Kentucky
13	Millard Fillmore	Fillmore House, East Aurora, New York
14	Franklin Pierce	Franklin Pierce Homestead, Hillsborough, New Hampshire; Pierce Manse, Concord, New Hampshire
15	James Buchanan	Wheatland, Lancaster, Pennsylvania
16	Abraham Lincoln	Abraham Lincoln Birthplace, Hodgenville, Kentucky; Lincoln Boyhood National Memorial, Lincoln City, Indiana; Lincoln Home, Springfield, Illinois
17	Andrew Johnson	Mordecai House, Raleigh, North Carolina; Andrew Johnson Home, Greeneville, Tennessee
18	Ulysses S. Grant	Grant Birthplace, Point Pleasant, Ohio; Ulysses S. Grant Home, Galena, Illinois; Grant Boyhood Home, Georgetown, Ohio; Grant's Farm, Grantwood Village, Missouri; 3 East 66th Street, New York City (demolished); Grant Cottage, Moreau, New York
19	Rutherford B. Hayes	Spiegel Grove, Fremont, Ohio
20	James A. Garfield	Lawnfield, Mentor, Ohio
21	Chester A. Arthur	Chester Arthur Birthplace, Fairfield, Vermont; Chester A. Arthur Home, New York City, New York
22/24	Grover Cleveland	Grover Cleveland Birthplace, Caldwell, New Jersey; Westland Mansion, Princeton, New Jersey
23	Benjamin Harrison	Benjamin Harrison Home, Indianapolis, Indiana
25	William McKinley	William McKinley Birthplace, Niles, Ohio
26	Theodore Roosevelt	Theodore Roosevelt Birthplace, New York City, New York; Sagamore Hill, Cove Neck, New York; Pine Knot cabin, Albemarle County, Virginia; Maltese Cross Cabin, Medora, North Dakota; Elkhorn Ranch, Billings County, North Dakota (demolished)
27	William Howard Taft	Taft House, Cincinnati, Ohio
28	Woodrow Wilson	Woodrow Wilson Birthplace, Staunton, Virginia; Woodrow Wilson Boyhood Home (Georgia), Augusta, Georgia; Woodrow Wilson Boyhood Home (South Carolina), Columbia, South Carolina; Woodrow Wilson House, Washington, D.C. Prospect House, Princeton, New Jersey
29	Warren G. Harding	Warren G. Harding House, Marion, Ohio
30	Calvin Coolidge	Coolidge Homestead, Plymouth Notch, Vermont; Calvin Coolidge House, Northampton, Massachusetts
31	Herbert Hoover	Herbert Hoover National Historic Site, West Branch, Iowa; Lou Henry and Herbert Hoover House, Stanford, California; Waldorf Astoria New York, New York City, New York
32	Franklin D. Roosevelt	Springwood, Hyde Park, New York; Roosevelt Cottage, Campobello Island, New Brunswick, Canada; Little White House, Warm Springs, Georgia
33	Harry S. Truman	Harry S Truman Birthplace, Lamar, Missouri; Truman Home, Independence, Missouri
34	Dwight D. Eisenhower	Eisenhower Birthplace, Denison, Texas; Eisenhower Boyhood Home, Abilene, Kansas; Eisenhower Farm, Gettysburg, Pennsylvania
35	John F. Kennedy	John F. Kennedy Birthplace, Brookline, Massachusetts; Hickory Hill, McLean, Virginia; Kennedy Compound, Hyannis Port, Massachusetts; Wexford, Marshall, Virginia
36	Lyndon B. Johnson	LBJ Ranch, Stonewall, Texas
37	Richard Nixon	Childhood home, Yorba Linda, California; La Casa Pacifica, San Clemente, California
38	Gerald Ford	Gerald Ford Birthplace, Omaha, Nebraska (demolished); Gerald R. Ford Jr. House, Alexandria, Virginia, President Gerald R. Ford Jr. Boyhood Home, Grand Rapids, Michigan
39	Jimmy Carter	Jimmy Carter Boyhood Farm, Plains, Georgia; Jimmy and Rosalynn Carter House, Plains, Georgia
40	Ronald Reagan	Graham Building, Tampico, Illinois; H. C. Pitney Variety Store Building, Tampico Ronald Reagan Boyhood Home, Dixon, Illinois; General Electric Showcase House, Pacific Palisades, Los Angeles (demolished); Rancho del Cielo, Santa Barbara, California; 668 St. Cloud Road, Bel Air, Los Angeles
41	George H. W. Bush	Bush Family Home, Midland, Texas; Walker's Point, Kennebunkport, Maine
42	Bill Clinton	Childhood home, Hope, Arkansas; Clinton House, Fayetteville, Arkansas; 15 Old House Lane, Chappaqua, New York
43	George W. Bush	Bush Family Home, Midland, Texas; Prairie Chapel Ranch, Crawford, Texas
44	Barack Obama	5046 South Greenwood Avenue, Kenwood, Chicago
45/47	Donald Trump	Childhood homes, Queens, New York City; Penthouse apartment, Trump Tower, New York City; Mar-a-Lago, Palm Beach, Florida; See Residences of Donald Trump
46	Joe Biden	1209 Barley Mill Road, Greenville, Delaware; 32 Far View Road, North Shores, Delaware

== Presidential vacation homes ==
During their term of office, many presidents have owned or leased vacation homes in various parts of the country, which are often called by journalists the "Western White House", "Summer White House", or "Winter White House", depending on location or season.

=== Summer White House ===
The "Summer White House" is typically the name given to the summer vacation residence of the sitting president of the United States aside from Camp David, the mountain-based military camp in Frederick County, Maryland, used as a country retreat and for high-alert protection of presidents and their guests.

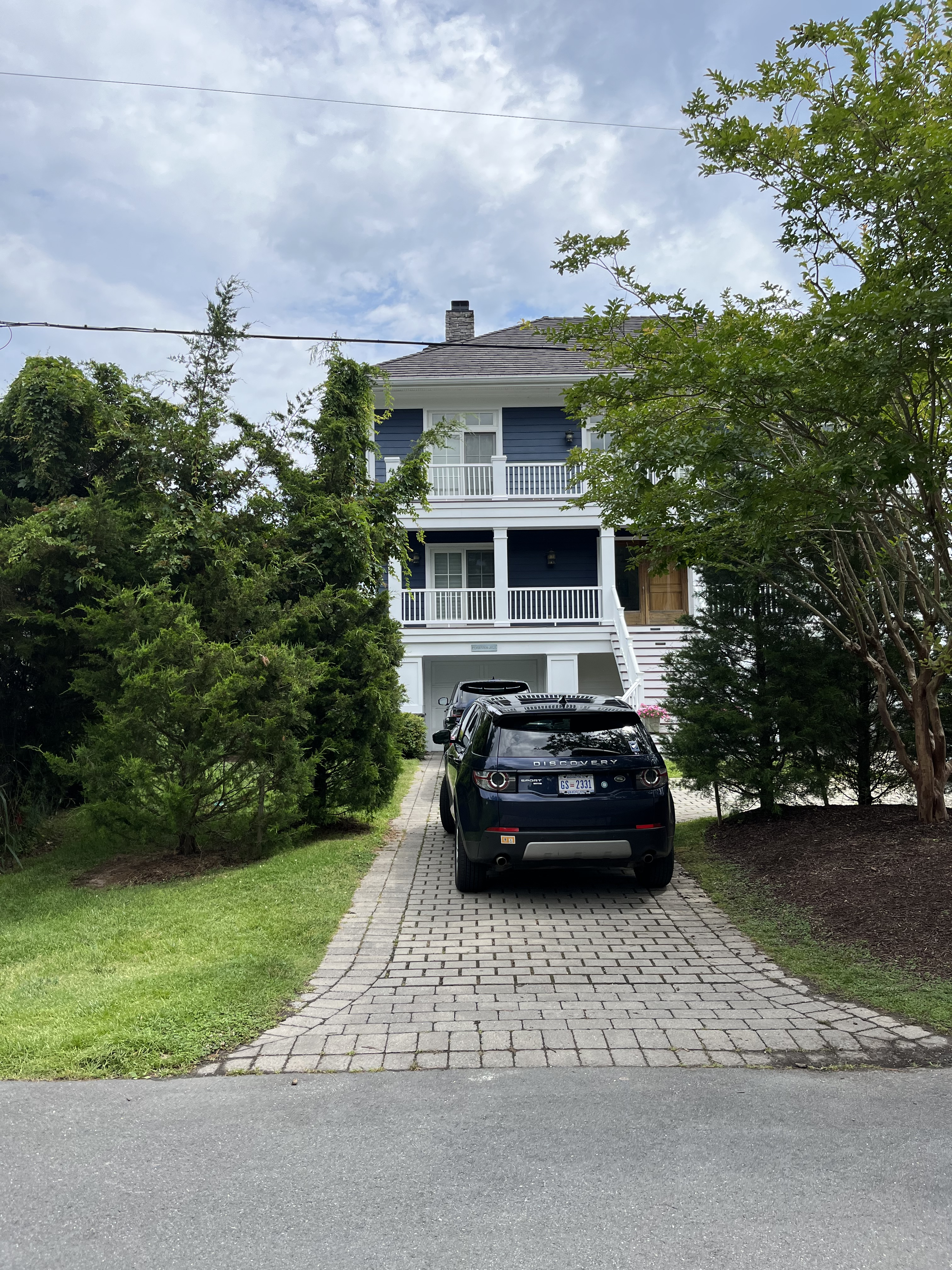
President Joe Biden and First Lady Jill Biden's beach house in the North Shores, Delaware neighborhood which served as their Summer White House; photo taken in 2022.

Years	President	Property name	Location
1789–1797	George Washington	Mount Vernon	Fairfax County, Virginia
1793–1794	George Washington	Deshler-Morris House	Philadelphia, Pennsylvania
1805–1808	Thomas Jefferson	Poplar Forest	Forest, Virginia
1853–1857	Franklin Pierce	48 Central Street	Andover, Massachusetts
1857–1860	James Buchanan	Bedford Springs Hotel	Bedford, Pennsylvania
1862–1864	Abraham Lincoln	Cottage at the Soldiers' Home	Washington, D.C.
1869–1876	Ulysses S. Grant	Ulysses S. Grant Cottage	Long Branch, New Jersey
1877–1881	Rutherford B. Hayes	Spiegel Grove	Fremont, Ohio
1886–1888	Grover Cleveland	Oak View Upon Red Top	Washington, D.C.
1887–1888	Grover Cleveland	Wateridge	Marion, Massachusetts
1889–1892	Benjamin Harrison	Congress Hall	Cape May, New Jersey
1893–1896	Grover Cleveland	Gray Gables	Bourne, Massachusetts
1893–1896	Grover Cleveland	Woodley	Washington, D.C.
1897, 1899	William McKinley	Hotel Champlain	Plattsburgh, New York
1901–1908	Theodore Roosevelt	Sagamore Hill	Cove Neck, New York
1909–1910	William Howard Taft	Stetson Cottage	Beverly, Massachusetts
1911–1912	William Howard Taft	Parramatta	Beverly, Massachusetts
1913–1915	Woodrow Wilson	Harlakenden	Cornish, New Hampshire
1916	Woodrow Wilson	Shadow Lawn	West Long Branch, New Jersey
1924	Calvin Coolidge	Coolidge Homestead	Plymouth Notch, Vermont
1925	Calvin Coolidge	White Court	Swampscott, Massachusetts
1926	Calvin Coolidge	White Pine Camp	Paul Smiths, New York
1927	Calvin Coolidge	Custer State Park	Custer County, South Dakota
1928	Calvin Coolidge	Cedar Island Lodge	Brule, Wisconsin
1929–1932	Herbert Hoover	Rapidan Camp	Madison County, Virginia
1933–1939	Franklin D. Roosevelt	Roosevelt Cottage	Campobello, New Brunswick
1933–1944	Franklin D. Roosevelt	Little White House	Warm Springs, Georgia
1933–1944	Franklin D. Roosevelt	Springwood	Hyde Park, New York
1946-1948	Harry S. Truman	Little White House	Key West, Florida
1953–1955	Dwight D. Eisenhower	Lowry Air Force Base	Denver, Colorado
1958–1960	Dwight D. Eisenhower	Commandant's Residence, Fort Adams	Newport, Rhode Island
1961–1963	John F. Kennedy	Hammersmith Farm	Newport, Rhode Island
1961–1963	John F. Kennedy	Kennedy Compound	Hyannis Port, Massachusetts
1964–1968	Lyndon B. Johnson	LBJ Ranch	Gillespie County, Texas
1969–1974	Richard Nixon	Florida White House	Key Biscayne, Florida
1969–1974	Richard Nixon	La Casa Pacifica	San Clemente, California
1974–1977	Gerald Ford	Firestone Residence	Palm Springs, California
1977–1980	Jimmy Carter	209 Woodland Drive	Plains, Georgia
1981–1988	Ronald Reagan	Rancho del Cielo	Santa Barbara, California
1989–1992	George H. W. Bush	Walker's Point Estate	Kennebunkport, Maine
1998–1999	Bill Clinton	Georgica Pond	East Hampton, New York
2001–2008	George W. Bush	Prairie Chapel Ranch	Crawford, Texas
2009–2012	Barack Obama	Blue Heron Farm	Martha's Vineyard, Massachusetts
2013	Barack Obama	Chilmark House	Martha's Vineyard, Massachusetts
2017–2020; 2025–present	Donald Trump	Trump National Bedminster	Bedminster, New Jersey
2021–2025	Joe Biden	Biden Beach House	North Shores, Delaware

=== Winter White House ===
A "Winter White House" is typically the name given to the winter vacation residence of the sitting president of the United States aside from Camp David, the mountain-based military camp in Frederick County, Maryland, used as a country retreat and for high-alert protection of the president and his guests.

Although Harry Truman and John F. Kennedy had spent significant time in Florida (Harry Truman having spent time there in the summer), Richard Nixon's Florida White House was the first that reporters called the "Winter White House".

Years	President	Property name	Location
1912–1913	Woodrow Wilson	Beaulieu (John M. Ayer Estate, Dixie White House)	Pass Christian, Mississippi
1921–1923 (Note: Harding died before he could vacation in Bird Key.)	Warren G. Harding	John Ringling Estate	Bird Key, Florida
1923–1929	Calvin Coolidge	Howard E. Coffin Estate	Sapelo Island, Georgia
1933–1945	Franklin D. Roosevelt	Little White House	Warm Springs, Georgia
1945–1953	Harry S. Truman	Harry S. Truman Little White House	Key West, Florida
1953–1961	Dwight D. Eisenhower	Eisenhower Cabin, Augusta National Golf Club	Augusta, Georgia
1961–1963	John F. Kennedy	La Querida	Palm Beach, Florida
1969–1974	Richard Nixon	Nixon's Florida White House	Key Biscayne, Florida
2009–2017	Barack Obama	Plantation Estate	Kailua, Honolulu County, Hawaii
2017–2021; 2025–Present	Donald Trump	Mar-a-Lago	Palm Beach, Florida

=== Western/Southern White House ===
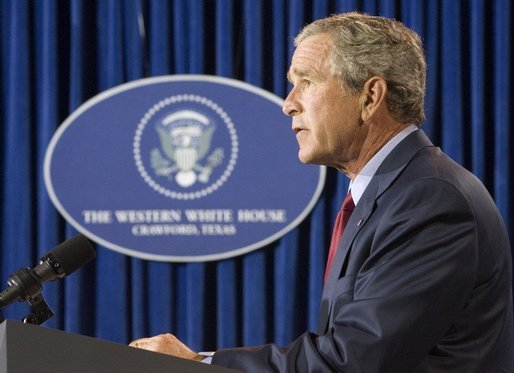
President George W. Bush speaks to the press from his Crawford, Texas ranch on Sunday August 28, 2005. The logo in the background was created by the Bush administration in August 2001, and it was displayed at press briefings during Bush's stays at his ranch in Crawford. The sign reads: THE WESTERN WHITE HOUSE CRAWFORD, TEXAS

The Western White House and Southern White House are terms sometimes applied to additional residences of the president, especially when those residences are very distant from the District of Columbia. Famous examples include Donald Trump's Mar-a-Lago resort in Palm Beach, Florida, as well as George W. Bush's Prairie Chapel Ranch in Crawford, Texas; Lyndon B. Johnson, Richard Nixon and Ronald Reagan have also used the term for their private residences (Nixon and Reagan in California, Johnson in Texas).

=== Other secondary "White Houses" ===
The first governmental spending on property improvements of private presidential residences was at Dwight Eisenhower's Gettysburg farm, where the Secret Service added three guard posts to a fence. Federal law now allows the president to designate a residence outside of the White House as his temporary offices, so that federal money can be used to provide required facilities.

== Other official residences occupied by presidents ==
=== Official residences occupied while in other offices ===
This is a list of official residences occupied by individuals who later served as presidents with their families while they served in the office related to the residence.

Order	President	Residence	Related office
10	John Tyler	Executive Mansion (Richmond, Virginia)	Governor of Virginia (served 1825–1827)
15	James Buchanan	Old American Chancery (Great Cumberland Place, London)	United States Minister to the United Kingdom (served 1853–1856)
22/24	Grover Cleveland	New York State Executive Mansion (Albany, New York)	Governor of New York (served 1883–1885)
26	Theodore Roosevelt	New York State Executive Mansion (Albany, New York)	Governor of New York (served 1899–1900)
27	William Howard Taft	Malacañang Palace (Manila, Philippines)	Governor-General of the Philippines (served 1901–1903)
28	Woodrow Wilson	Prospect House, Princeton, New Jersey	President of Princeton University (served 1902–1910)
32	Franklin D. Roosevelt	New York State Executive Mansion (Albany, New York)	Governor of New York (served 1929–1932)
39	Jimmy Carter	Georgia Governor's Mansion (Atlanta, Georgia)	Governor of Georgia (served 1971–1975)
41	George H. W. Bush	Residence of the United States Ambassador to the United Nations (New York City)	United States Ambassador to the United Nations (served 1971–1973)
41	George H. W. Bush	Number One Observatory Circle (Washington, D.C.)	Vice President of the United States (served 1981–1989)
42	Bill Clinton	Arkansas Governor's Mansion (Little Rock, Arkansas)	Governor of Arkansas (served 1979–1981 and 1983–1992)
43	George W. Bush	Texas Governor's Mansion (Austin, Texas)	Governor of Texas (served 1995–2000)
46	Joe Biden	Number One Observatory Circle (Washington, D.C.)	Vice President of the United States (served 2009–2017)

=== Official residences occupied by presidents while another member of their family served in other offices ===
This is a list of official residences occupied by presidents with their families (before or after their term of office) while another member of their family served in the office related to the residence.

Order	President	Residence	Notes
9	William Henry Harrison	Executive Mansion (Richmond, Virginia)	Resided there during tenure of his father, Benjamin Harrison V, as governor of Virginia

== See also ==
- Presidential memorials in the United States
- Plantations of Andrew Jackson
