= Clinton House (Fayetteville, Arkansas) =

Historic house in Arkansas, United States

- Clinton House Museum
- U.S. National Register of Historic Places
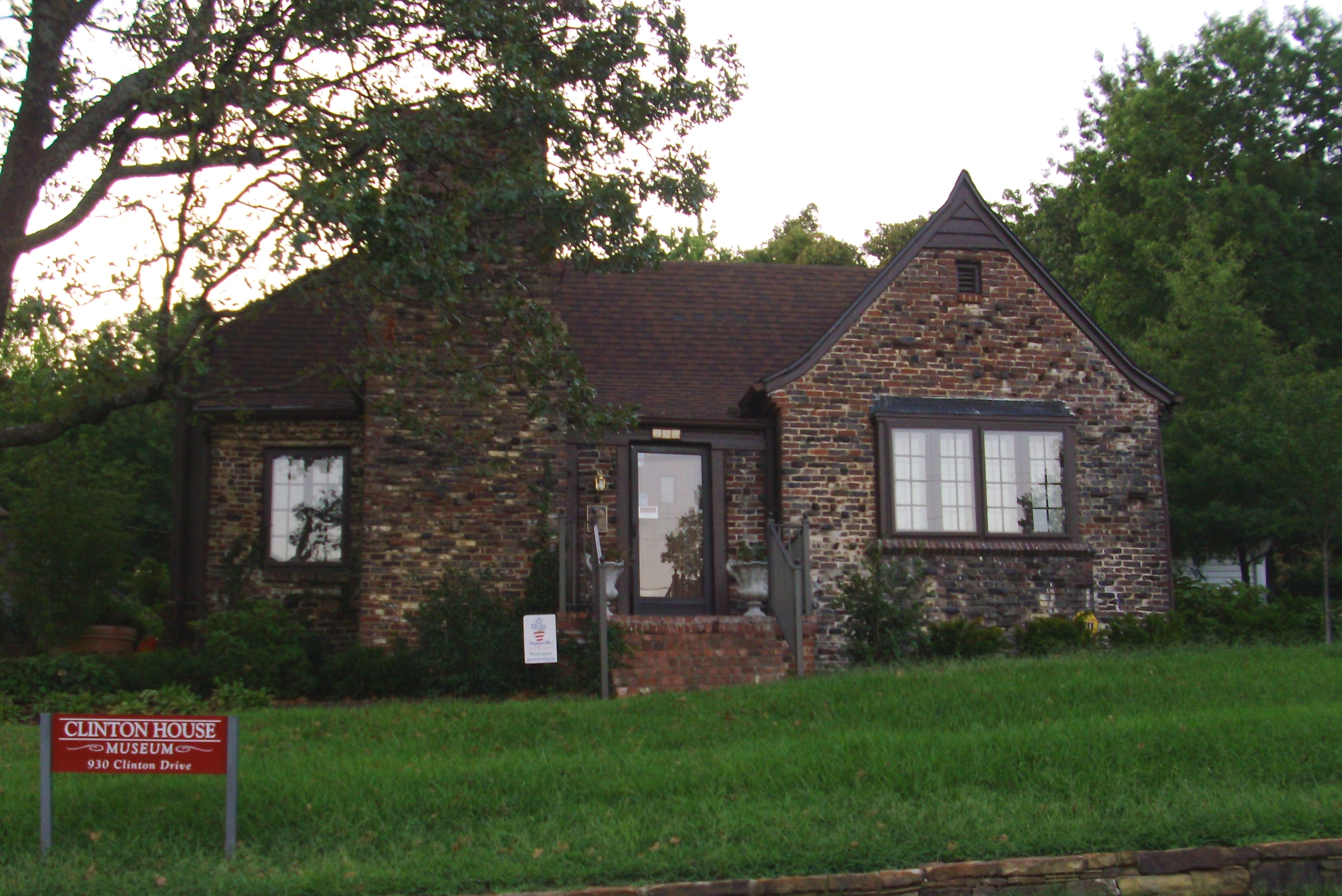
- Clinton House, August 2011

- Location within Arkansas Location within the United States
- Location: 930 W Clinton Drive, Fayetteville, Arkansas
- Coordinates: 36°3′54″N 94°10′26″W
- Area: less than one acre
- Built: 1931
- Architectural style: Tudor Revival
- NRHP reference No.: 09000800
- Added to NRHP: January 22, 2010

The Clinton House is a historic house museum at 930 West Clinton Drive in Fayetteville, Arkansas. Built in 1931, it was the first home of Bill Clinton and Hillary Rodham while they both taught at the University of Arkansas School of Law and was where they married in 1975. The house was listed on the National Register of Historic Places in 2010.

== History ==
Upon completion in 1931 in the Tudor Revival architectural style the house was inhabited by H. H. Taylor, owner of the Fayetteville Daily Leader. Later the house was bought by Gilbert C. Swanson, who was married to Roberta Fulbright, sister of J. William Fulbright. On August 11, 1975, Bill Clinton purchased the house for $17,200.00. Both Bill and Hillary were teaching at the University of Arkansas School of Law in 1975, and they were married in the living room on October 11, 1975. Bill became Arkansas Attorney General in January 1977 and they rented the home to law students until they sold the house in 1983.

== Clinton House Museum ==
The house operates as a museum and contains some pieces of Clinton election memorabilia dating to prior to his run for United States President, rooms interpreted for the 1970s, and temporary exhibits related to local history or the Clinton legacy of public service and civic engagement. There is also a replica of Hillary's wedding dress. The house is located on what was once California Boulevard; the street was renamed Clinton Drive in 2010. The museum is a stop on the "Billgrimage", which includes the Clinton Birthplace in Hope, Arkansas, and the Bill Clinton Presidential Library, among other sites.

== See also ==
- List of residences of presidents of the United States
- National Register of Historic Places listings in Washington County, Arkansas
