= Woodbury Point =

Coordinates: 42.5453°N 70.8609°W

Woodbury Point is a small peninsula jutting into Mackerel Cove located in Beverly, Massachusetts. The point is named after the Old Planter Woodbury family, who established their estate in the area during the 17th century. Was the Summer White House of William Howard Taft in 1909 and 1910. It is now the site of Lynch Park. The home was moved to Marblehead, Massachusetts later on, where it can be seen today.

== See also ==
- List of residences of presidents of the United States
