= General Electric Showcase House =

Historic house in Los Angeles, USA

Coordinates: 34.0625°N 118.5027°W

The General Electric Showcase House was at 1669 San Onofre Drive in the Pacific Palisades neighborhood of Los Angeles in California. It was built as a residence for the American actor Ronald Reagan and his family. Reagan served as a spokesperson for the American conglomerate General Electric, who furnished the house with the latest consumer products. The house was featured in advertisements for General Electric. Reagan and his family lived at the house until his election as President of the United States in 1980.

== Location ==
The house was located in the Pacific Palisades neighborhood of Los Angeles in California. It was 4,764 square feet (442.6 m^{2}) in area set over an open plan design with 4 bedrooms and bathrooms. The site of the house overlooks Santa Monica Bay, with views to Catalina Island on a clear day.

== Design ==
The house was designed by the architect William R. Stephenson and completed in 1956. The design of the house has been described as a ranch house in the Mid-century modern style. It was built as the residence for the American actor Ronald Reagan and his family. Reagan worked as a spokesperson for the American conglomerate General Electric (GE) and as the host of General Electric Theater. General Electric provided the furnishings for the house. The construction was funded by Reagan's income from General Electric of $150,000 (equivalent to $1,776,316 in 2025). In his 1990 autobiography, An American Life, Reagan described the house as a "dream home overlooking the Pacific Ocean that GE stuffed with every imaginable electric gadget". During the construction, Reagan drew hearts in wet cement with his and wife Nancy's initials.

The house was fitted with technological devices and consumer products designed by GE and served as a showcase for their products. The house was featured in magazine advertisements and television advertisements during General Electric Theater. The house was described in adverts as the "House of the Future", with Reagan and his family featured in the adverts. Nancy Reagan was not happy with her "home being turned into a corporate showcase", but acceded due to the stability provided by her husband's income from General Electric. The home's devices were centrally controlled from electric panels. The house had a dishwasher and garbage disposal unit, which were then rare objects in American homes. There were also two freezers and three refrigerators. The house was designed to be energy-efficient. A film projector was hidden behind a painting in the living room. Reagan would joke to dinner guests that the house had a direct link to the Hoover Dam (a hydroelectric generation facility) due to its extensive use of electrical wires and switches.

== History ==
=== Reagan residency ===
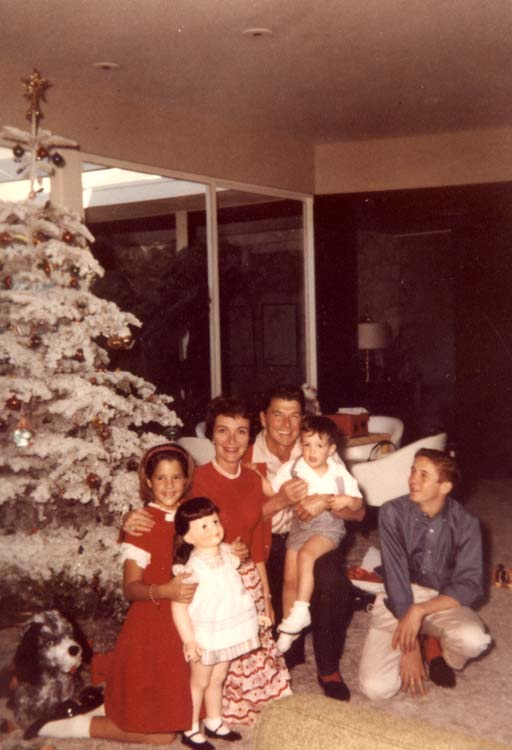
The Reagan family in the house at Christmas, 1960

Reagan, his wife Nancy, and their daughter, Patti moved to the house in 1957. (Son Ron was born in 1958). Reagan was one of the first celebrities to move to Pacific Palisades. Reagan's son Michael, whom he had adopted with his first wife, Jane Wyman, came from boarding school to visit the house on weekends. Following Reagan's "A Time for Choosing" speech of 1964, a group of wealthy Republican donors led by Holmes Tuttle visited the house to persuade him to run in the 1966 California gubernatorial election. The Reagan family infrequently visited the house following his election as Governor of California. The house was almost destroyed by a wild fire in 1977. During the fire the Reagan family threw their silverware into the swimming pool. The Reagans moved to the White House in January 1981 following his victory in the 1980 United States presidential election. Reagan was showering in the house when he was told that he had become the next President of the United States. He subsequently received the telephone call from Jimmy Carter conceding the presidential election in the living room of the house. As Nancy Reagan recalled the event:

[I had taken] a bath, and Ronnie got in the shower. In the background I could hear John Chancellor on the TV in the bedroom, and suddenly he says Ronnie's won—in a landslide. So I jumped out of the tub, started banging on the shower door, and we ran to the TV. There we were, standing in our towels, listening to them say he had been elected. Then the phone started ringing. It was President Carter, calling from Washington to concede the election and to congratulate Ronnie on winning.

After his move to the White House, Reagan sold the house in 1982.

=== Post-Reagan ===
The house sold for $5.2 million in February 2013 having been put on sale for $4.9 million in December 2012. It was subsequently redeveloped into a residence 12,000 square feet (1,100 m^{2}) in size in a Spanish Revival style with 10 bathrooms. The shower door which Reagan stepped through before he received Carter's call to concede the presidential election was preserved in the redevelopment. The house that replaced it sold for $22 million in March 2017, having been previously listed for $33 million in 2016.

== See also ==
- List of residences of presidents of the United States
