= Woodrow Wilson Boyhood Home (Columbia, South Carolina) =

Historic house in South Carolina, United States

- Woodrow Wilson Family Home
- U.S. National Register of Historic Places
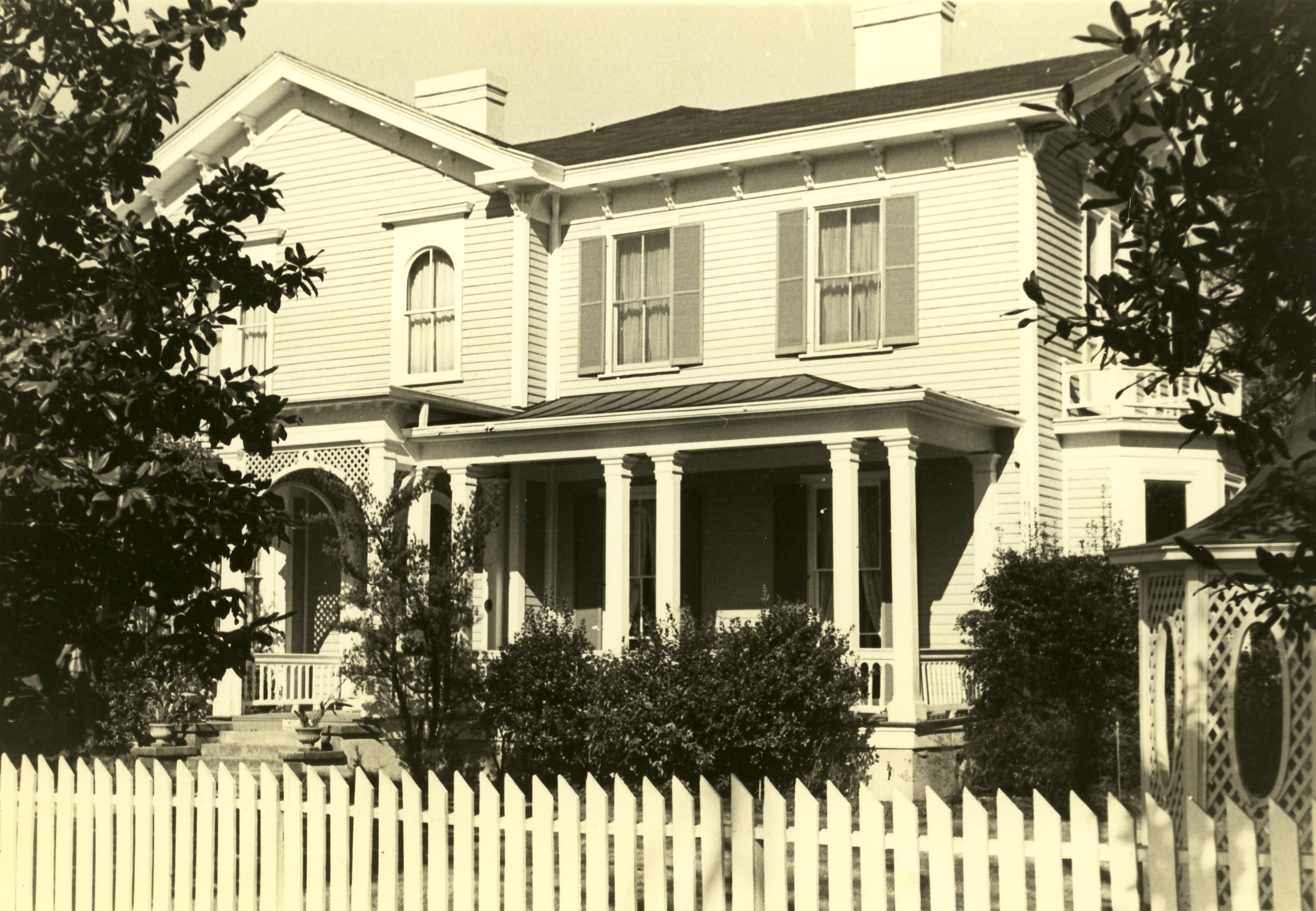
- Woodrow Wilson Family Home

- Location within South Carolina Location within the United States
- Location: 1705 Hampton St., Columbia, South Carolina
- Coordinates: 34°0′29″N 81°1′38″W
- Area: less than one acre
- Built: 1871
- Architectural style: Italian Villa
- NRHP reference No.: 72001222
- Added to NRHP: February 23, 1972

The Woodrow Wilson Family Home is located in Columbia, South Carolina and was one of the childhood homes of the 28th President Woodrow Wilson. He lived in the house from 1871 to 1875.

In 1967, Historic Columbia purchased the house. Renovation occurred in 2013 and the house was re-opened to the public in 2014. At that time the house museum was re-dedicated to focusing on the Reconstruction Era. In order to better represent the change, Historic Columbia changed the name of the site to the Museum of the Reconstruction Era at the Woodrow Wilson Home in 2020.

== History ==
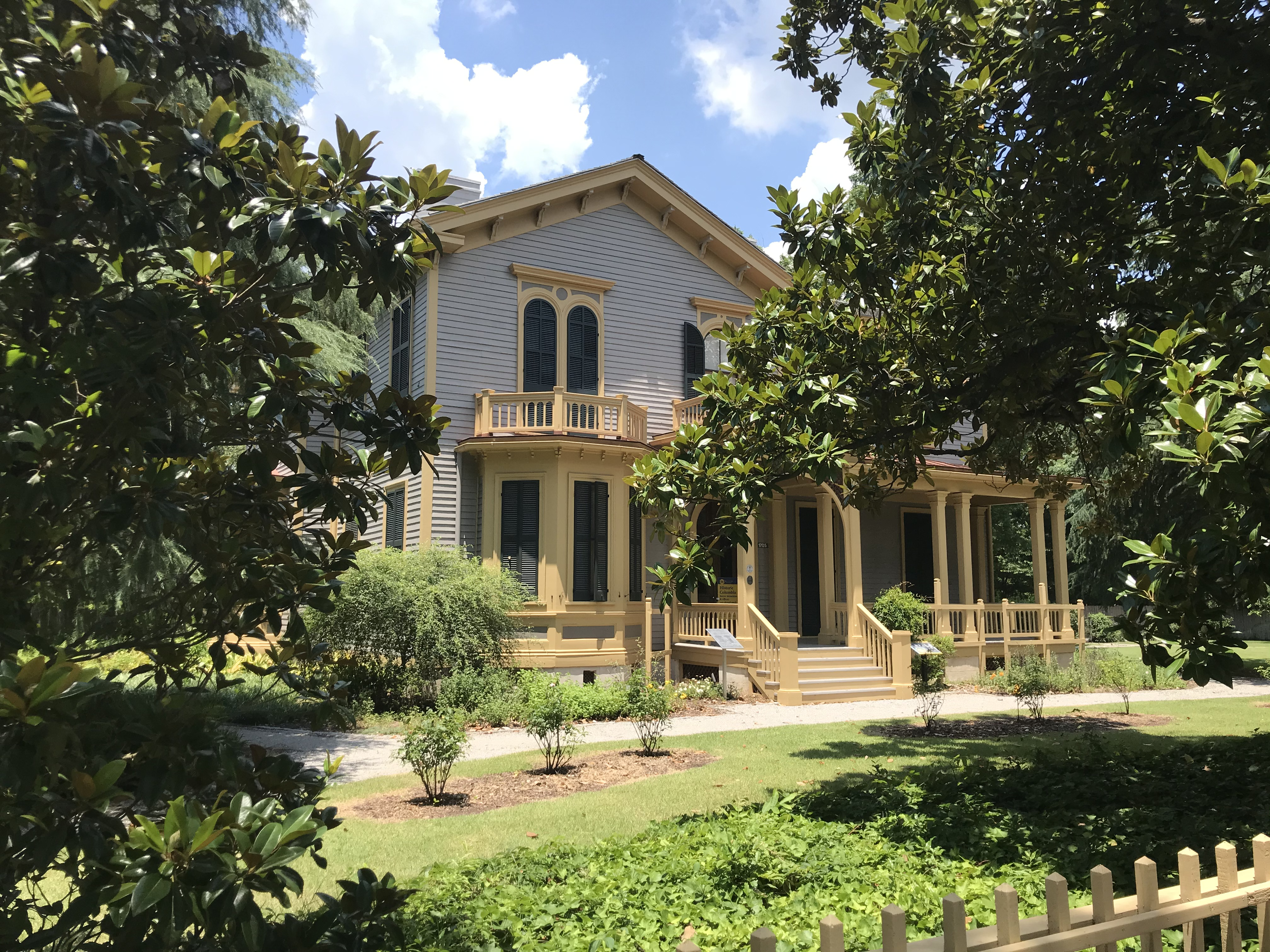
Woodrow Wilson's boy home in Columbia, SC

The house, completed by late 1871, was the only one that Woodrow Wilson's parents would ever own. They lived there for four years, before Wilson's father resigned his position as pastor.

A grassroots movement in 1928 preserved the home and prevented its scheduled demolition. It opened to the public as a museum in 1932. The house is furnished with period pieces from the 1850s–1870s, although only a few were owned by the Wilson family. They include, although he was not born in the house, the bed on which Wilson was born. Stewardship of the site shifted to Historic Columbia in 1967. The revised interpretation of the site debuted in February 2014.

== Modern times ==
=== As the Woodrow Wilson Family Home ===
In October 2005, the home closed to tours in preparation for a complete renovation of the structure and landscaping. In April 2009 the first of three phases of renovation began, starting with structural repairs. Phase two, which included a new building on the property, electrical upgrades and minor carpentry work, was completed in late 2012. The new building, located in an area where previous support buildings stood in the past, includes bathrooms, a catering kitchen and mechanical and electrical rooms to offer the ability to host events at the home. The renovation was completed in 2013, with re-opening to the public planned for 2014.

Today, the house interprets the Reconstruction period—as experienced by the Wilsons and other citizens of Columbia and Richland County—as South Carolina and the rest of the nation shifted socially, politically and economically to adjust to new freedoms for previously enslaved men and women following the Civil War. Their experiences are the basis for modern interpretation of citizenship in the United States.

=== Name change ===
In 2020, Historic Columbia renamed the site the Museum of the Reconstruction Era at the Woodrow Wilson Home. A member of Historic Columbia stated the name change better represented the experience visitors have at the house. The museum is one of the only museums in the country dedicated to the reconstruction era.

== See also ==
- Woodrow Wilson Birthplace and Presidential Library, Staunton, Virginia
- Woodrow Wilson House (Washington, D.C.)
- List of residences of presidents of the United States
