= Tisbury Great Pond =

Salt pond

- Location within Massachusetts
- Ocean/sea sources: Atlantic Ocean
- Catchment area: 11,005 acres (44.54 km^{2})
- Surface area: 662 acres (2.68 km^{2}; 1.034 sq mi) to 800 acres (3.2 km^{2}; 1.3 sq mi) (varies)
- Average depth: 5.4 feet (1.6 m) to 8.2 feet (2.5 m) (varies), with 0.6 feet (0.18 m) tidal range.
- Frozen: Never
- Islands: None permanent

Tisbury Great Pond is a salt pond in the town of West Tisbury, Massachusetts and oyster restoration site. It is the largest 'great pond' on Martha's Vineyard.
