= Key Biscayne, Florida =

Village in Miami-Dade County, Florida

- Village
- Village of Key Biscayne
- Seal
- Motto: Island Paradise
- Location in Miami-Dade County and the state of Florida

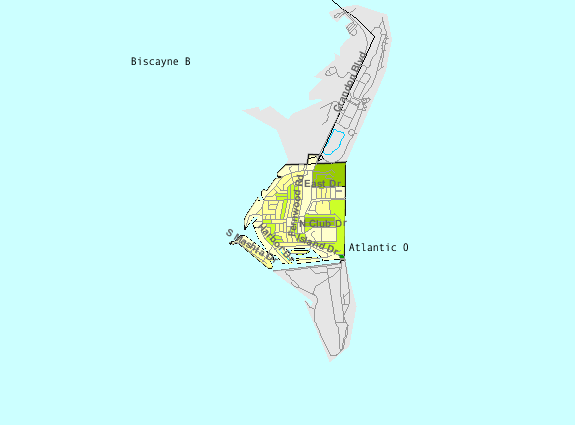
- U.S. Census Bureau map showing village boundaries
- Coordinates: 25°41′27″N 80°09′56″W
- Country: United States
- State: Florida
- County: Miami-Dade
- Incorporated: June 18, 1991

Government
  - Type: Council-Manager

Area
  - Total: 1.71 sq mi (4.42 km^{2})
  - Land: 1.25 sq mi (3.23 km^{2})
  - Water: 0.46 sq mi (1.19 km^{2}) 8.63%
- Elevation: 3 ft (0.91 m)

Population (2020)
  - Total: 14,809
  - Density: 11,873/sq mi (4,584.3/km^{2})
- Time zone: UTC−5 (Eastern (EST))
  - Summer (DST): UTC−4 (EDT)
- ZIP Code: 33149
- Area codes: 305, 786, 645
- FIPS code: 12-36300
- GNIS feature ID: 2407484
- Website: www.keybiscayne.fl.gov

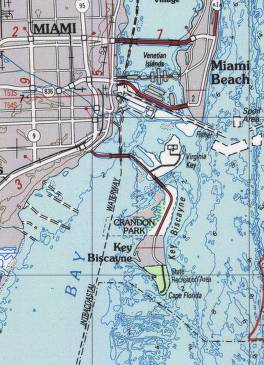
Map of Key Biscayne

Key Biscayne is a village in Miami-Dade County, Florida, United States. Located on the island of Key Biscayne, the village is part of the Miami metropolitan area of South Florida. The population was 14,809 at the 2020 census, up from 12,344 in 2010.

== History ==
=== Rickenbacker Causeway ===
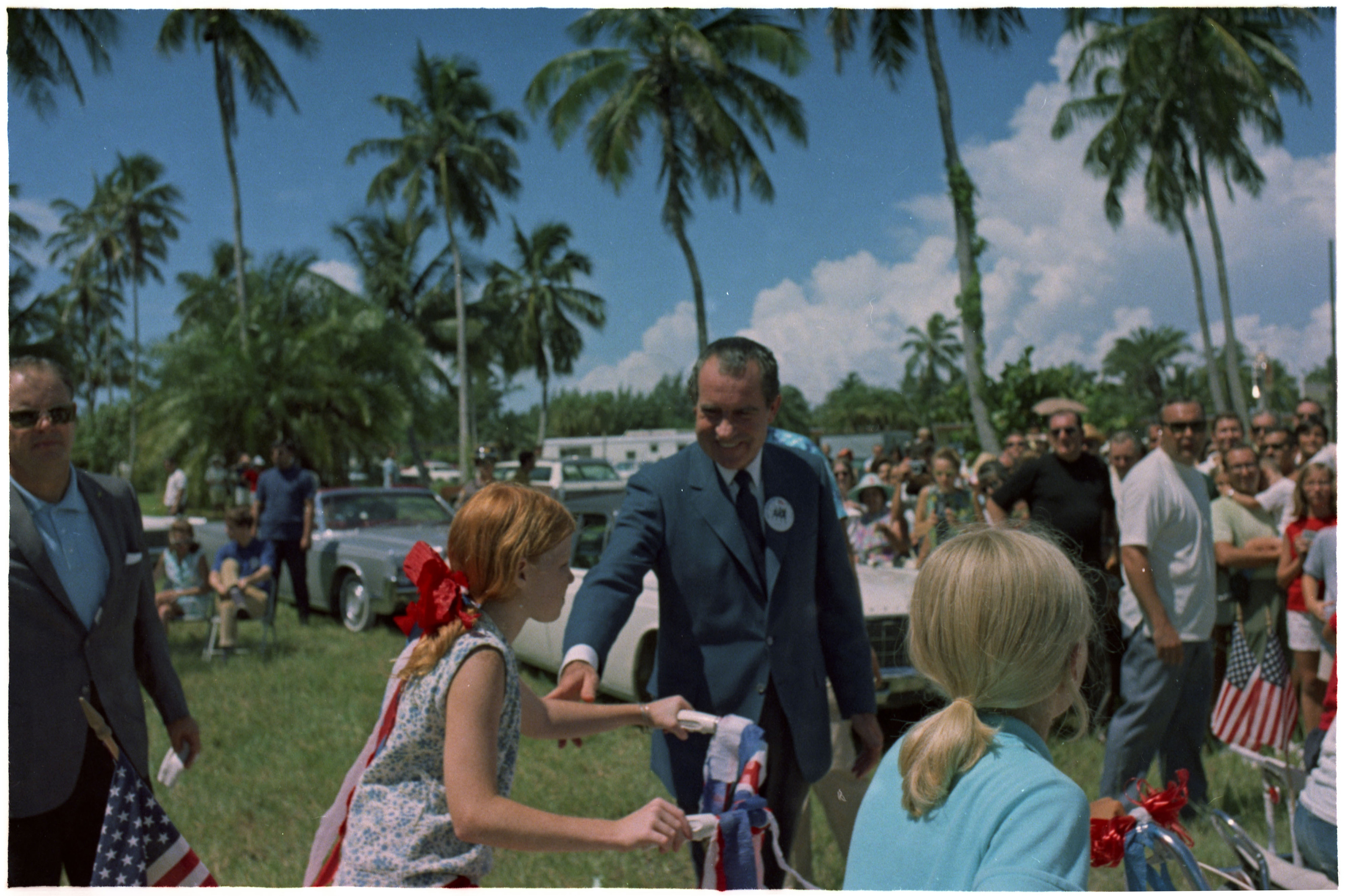
U.S. President Richard Nixon at Key Biscayne's Fourth of July parade in 1969; as president, Nixon visited his Key Biscayne compound over 50 times.

While there had been earlier plans to develop a town on Key Biscayne, the opening of the 4-mile-long (6.4 km) Rickenbacker Causeway from Miami to Virginia Key and on to Key Biscayne in 1947 opened the island up to large-scale residential development. The northern two-thirds of the island had operated as the largest coconut plantation in the continental United States during the first half of the 20th century.

In 1940, the Matheson family donated over 800 acres (3.2 km^{2}) of their land to Dade County for a public park, which became Crandon Park, in exchange for a commitment from the county that it would build a causeway to the island. The remaining Matheson property, stretching across the middle of the island, was sold to developers. Beginning in 1951, the Mackle Construction Company offered new homes on the island for $9,540, with $500 down. A U.S. Post Office branch opened in Key Biscayne, the Community Church started holding services in an old coconut-husking shed, and Key Biscayne Elementary School opened in 1952.

The island's southern third, which included Cape Florida, was owned by James Deering, and, after his death, by his brother Charles, for 35 years. In 1948, José Manuel Áleman, a Cuban politician in exile, bought the Cape Florida property from the Deering estate. After Áleman died in 1951, his widow, Elena Santeiro Garcia, added to the property, purchasing an ocean-to-bay strip that had been part of the Matheson property. This strip included a canal William Matheson dug in the 1920s that extended from the bay across most of the island. The land north of the canal was developed as part of what is now the Village of Key Biscayne. In 1966, Garcia sold the Cape Florida property to the state of Florida, and the property became Bill Baggs Cape Florida State Park, which opened January 1, 1967.

=== Richard Nixon compound ===
In 1969, U.S. President Richard Nixon purchased the first of his three waterfront homes, forming a compound known as the Florida White House, to be near his close friend and confidant Bebe Rebozo, owner of Key Biscayne Bank, and industrialist Robert Abplanalp, inventor of the modern spray can valve. Rebozo was indicted for laundering a $100,000 donation from Howard Hughes to Nixon's election campaign. Presidents Kennedy and Nixon met for the first time after Nixon's 1960 presidential campaign defeat in an oceanfront villa at the old Key Biscayne Hotel.

Plans for the break-in at the Democratic National Committee headquarters in the Watergate complex were discussed at Nixon's Key Biscayne compound and, as the Watergate scandal unfolded, Nixon retreated into seclusion there with greater regularity. Between 1969 and 1973, he visited Key Biscayne over 50 times. The U.S. Department of Defense spent $400,000 constructing a helicopter landing pad in Biscayne Bay adjacent to his compound; when Nixon later sold the property, including the helicopter pad, there were public accusations that he had enriched himself at taxpayer expense.

=== Incorporation ===
The area was incorporated as a new municipality in 1991, making it the first new city in Miami-Dade County in over 50 years. Rafael Conte was elected the first mayor, along with the members of the founding village council: Clifford Brody, Mortimer Fried, Michael Hill, Bautista Tedin, Lucas Keller, Luis Lauredo, Joe Rasco, and Raymond Sullivan. The municipality's first manager was C. Samuel Kissinger and the first clerk was Guido Inguanzo. The village's incorporation, overseen by Alfred Brewer, provided local control over taxes and future development.

Key Biscayne is a small, intimate community. Most families that live there have known each other for generations. Children who grew up on the island are sometimes referred to as "Key Rats".

=== Hurricane Andrew ===
In 1992, Hurricane Andrew flooded some homes and businesses on Key Biscayne, impacting insurance. The eye wall passed over uninhabited Bill Baggs Cape Florida State Park, which received the brunt of the storm. The damage was a blessing for the park because it destroyed all the non-native vegetation the state had been trying to eradicate. Federal and state funding allowed the replanting with native vegetation, making the park a showplace natural area. The town is in Evacuation Zone A.

In 2017, a study found that the town could be partly flooded at high tides by 2045 after sea-level rise. Property values fell.

In November 2020, the town voted to approve a $100 million bond to protect itself.

The village has its own fire, police and public elementary and middle school. The millage tax rate remains one of the lowest of any municipality in Miami-Dade County. In 2004, the village completed the construction of a civic center, including fire, police and administration buildings and a recreation and community center with indoor multi-use courts, an outdoor swimming pool, and a musical theater program.

== Geography ==
Key Biscayne lies south of Miami Beach and east of Miami. The village is connected to Miami via the Rickenbacker Causeway, originally built in 1947. Because of its low elevation and direct exposure to the Atlantic Ocean, it is usually among the first Miami areas to be evacuated before an oncoming hurricane.

According to the U.S. Census Bureau, the town has an area of 1.7 square miles (4.4 km^{2}), of which 1.2 square miles (3.1 km^{2}) is land and 0.5 square miles (1 km^{2}) (27.0%) is water. The village is bordered on the north by Crandon Park, a Miami-Dade County park; on the south by Bill Baggs Cape Florida State Park; on the east by the Atlantic Ocean; and on the west by Biscayne Bay.

=== Climate ===
Key Biscayne has a tropical monsoon climate (Am). Key Biscayne experiences hot, humid summers and warm, dry winters. The island is in USDA plant zone 11a. Due to its island location, Key Biscayne is subject to cooler highs than Miami year-round. Hurricanes threaten the island occasionally, though landfalls are rare. Precipitation is lower than that of Miami, as the Atlantic Ocean inhibits summer thunderstorm convection.

Climate data for Cape Florida (1991–2020 normals, extremes 1999–present)
Month	Jan	Feb	Mar	Apr	May	Jun	Jul	Aug	Sep	Oct	Nov	Dec	Year
Record high °F (°C)	87 (31)	87 (31)	90 (32)	96 (36)	93 (34)	96 (36)	96 (36)	96 (36)	95 (35)	93 (34)	90 (32)	88 (31)	96 (36)
Mean maximum °F (°C)	83.3 (28.5)	83.3 (28.5)	85.9 (29.9)	88.7 (31.5)	88.9 (31.6)	92.0 (33.3)	92.6 (33.7)	92.4 (33.6)	92.1 (33.4)	90.5 (32.5)	86.5 (30.3)	84.3 (29.1)	93.9 (34.4)
Mean daily maximum °F (°C)	77.5 (25.3)	78.9 (26.1)	80.9 (27.2)	83.8 (28.8)	86.5 (30.3)	89.6 (32.0)	90.8 (32.7)	91.4 (33.0)	90.3 (32.4)	87.2 (30.7)	82.7 (28.2)	79.7 (26.5)	84.9 (29.4)
Daily mean °F (°C)	70.1 (21.2)	71.8 (22.1)	74.0 (23.3)	77.6 (25.3)	80.7 (27.1)	83.8 (28.8)	84.9 (29.4)	85.4 (29.7)	84.5 (29.2)	81.6 (27.6)	76.7 (24.8)	72.9 (22.7)	78.7 (25.9)
Mean daily minimum °F (°C)	62.8 (17.1)	64.8 (18.2)	67.1 (19.5)	71.5 (21.9)	74.9 (23.8)	78.0 (25.6)	79.0 (26.1)	79.4 (26.3)	78.7 (25.9)	76.1 (24.5)	70.7 (21.5)	66.0 (18.9)	72.4 (22.4)
Mean minimum °F (°C)	44.5 (6.9)	48.1 (8.9)	52.6 (11.4)	60.2 (15.7)	67.0 (19.4)	71.9 (22.2)	73.9 (23.3)	74.4 (23.6)	74.0 (23.3)	65.2 (18.4)	56.3 (13.5)	50.7 (10.4)	41.7 (5.4)
Record low °F (°C)	35 (2)	38 (3)	44 (7)	49 (9)	61 (16)	64 (18)	71 (22)	71 (22)	66 (19)	54 (12)	45 (7)	37 (3)	35 (2)
Average precipitation inches (mm)	2.44 (62)	2.00 (51)	2.37 (60)	3.17 (81)	5.67 (144)	7.37 (187)	5.64 (143)	7.05 (179)	7.54 (192)	6.33 (161)	3.51 (89)	2.24 (57)	55.33 (1,406)
Average precipitation days (≥ 0.01 in)	7.9	6.5	6.3	6.1	9.9	14.8	14.9	15.8	15.3	12.8	9.0	8.0	127.3
Source: NOAA (mean maxima/minima 2006–2020)

== Demographics ==
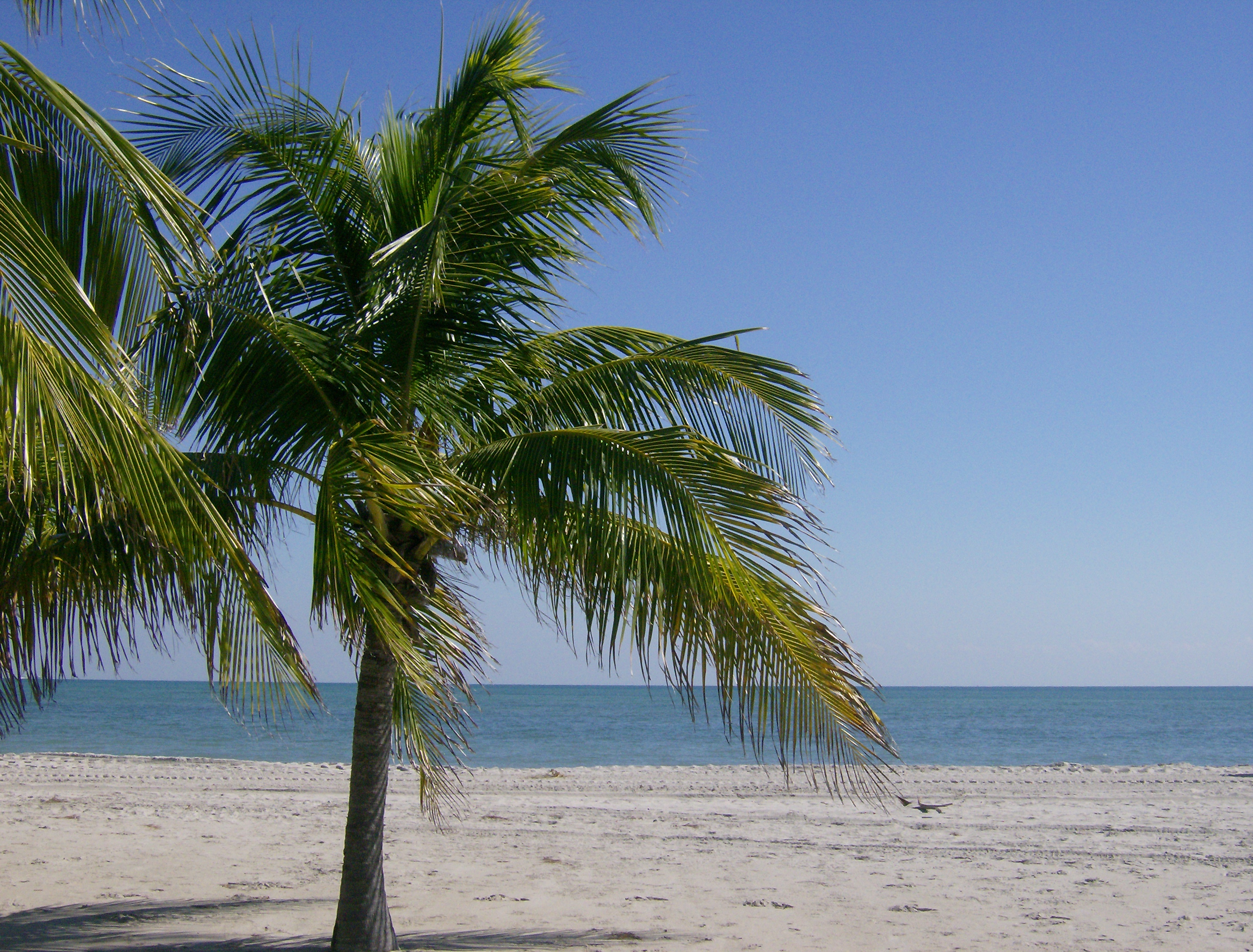
The beach at Crandon Park in Key Biscayne in February 2008

Historical population
Census	Pop.	Note	%±
2000	10,507		—
2010	12,344		17.5%
2020	14,809		20.0%
U.S. Decennial Census

=== Racial and ethnic composition ===
Key Biscayne village, Florida – Racial composition Note: the US Census treats Hispanic/Latino as an ethnic category. This table excludes Latinos from the racial categories and assigns them to a separate category. Hispanics/Latinos may be of any race.
Race (NH = Non-Hispanic)	% 2020	% 2010	% 2000	Pop 2020	Pop 2010	Pop 2000
White alone (NH)	26.9%	36.5%	48.1%	3,979	4,503	5,058
Black alone (NH)	0.2%	0.3%	0.3%	27	33	28
American Indian alone (NH)	0%	0%	0.1%	3	4	7
Asian alone (NH)	0.7%	1%	0.9%	106	127	93
Pacific Islander alone (NH)	0%	0%	0%	0	0	0
Other race alone (NH)	0.6%	0.2%	0.2%	87	19	22
Multiracial (NH)	4.9%	0.5%	0.6%	719	56	68
Hispanic/Latino (any race)	66.8%	61.6%	49.8%	9,888	7,602	5,231

=== 2020 census ===
As of the 2020 census, Key Biscayne had a population of 14,809. The median age was 43.4 years. 27.9% of residents were under the age of 18 and 17.7% of residents were 65 years of age or older. For every 100 females, there were 89.8 males, and for every 100 females age 18 and over, there were 84.8 males age 18 and over.

100.0% of residents lived in urban areas, while 0.0% lived in rural areas.

There were 5,296 households in Key Biscayne, of which 41.7% had children under the age of 18 living in them. Of all households, 60.2% were married-couple households, 12.4% were households with a male householder and no spouse or partner present, and 24.7% were households with a female householder and no spouse or partner present. About 22.2% of all households were made up of individuals and 11.8% had someone living alone who was 65 years of age or older.

There were 7,215 housing units, of which 26.6% were vacant. The homeowner vacancy rate was 2.1% and the rental vacancy rate was 10.3%.

The most reported ancestries in 2020 were:

- Cuban (10.3%)
- Italian (9.7%)
- Colombian (8.9%)
- Spanish (8.6%)
- Venezuelan (8.5%)
- Argentinean (8.3%)
- German (5.9%)
- English (5.3%)
- Mexican (4.4%)
- Brazilian (4.4%)

According to 2020 ACS estimates, there were 3,174 families residing in the village.

=== 2010 census ===
Key Biscayne Demographics
2010 census	Key Biscayne	Miami-Dade County	Florida
Total population	12,344	2,496,435	18,801,310
Population, percent change, 2000 to 2010	+17.5%	+10.8%	+17.6%
Population density	10,070.7/sq mi	1,315.5/sq mi	350.6/sq mi
White or Caucasian (including White Hispanic)	96.2%	73.8%	75.0%
(Non-Hispanic White or Caucasian)	36.5%	15.4%	57.9%
Black or African-American	0.4%	18.9%	16.0%
Hispanic or Latino (of any race)	61.6%	65.0%	22.5%
Asian	1.1%	1.5%	2.4%
Native American or Native Alaskan	0.1%	0.2%	0.4%
Pacific Islander or Native Hawaiian	0.0%	0.0%	0.1%
Two or more races (Multiracial)	1.2%	2.4%	2.5%
Some Other Race	1.0%	3.2%	3.6%

As of the 2010 U.S. census, there were 12,344 people, 4,256 households, and 2,976 families residing in the village.

=== 2000 census ===
In 2000, 32.3% had children under the age of 18 living with them, 58.0% were married couples living together, 7.7% had a female householder with no husband present, and 31.9% were non-families. 27.9% of all households were made up of individuals, and 9.5% had someone living alone who was 65 years of age or older. The average household size was 2.47 and the average family size was 2.99.

In 2000, 24.2% under the age of 18, 4.6% from 18 to 24, 29.6% from 25 to 44, 26.0% from 45 to 64, and 15.6% who were 65 years of age or older. The median age was 40 years. For every 100 females, there were 88.4 males. For every 100 females age 18 and over, there were 84.8 males.

In 2000, the median income for a household in the village was $86,599, and the median income for a family was $107,610. Males had a median income of $86,322 versus $46,765 for females. The per capita income for the village was $54,213.

As of 2000, 59.73% of residents spoke Spanish at home, while 30.84% spoke only English. Speakers of Portuguese were 2.83%, French 2.67%, Italian 1.67%, and German 1.47% of the population.

== Media ==
The Islander News is a weekly community newspaper serving Key Biscayne. The estimated circulation in 2020 was 3,600.

Key Biscayne Magazine is a lifestyle magazine published in Miami by TAG Media, publishers of Brickell Magazine. The circulation of the magazine was about 10,000 in 2020.

== Education ==
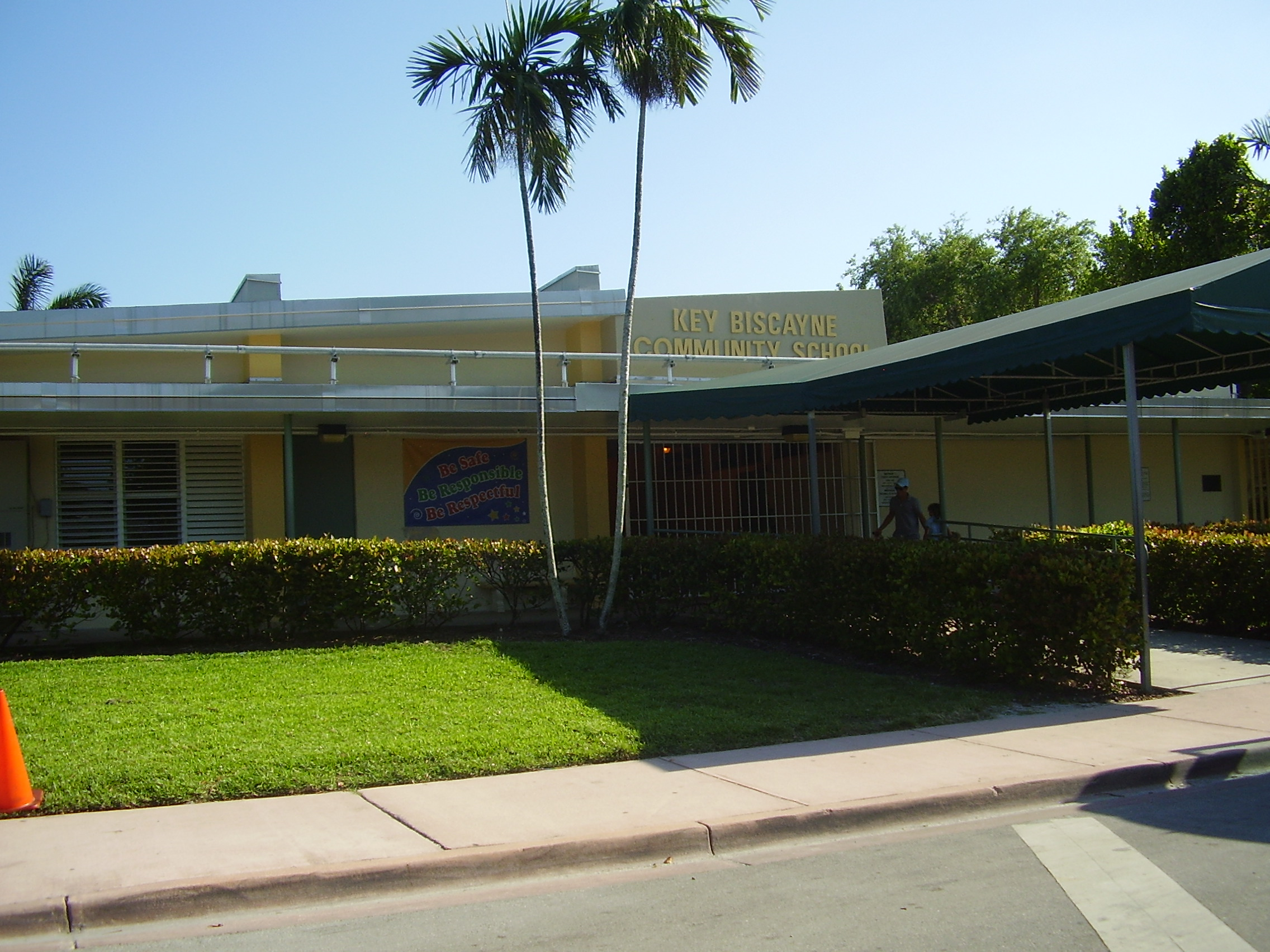
Key Biscayne Community School

Miami-Dade County Public Schools serves Key Biscayne. The Key Biscayne K–8 Center serves Key Biscayne. Middle school students may attend Ponce de Leon Middle School in Coral Gables instead of the Key Biscayne School. High school students are zoned to Coral Gables Senior High School.

MAST Academy, a magnet school on Virginia Key, has since 2012 given eligible Key Biscayne residents priority in filling 1,100 seats in the school's Cambridge program.

The Miami-Dade Public Library System operates the 6,000-square-foot (560 m^{2}) Key Biscayne Branch Library. It opened in January 1985.

St. Agnes Academy is a Catholic private school at 122 Harbor Drive, of the Roman Catholic Archdiocese of Miami. It serves pre-K–8th grade.

== Notable people ==
- Jaime Bayly, writer
- Jay Berger, former tennis player
- Raul Boesel, race car driver
- Cher, actress and singer
- Soman Chainani, writer
- Gaetano Ciancio, transplant surgeon
- Benjamin Cremaschi, Argentine-American soccer player
- Isabel Pérez Farfante, carcinologist
- Mary Joe Fernández, former professional tennis player
- Timothy Ferris, author
- Emerson Fittipaldi, race car driver
- Fonseca, Colombian singer
- Andy García, actor
- Arthur Hanlon, pianist
- Juanes, Colombian singer
- Luis J. Lauredo, former U.S. Ambassador to the Organization of American States
- Martin Margulies, billionaire art collector and fixture of Miami's high society
- Juan Pablo Montoya, Colombian race car driver
- Richard Nixon, U.S. president; see Nixon's Florida White House
- Brad Pitt, actor
- Bebe Rebozo, banker and confidante of Richard Nixon
- Eddie Rickenbacker, fighter pilot for whom Rickenbacker Causeway is named

== Hotels and condominiums controversy ==
As noted above, the construction of several condominium complexes in Key Biscayne caused the population to soar. In 2007, voters approved an amendment to the village charter requiring that future land use changes be approved by voters. In 2008, the village council, saying that requiring community voting on zoning changes infringed on its responsibility, submitted another proposal to revise the charter. But on November 4, 2008, voters overwhelmingly rejected the council's proposed change, defeating the amendment by a more than two-to-one margin.

== Other information ==
Key Biscayne hosts the Tennis Center at Crandon Park, former home to the Miami Open Tennis Tournament, and a golf course, along with many amenities for water sports and fishing.

Key Biscayne has a visitors center, open 24/7, 365 days a year, in the Village Hall, 88 West McIntyre Street #100, next to the police station. Staffed M–F from 9am to 5pm

== Gallery ==
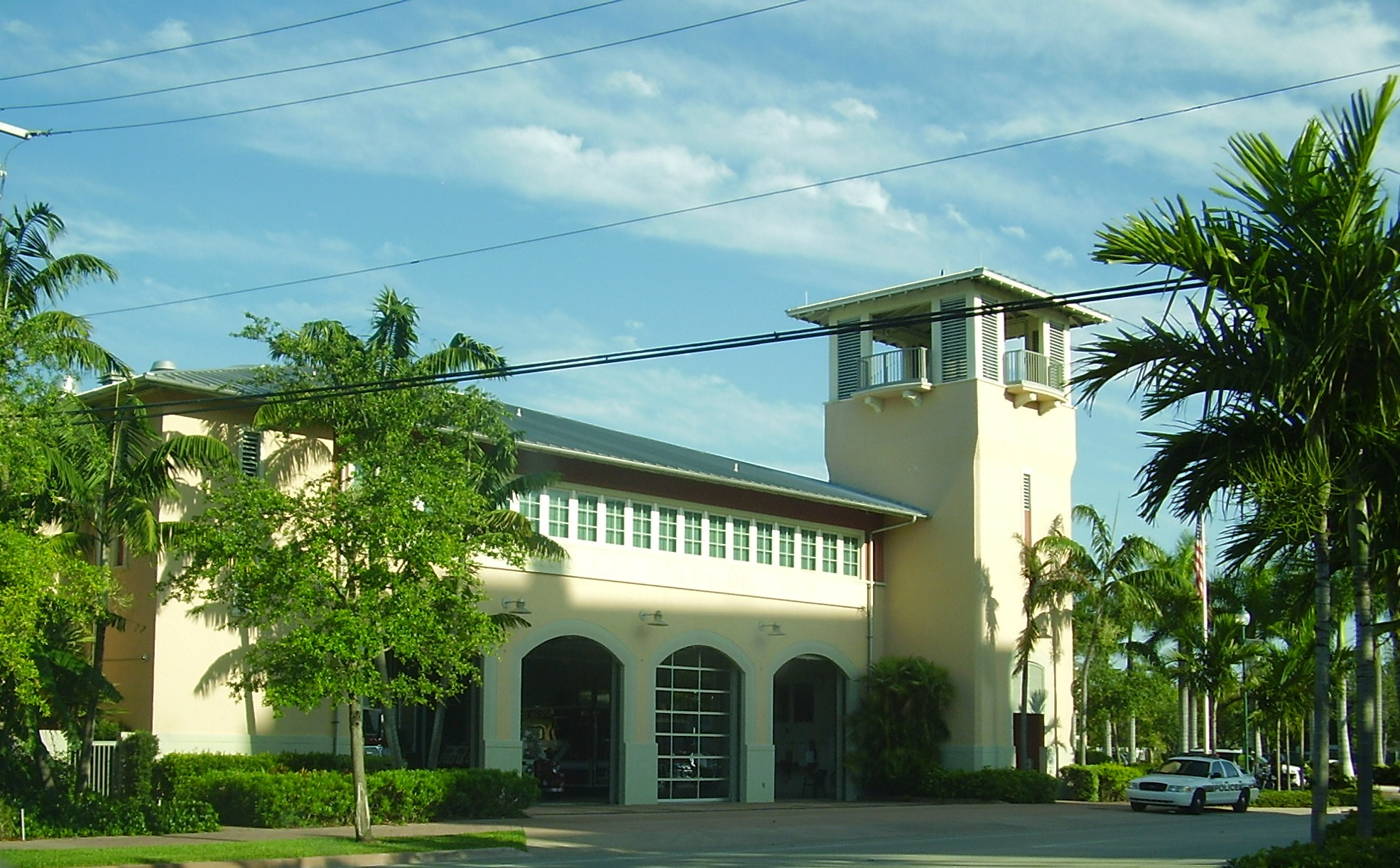
Fire station
