= Bebe Rebozo =

American businessman (1912–1998)

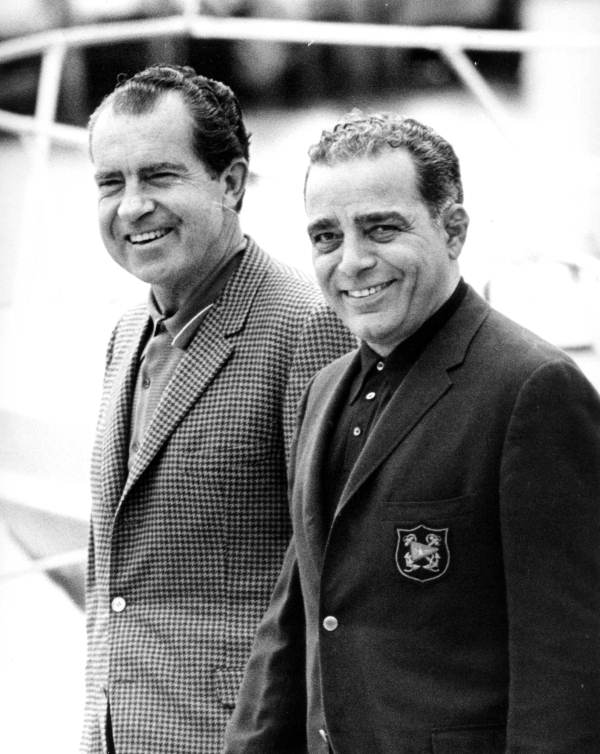
Rebozo (right) with Richard Nixon

Charles Gregory "Bebe" (pronounced BEE-bee) Rebozo (November 17, 1912 – May 8, 1998) was an American Florida-based banker and businessman who was a close friend and confidant of President Richard Nixon.

== Early life ==
The youngest of 12 children (hence, the nickname "Bebe" meaning "Baby" in Spanish) of Cuban immigrants, Matias and Carmen, Rebozo owned several businesses in Florida, including a gas station and a group of laundromats, before he started his own bank, the Key Biscayne Bank & Trust, in Key Biscayne, Florida, in 1964. Rebozo regularly attended Key Biscayne Community Church, sometimes accompanied during later years by Nixon.

== Friendship with Richard Nixon ==
Rebozo first met then-U.S. Representative Nixon in 1950 through Florida Representative George Smathers. Smathers had recommended Key Biscayne as a vacation destination to Nixon, who eventually established a residence there which was later nicknamed the "Winter White House" by journalists. While Nixon was vacationing in Key Biscayne, Smathers had Rebozo take Nixon deep sea fishing. Rebozo and Nixon then started a friendship that endured 44 years.

Rebozo quickly became best friend and financial and real estate advisor to Nixon. In 1968 Rebozo changed his party from Democratic to Republican.

According to Rebozo, the two men were swimming together at Rebozo's home in June 1972 when Nixon was first informed of the Watergate Hotel break-in, and he was with the president on the night that Nixon resolved to resign from the presidency. John Dean, Nixon's lawyer, testified before the House Judiciary Committee that he had been ordered to direct government agencies covertly to punish a journalist who called Rebozo "Nixon's bagman." Rebozo was investigated for accepting covert payments of $100,000 on behalf of Nixon.

Journalist Jack Anderson speculated that Watergate Special Prosecutor Archibald Cox had been fired because he had started to investigate Rebozo's role in Nixon's accepting covert payments.

According to a November 27, 1975, article in The New York Times, a completed manuscript of a biography on Rebozo, which was scheduled to be published by Farrar, Straus and Giroux, was stolen from the home of Thomas Kiernan. In addition to Rebozo's biography, "several tape recordings of interviews and several research files, including one file containing all of Mr. Kiernan's book contracts and another containing all his royalty statements, were taken," the newspaper reported. Other news coverage at the time pointed out that the "thieves [had] ignored" jewelry and other items of value.

In 1974, Rebozo received a letter threatening his life.

In 1976, Rebozo was the subject of a bank fraud investigation. The loan application Rebozo filed with Hudson Valley National Bank in Yonkers, New York, stated that the loan was for residential real estate when it was actually used for business. Rebozo repaid the loan with interest and the bank did not file a complaint.

Mobster Vincent Teresa admitted to laundering stolen money at Rebozo's bank.

=== Role in firing of NPS director George Hartzog ===
Rebozo encouraged Richard Nixon to fire then-National Park Service director George Hartzog in retaliation for receiving "a ticket from a park ranger in Biscayne National Park for tying his boat illegally to an NPS administrative dock there." Nixon fired Hartzog in December 1972, despite attempts by Secretary of the Interior Rogers Morton to talk the president out of his decision.

Nixon opted to replace Hartzog with his office's head of travel arrangement Ron Walker, an "unqualified appointment" who openly admitted "that he did not know the difference between the National Park Service and the Boy Scouts." Rebozo's influence on Nixon's firing of Hartzog has also been noted in Dr. Gil Lusk's 2019 book National Parks: Our Living National Treasures and A Conservative Environmentalist: The Life and Career of Frank Masland Jr. Former National Park Service director Jonathan B. Jarvis has credited Rebozo with indirectly bringing about an overly-politicized era of the Parks program administration that still exists to the present, wherein NPS directors are expected to resign with the election of each new president.

== Personal life ==
Following his graduation from Miami High School, class of 1930, Rebozo married his high school sweetheart, Claire Gunn. Both of them were 18, and the marriage was annulled three years later. In 1946, they remarried but divorced four years later. He later married Jane Lucke, who survived him.

== Death ==
Rebozo died on May 8, 1998, of complications from a brain aneurysm.

== Sources ==
- Fulsom, Don (February 5, 2006). "The Mob's President: Richard Nixon's Secret Ties to the Mafia." Crime Magazine.
- Leinster, Colin (July 31, 1970). "Nixon’s Friend Bebe." Life, vol. 69, no. 5. pp. 18-26.
- Summers, Anthony (2000). The Arrogance of Power: The Secret World of Richard Nixon.
