= Mary DuBois =

Mary DuBois may refer to:

- Mary Ann Delafield DuBois (1813–1888), American sculptor and philanthropist
- Mary Rakowski DuBois (born 1946), American inorganic chemist
- Mary Silvina Burghardt Du Bois (1831–1885), American domestic worker
