= Mary Rakowski DuBois =

American inorganic chemist

- Born: Mary Clare Rakowski; 1946 (age 79–80)
- Education: Creighton University B.S. (1970); Ohio State University Ph.D. (1974)
- Spouse: Daniel L. DuBois
- Scientific career
- Workplaces: Pacific Northwest National Laboratory (2007-2011) University of Colorado at Boulder (1976-2007) Cornell University (1974-1976)
- Thesis: Complexes with macrocyclic ligands: I. The oxydation reduction behavior of iron complexes. II. Synthesis and characterization of transition metal containing a pentadentate ligand (1974)
- Doctoral advisor: Daryle H. Busch
- Other academic advisors: Earl Muetterties

Mary Rakowski DuBois is an inorganic chemist, now retired from Pacific Northwest National Laboratory (PNNL). She made multiple contributions to inorganic and organometallic chemistry, focusing on synthetic and mechanistic studies. In recognition of her scientific contributions, she received several awards.

== Education and career ==
Rakowski DuBois conducted her undergraduate training at Creighton University, receiving her B.S. in 1970. She earned her Ph.D. in 1974 under the mentorship of Daryle H. Busch at Ohio State University, and then was a postdoctoral fellow with Earl Muetterties at Cornell University.

She joined the faculty of the University of Colorado at Boulder in 1976, and was a professor there until 2007, where she moved to Pacific Northwest National Laboratory (PNNL). She retired from PNNL in 2011.

== Research ==
Together with her husband Daniel L. DuBois, Rakowski DuBois led a team that elucidated the reactivity of nickel complexes of P2N2 ligands, which were popularized at PNNL. The behavior of these complexes highlighted the strong influence of the second coordination sphere on the rates of activation of H_{2} by 16-electron nickel complexes.

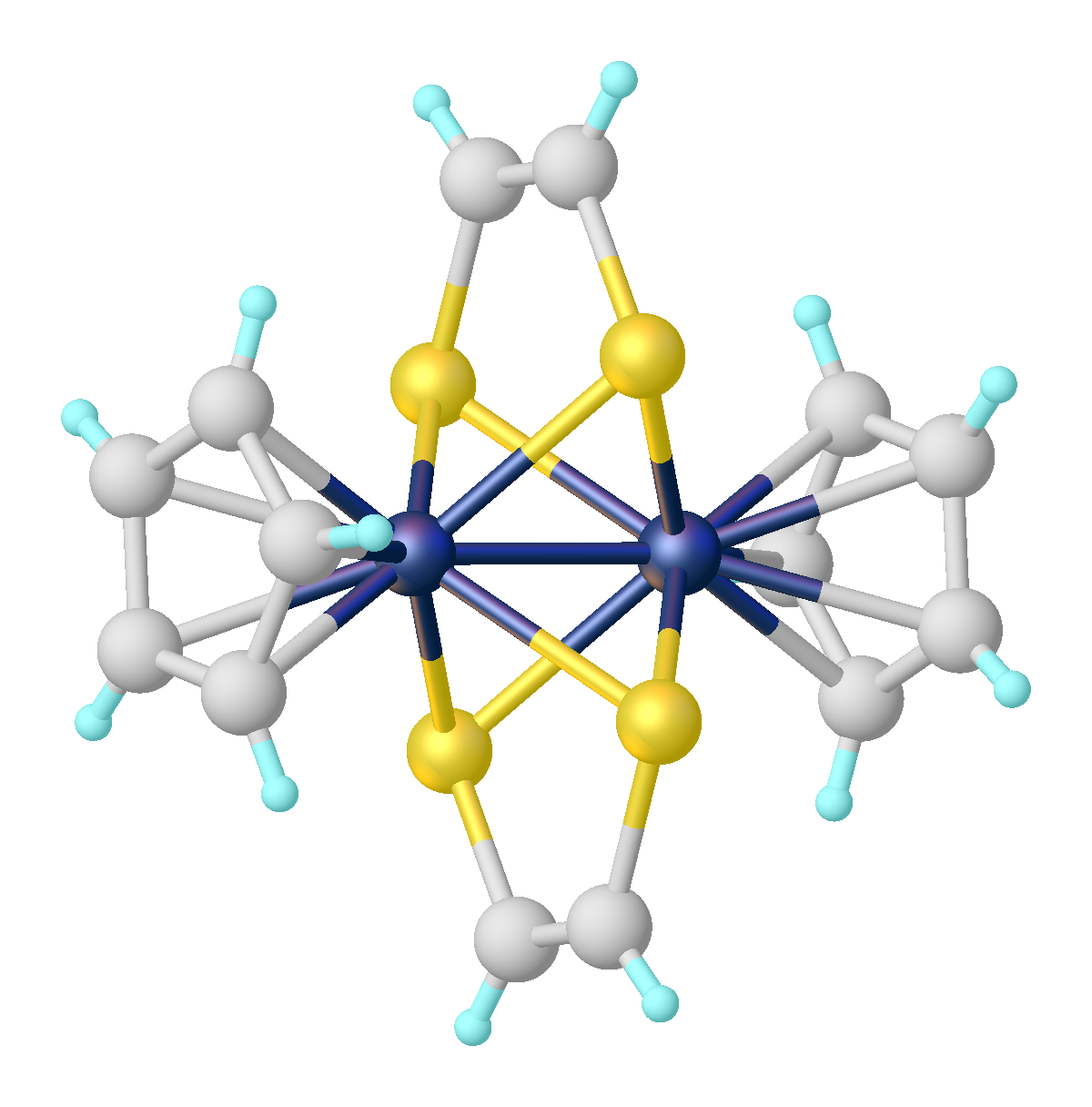
Structure of Cp_{2}Mo_{2}(S_{2}C_{2}H_{2})_{2}, prepared by the Rakowski DuBois group by addition of acetylene to Cp_{2}Mo_{2}S_{4}.

Early in her independent career, while on the faculty at the University of Colorado, she discovered that organomolybdenum sulfides activated hydrogen. This work provided a mechanistic connection between the Mo-S catalysts used in hydrodesulfurization and molecular organometallic chemistry.

== Awards ==
Rakowski DuBois has been honored with fellowships from Alfred P. Sloan (1981), Dreyfus (1981), and Guggenheim Foundations (1984).
