= C6H14N2 =

The molecular formula C_{6}H_{14}N_{2} may refer to:

- 1,2-Cyclohexanediamine, a mixture of the two diastereoisomers
  - trans-1,2-Diaminocyclohexane
  - cis-1,2-Diaminocyclohexane
- 1,5-Diazacyclooctane, a cyclic diamine
