= William C. Brocklesby =

American architect (1847–1910)

William Claiborne Brocklesby
- Born: May 28, 1847; Hartford, Connecticut
- Died: October 9, 1910 (aged 63); Hartford, Connecticut
- Occupation: Architect

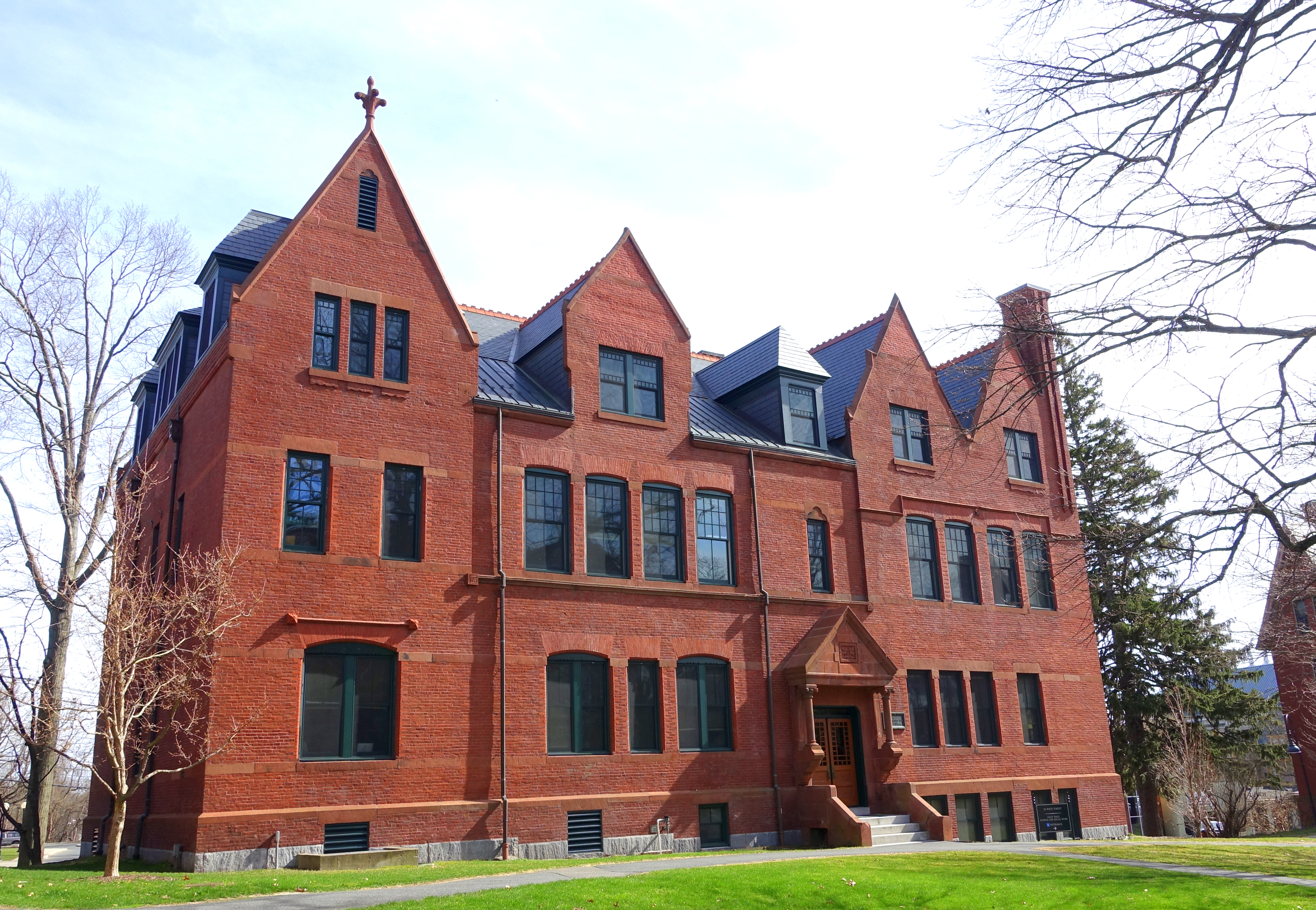
Lilly Hall, Smith College, Northampton, Massachusetts, 1886.

William C. Brocklesby (1847-1910) was an American architect practicing in Hartford, Connecticut.

== Life and career ==
William Claiborne Brocklesby was born May 28, 1847, in Hartford, Connecticut. He attended the public schools of Hartford before entering Trinity College, where his father, John Brocklesby, was a professor. After his graduation in 1869, he studied in the office of New York architect Richard Upjohn. In 1878, he established his own practice in Hartford. He practiced alone until 1904, when he established a partnership with H. Hilliard Smith, an employee of several years. Brocklesby & Smith was active until Brocklesby's death in late 1910. The following year, Smith would reorganize the office as Smith & Bassette.

Brocklesby was elected an associate of the American Institute of Architects in 1901. He died in Hartford on October 9, 1910.

== Personal life ==
Brocklesby was married in 1876 to Grace Chetwood Stuart, daughter of Isaac William Stuart, a local author and historian.

== Legacy ==
Several of Brocklesby's works have been individually listed on the United States National Register of Historic Places, and others contribute to listed historic districts. In addition to his projects in and around Hartford, Brocklesby built extensively on the campus of Smith College in Northampton, Massachusetts and on others in Massachusetts.

== Architectural works ==
- St. James Episcopal Church (former), (Note: Now vacant, at the corner of Linden and County Streets.) New Bedford, Massachusetts (1878)
- St. Mark Episcopal Church (former), Adams, Massachusetts (1881)
- Congregational Church of Great Barrington, Great Barrington, Massachusetts (1882–83, NRHP-listed 1992)
- Adams Town Hall, Adams, Massachusetts (1885, altered 1949)
- South College, University of Massachusetts, Amherst, Massachusetts (1885)
- Gymnasium and Alumni Hall, Trinity College, Hartford, Connecticut (1886–87, demolished)
- Lilly Hall, Smith College, Northampton, Massachusetts (1886)
- Raymond Library, East Hartford, Connecticut (1889)
- Academy of Music, Northampton, Massachusetts (1890–91)
- Alumnae Gymnasium, Smith College, Northampton, Massachusetts (1891, NRHP-listed 1976)
- Forbes Library (host of the Calvin Coolidge Presidential Library and Museum), Northampton, Massachusetts (1891–94)
- Lawrence and Morris Houses, Smith College, Northampton, Massachusetts (1891)
- National Fire Insurance Company Building, Hartford, Connecticut (1893, demolished)
- New Britain High School, New Britain, Connecticut (1896, NRHP-listed 2015)
- Brigham Hall, Mount Holyoke College, South Hadley, Massachusetts (1897)
- Catlin Building, Hartford, Connecticut (1897, demolished 1911)
- Tyler House, Smith College, Northampton, Massachusetts (1898)
- Blanchard Hall, Mount Holyoke College, South Hadley, Massachusetts (1899)
- St. Philip Episcopal Church, Putnam, Connecticut (1899)
- Albright House, Smith College, Northampton, Massachusetts (1900)
- Boardman Hall of Natural History, Trinity College, Hartford, Connecticut (1900, demolished 1971)
- Alumni House, Phillips Academy, Andover, Massachusetts (1901)
- Noah Webster School, Hartford, Connecticut (1901)
- Universalist Church of the Redeemer, Hartford, Connecticut (1906, demolished)

== Gallery of architectural works ==
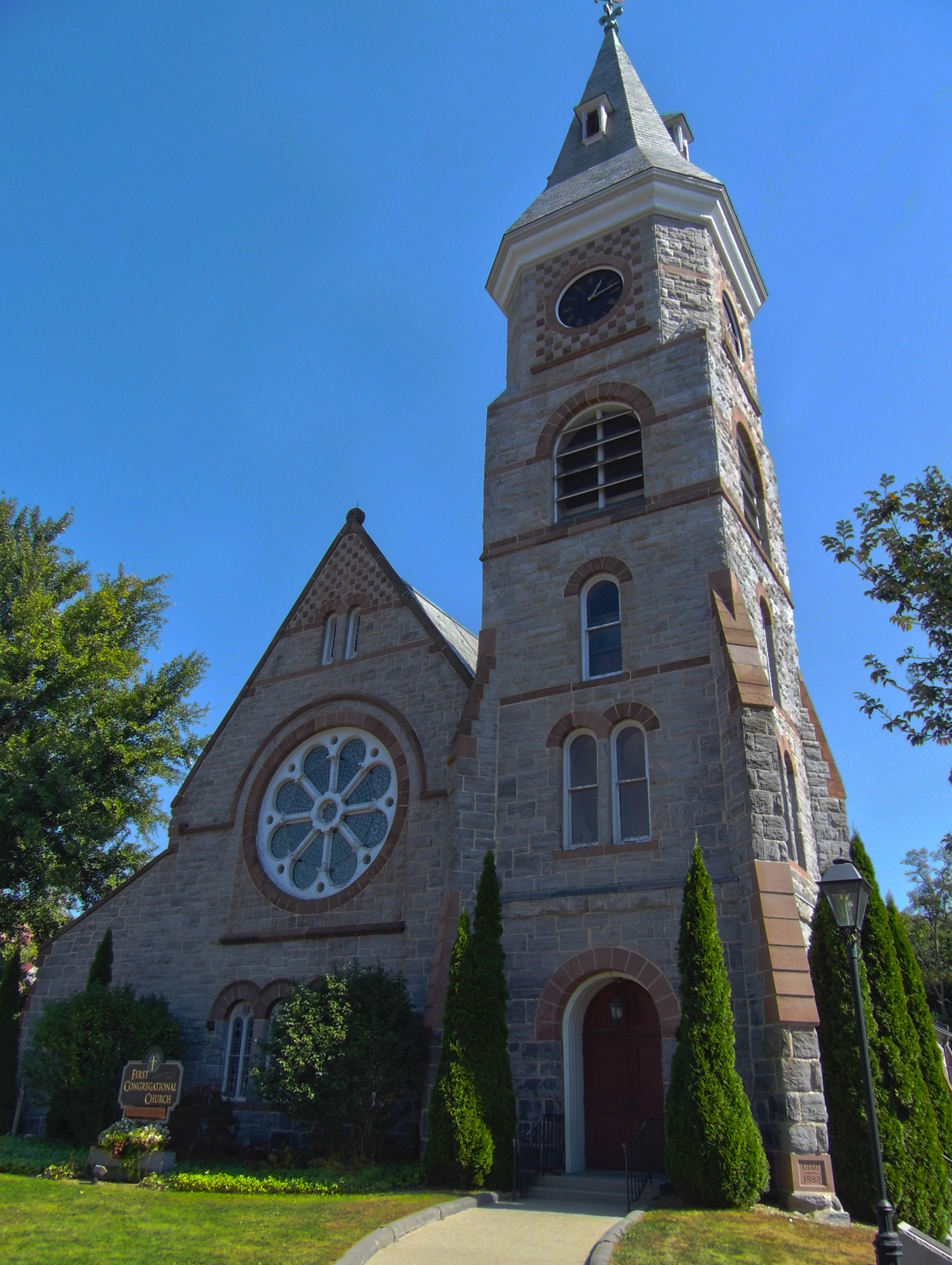
Congregational Church of Great Barrington, Great Barrington, Massachusetts, 1882-83.

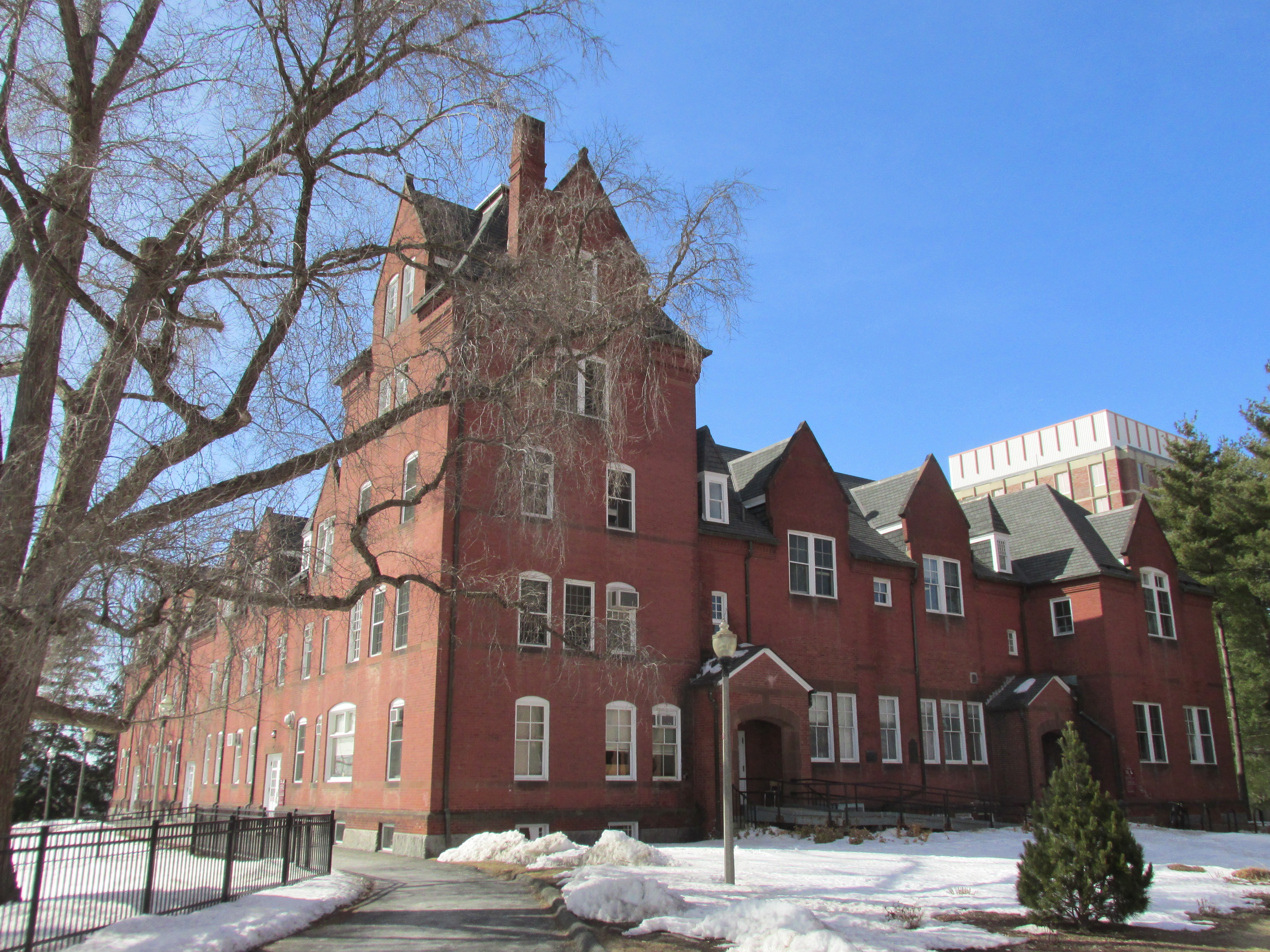
South College, University of Massachusetts, Amherst, Massachusetts, 1885.

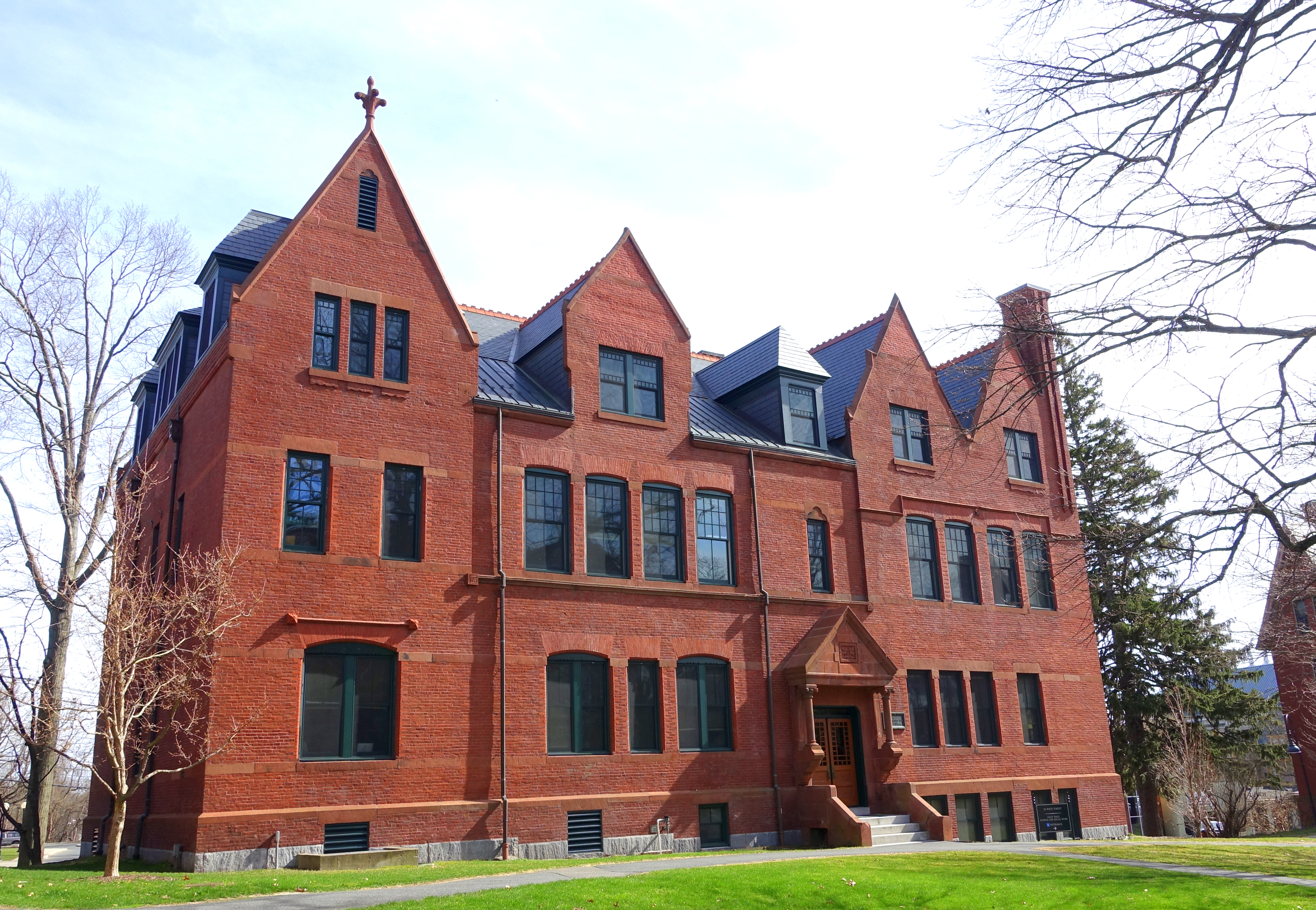
Lilly Hall, Smith College, Northampton, Massachusetts, 1886.

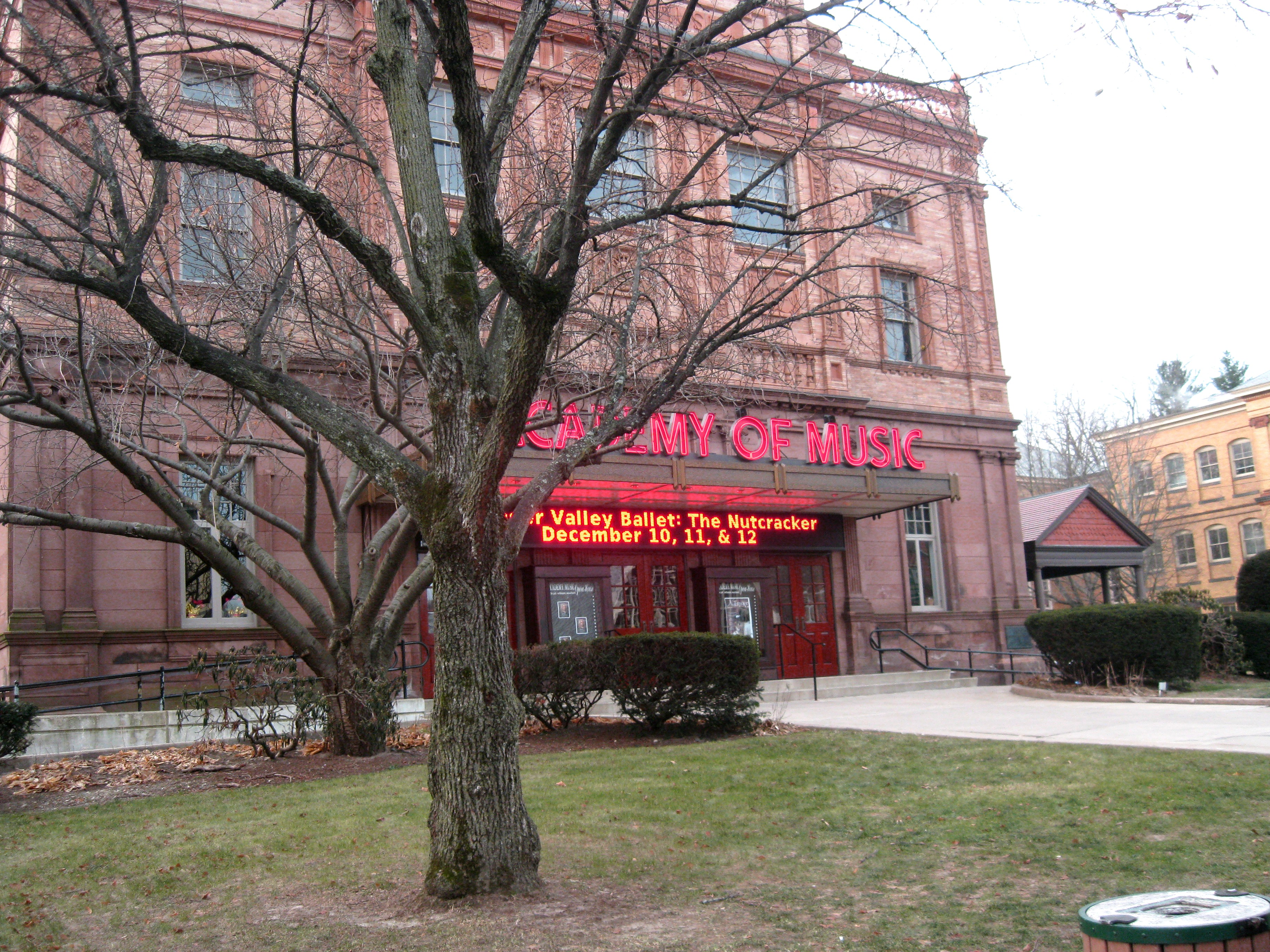
Academy of Music, Northampton, Massachusetts, 1890-91.

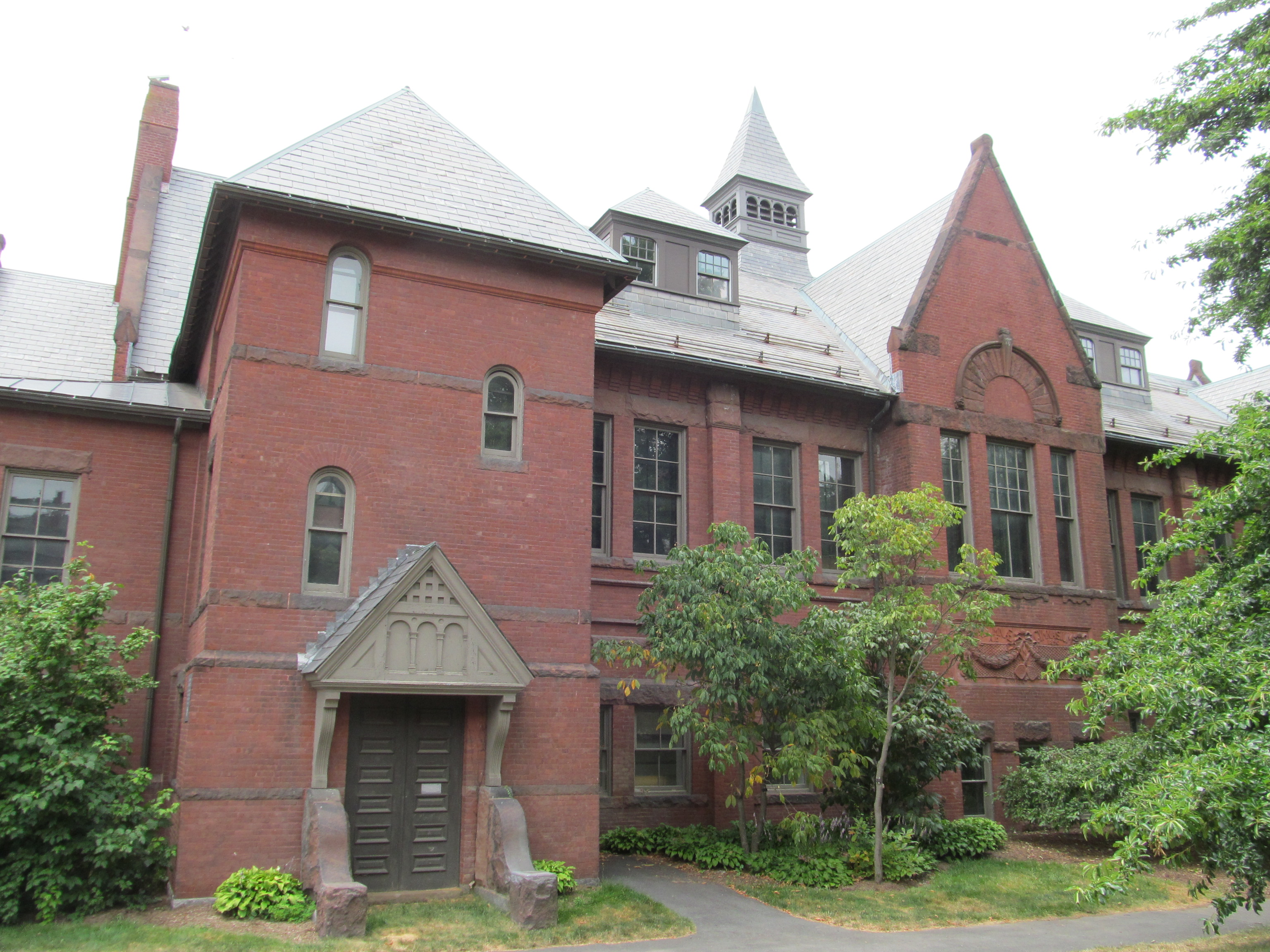
Alumnae Gymnasium, Smith College, Northampton, Massachusetts, 1891.

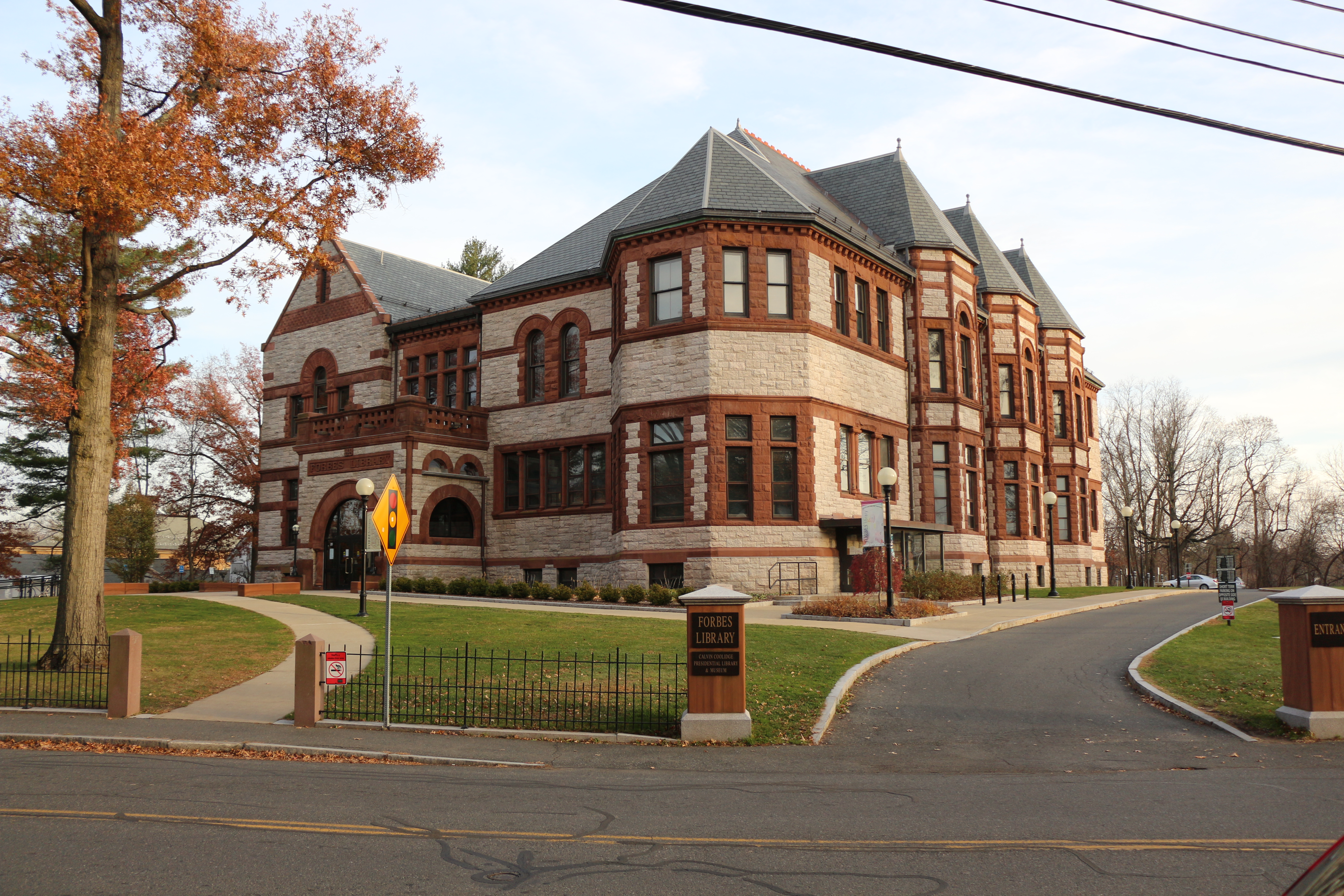
Forbes Library, Northampton, Massachusetts, 1891-94.

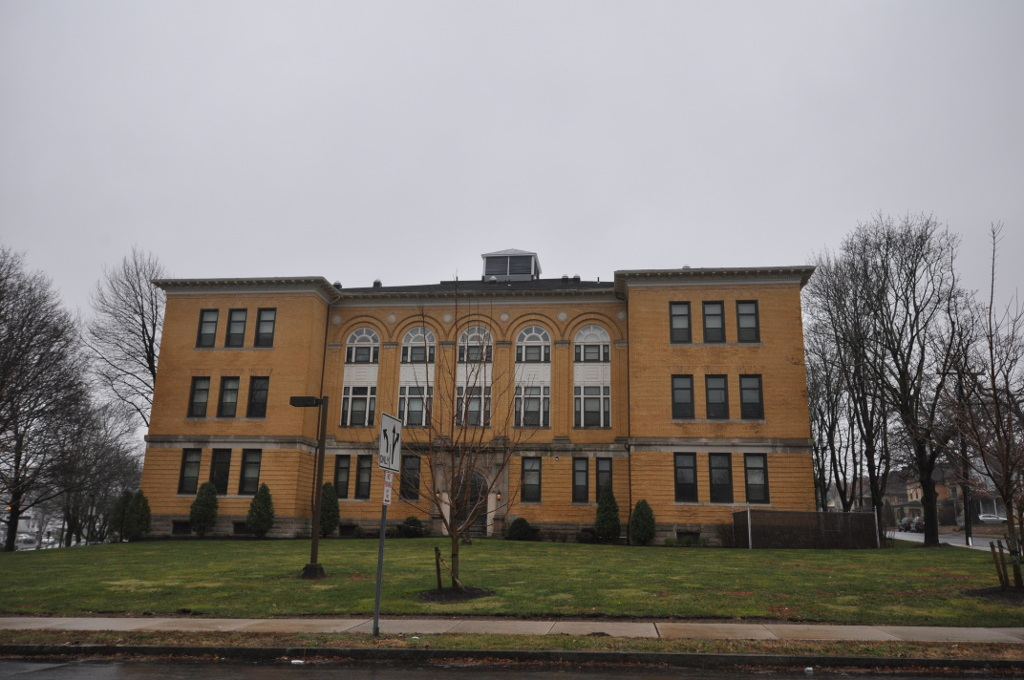
New Britain High School, New Britain, Connecticut, 1896.

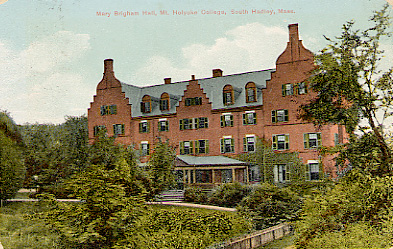
Brigham Hall, Mount Holyoke College, South Hadley, Massachusetts, 1897.

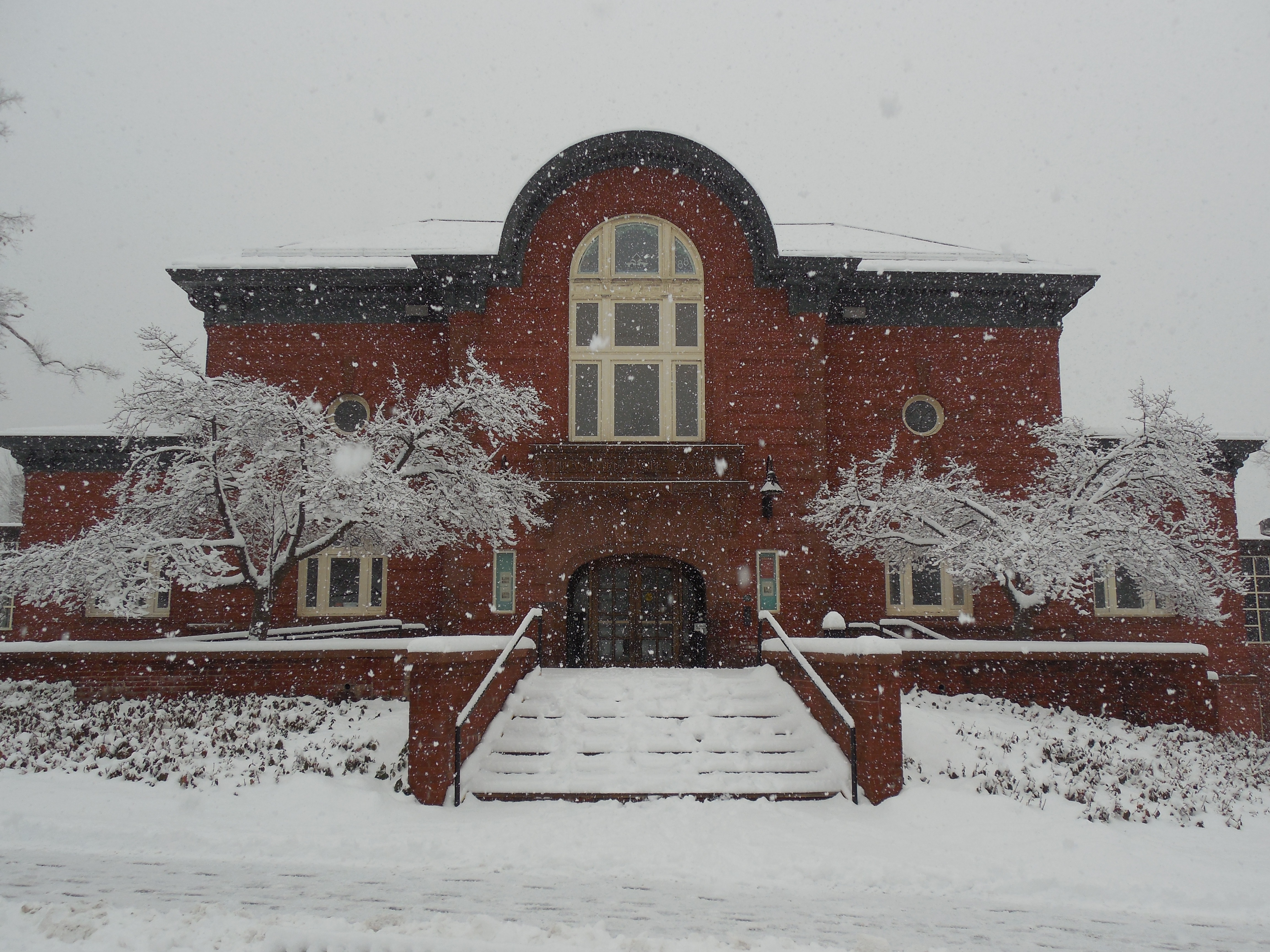
Blanchard Hall, Mount Holyoke College, South Hadley, Massachusetts, 1899.
