= C5H12N2 =

The molecular formula C_{5}H_{12}N_{2} (molar mass: 100.16 g/mol) may refer to:

- 1,4-Diazacycloheptane, a colorless, oily cyclic diamine
- Methylpiperazine, a heterocyclic organic compound
