= 1892 in basketball =

The following are the basketball events of the year 1892 throughout the world.

== Events ==
- January 15 – James Naismith's rules for basketball are published for the first time in the Springfield YMCA International Training School's newspaper, in an article titled "A New Game."
- January 20 – The first official basketball game is played in the YMCA gymnasium in Springfield, Massachusetts.
- March 11 – First basketball game played in public, between students and faculty at the Springfield YMCA. The final score was 5–1 in favor of the students, with the only goal for the faculty being scored by Amos Alonzo Stagg. A crowd of 200 spectators watched the game.
- June 1 – Senda Berenson appointed athletic director at Smith College.

== Births ==
- July 9 – Elmer Oliphant, All-American at Purdue (died 1975)
