= Daryle =

Daryle is a given name. Notable people with the name include:

- Daryle H. Busch (1928–2021), American inorganic chemist
- Daryle Lamont Jenkins (born 1968), American political activist
- Daryle Lamonica (1941–2022), American football quarterback
- Daryle Singletary (1971–2018), American country music singer
- Daryle Skaugstad (born 1957), former nose tackle in the National Football League
- Daryle Smith (1964–2010), American football offensive tackle
- Daryle Ward (born 1975), American former professional baseball
