= C24H31N3O =

The molecular formula C_{24}H_{31}N_{3}O (molar mass: 377.532 g/mol) may refer to:

- Homopipramol
- Famprofazone
- IHCH-7086
