= David Leavitt (banker) =

American industrialist and banker (1791–1879)

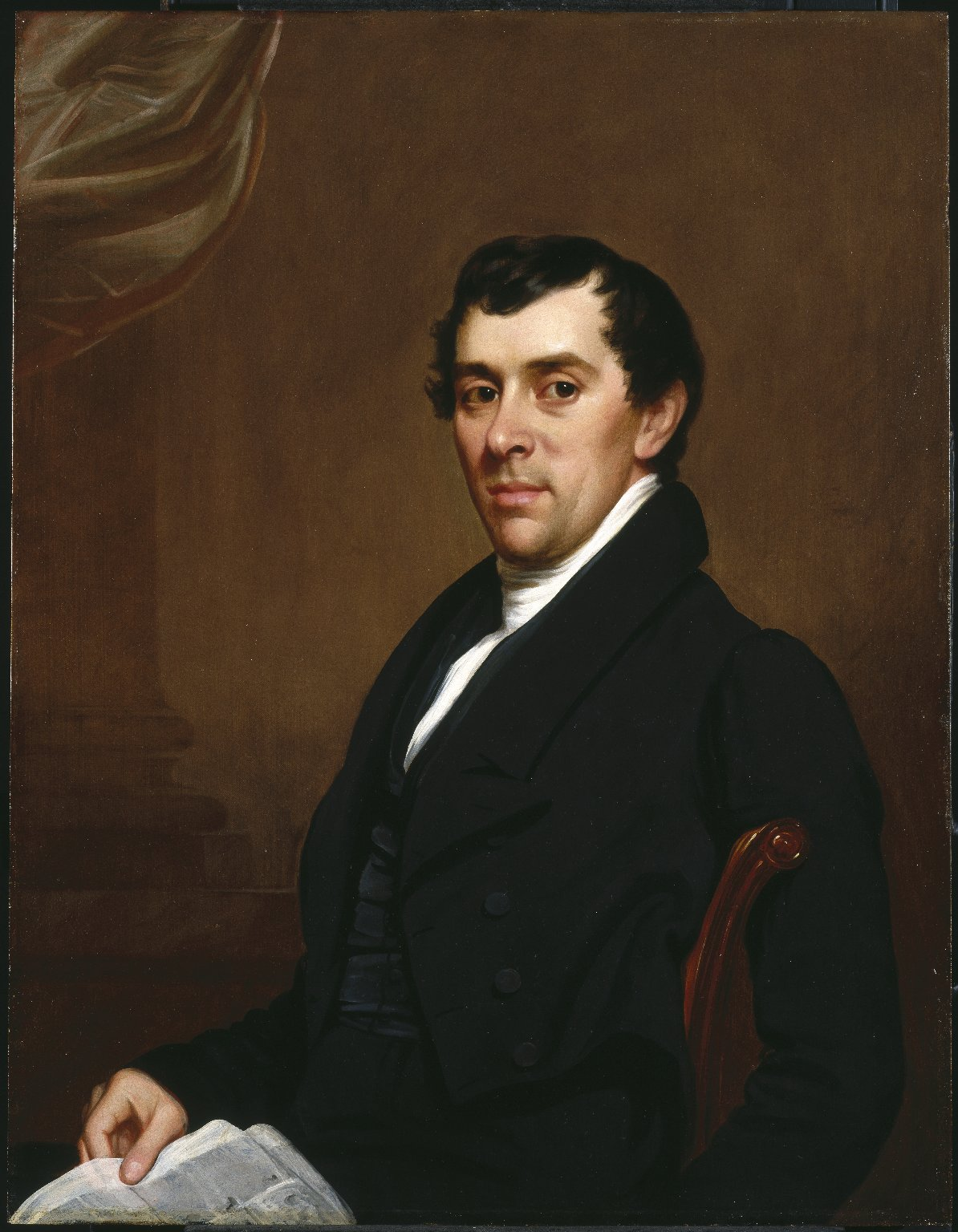
- Portrait, c. 1820
- Born: David Leavitt Jr. August 29, 1791; Bethlehem, Connecticut, U.S.
- Died: December 30, 1879 (aged 88); Manhattan, New York City, U.S.
- Occupations: Industrialist; banker; financier
- Spouse: Maria Lewis (m. 1814)
- Children: 4

David Leavitt Jr. (August 29, 1791 – December 30, 1879) was an American industrialist, banker, and financier. As president of the American Exchange Bank of New York during the Financial Panic of 1837 he represented bondholders of the nascent Illinois and Michigan Canal, allowing completion of the historic canal linking the Midwest with the East Coast.

For his role in helping prevent the collapse of the canal scheme, Chicago authorities named Leavitt Street after the financier. Leavitt was also an early art collector, and many of the artist Emanuel Leutze's paintings, including that of Washington at Valley Forge, were initially in Leavitt's collection housed at his Great Barrington, Massachusetts estate.

== Biography ==
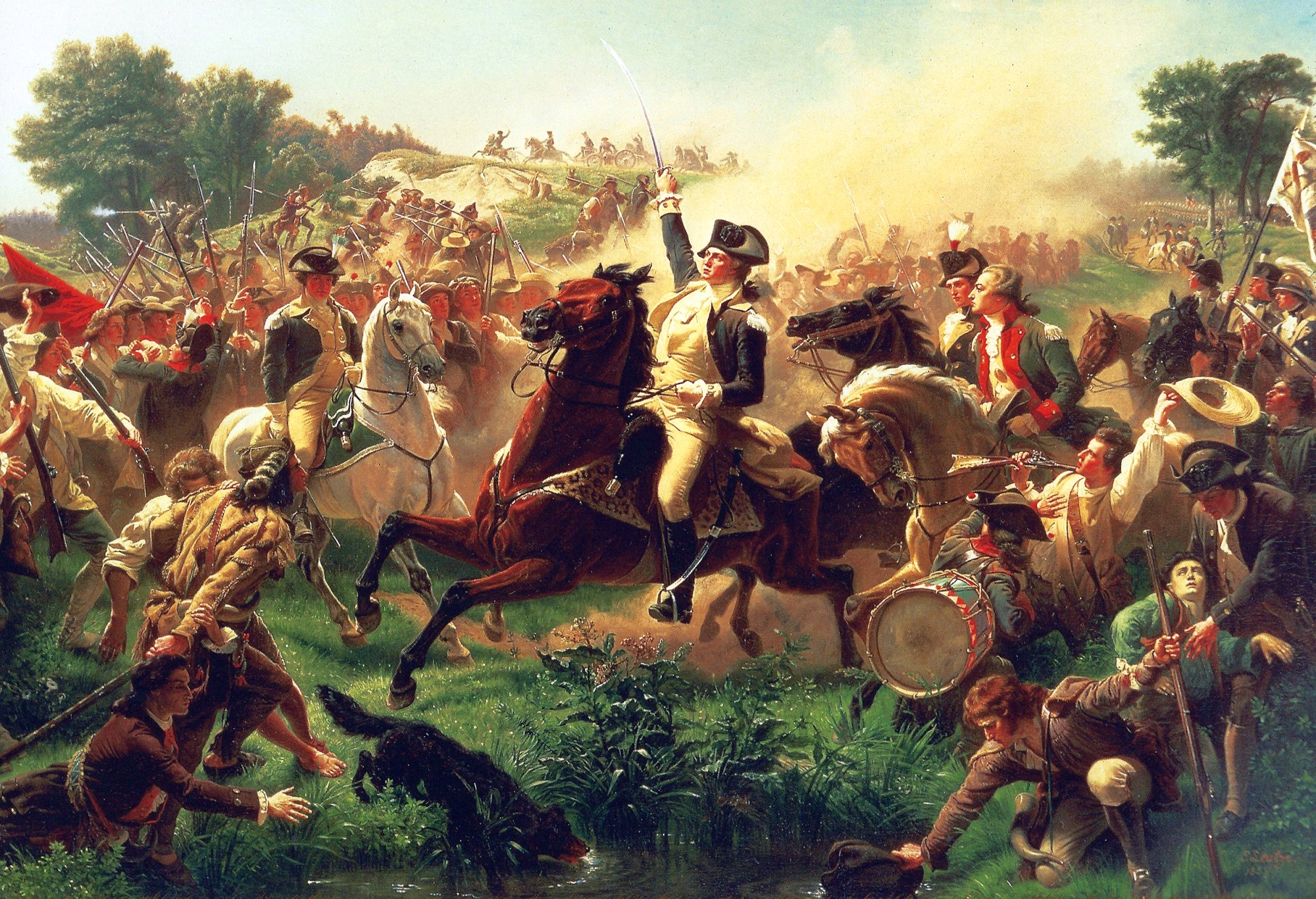
Washington at Monmouth, painted by Emanuel Leutze, 1852. Commissioned by Leutze's patron David Leavitt, Doe Memorial Library, University of California, Berkeley

David Leavitt was born in Bethlehem, Connecticut on August 29, 1791, to merchant and Connecticut legislator David Leavitt Sr. and his wife Lucy (Clark) Leavitt. The ambitious David Leavitt Jr. left rural Connecticut in 1813 at age 22 for New York City, where he began his career as a clerk in a produce and commission house. Three years later Leavitt's father died and, after inheriting a share of the elder Leavitt's estate, the son David Leavitt set himself up as a New York merchant and financier.

By 1815, Leavitt had gone into business with David Lee at 133 Front Street in Manhattan in the firm of Leavitt & Lee, wholesalers in the grocery business. By 1820 Leavitt & Lee had moved to 127 Front Street, and shortly afterwards the two partners dissolved their business. Leavitt left the grocery business and decided to set himself up as a financier. He decided to go it alone.

In one of Leavitt's first transactions, he bought an entire cargo of tea which the merchant John Jacob Astor had imported. When the German immigrant Astor inquired of Leavitt how he intended to pay for the cargo, Leavitt produced from his pocket a handful of notes written by Astor on his account, which Leavitt had bought up on the street.

In Leavitt's next large transactions, the 25-year-old Leavitt again demonstrated his business acumen. The government of Colombia, facing a conflict at home, had paid a group of New York merchants to build a warship and equip it with armaments for use by the South American nation. Ultimately, those building the vessel were unable to complete the transaction, and Leavitt stepped in, paying for the ship's construction, and assuring that the United States government would help arm it with munitions. Leavitt then took command of the vessel, sailing it to South America, where the Colombian government paid him $100,000 in Colombian currency, and an additional $100,000 in a London bank draft.

On his way home, Leavitt stopped in Havana, where he converted the Colombian currency into Spanish doubloons, which he converted back into dollars when demand for doubloons soared. The London bank draft finally cleared in its entirety after several years' delay, during which Leavitt bided his time instead of selling the draft at a discount. The entire transaction had netted Leavitt a tidy profit, which he invested in other ventures.

In 1823, a local businessman had established a manufactory for white lead in the emerging city of Brooklyn. Acting as a lender to the business from its inception, Leavitt stepped in to take control in 1825 and founded the Brooklyn White Lead Company, later Dutch Boy Paint. Much of Leavitt's wealth derived from his early investment in lead manufacturing and importing.

Leavitt had already had a home built in Brooklyn, where he took up residence with his wife Maria Clarissa (Lewis), a native of Goshen, Connecticut. At the time of Leavitt's move to Brooklyn, there were only three homes visible from his own, and the New York merchant later bought up large tracts of Brooklyn real estate, and became a trustee of the village of Brooklyn Heights.

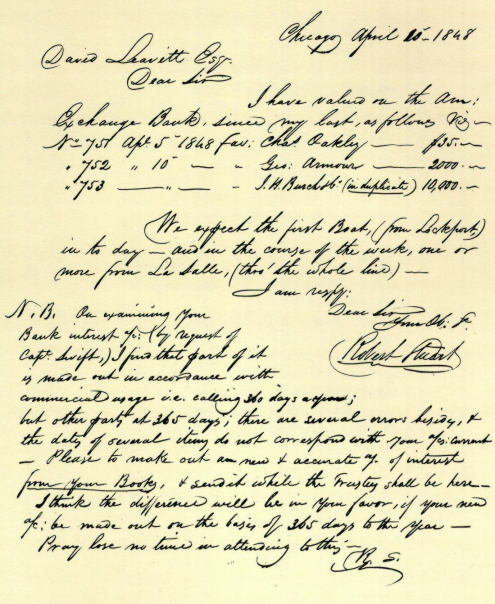
Letter to New York City banker David Leavitt, representing lenders to the Illinois and Michigan Canal of the opening of the waterway. 10 May 1848

Leavitt also owned and operated the Fulton Street Ferry, until popular sentiment against his large monopolies put an end to his ownership. In 1843, he financed construction of an elegant mansion in Brooklyn Heights, which he sold a decade later to Henry C. Bowen. (The Leavitt-Bowen Mansion was demolished in 1904). During this time, Brooklyn Heights was the residence of increasing numbers of New York City's most prominent merchants.

Seeking to find uses for his accumulated capital, Leavitt entered into several banking ventures. He was elected president of the Fulton Bank of New York City. Later, in 1838, he became president of the American Exchange Bank, a large lending institution headquartered in Manhattan, with which he served for 16 years. During his tenure at American Exchange, there was a financial panic, during which European bondholders of the State of Illinois declared their intention to foreclose on the bonds issuer. "Grave fears were entertained that the bonds would not be paid", wrote The New York Times, "and several financiers had failed in placing them in the European market, but by pledging his own credit, Mr. Leavitt succeeded in creating a degree of confidence in the scheme, and it was a source of pride to him in after years that all the holders of the bonds eventually received both principal and interest." To reassure the bondholders, Leavitt not only advanced his own funds, but traveled to England to meet jittery European stakeholders.

For Leavitt's role in averting the bond collapse, and allowing construction of the Illinois and Michigan Canal to the growing city of Chicago, city elders ultimately named Leavitt Street after him. At the opening of the canal in April 1848, Leavitt – and the only other trustee of the canal's bondholders who had personally intervened to float the $1.6 million loan to complete the project – were feted at the opening ceremonies.

Leavitt acted as financier through the decades for other banks and financing packages. He served as Receiver of the North American Trust and Banking Company. In 1857, during another financial panic which swept the markets, Leavitt took to the steps of the American Exchange Bank building, where he addressed depositors, assuring them the institution would meet its obligations and stemming a run on the bank. By 1861, when The Merchants' and Bankers' Almanac was published by Bankers' Magazine, the portrait of David Leavitt, along with those of George Peabody, Albert Gallatin, Erastus Corning, and Stephen Girard, graced the periodical's cover.

Leavitt later built a 300-acre (1.2 km^{2}) estate called Brookside in the Massachusetts Berkshires at Great Barrington, Massachusetts, where he established a gallery for his growing art collection, especially the works of Emanuel Leutze, from whom Leavitt had commissioned The Battle of Monmouth. Leavitt was also painted in a portrait during his lifetime by the artist Francis Bicknell Carpenter. During his time in Massachusetts, Leavitt was chosen president of the Housatonic Railroad. At the outbreak of the Civil War, Leavitt was named permanent chairman of Great Barrington's committee to aid the Union effort. At the meeting, chairman Leavitt "proclaimed himself willing to contribute his means and, if necessary, his person, to the holy cause".

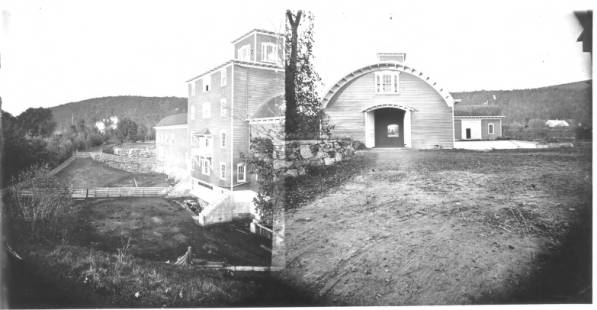
Barn at Brookside, Great Barrington, Massachusetts, estate of David Leavitt, Winterthur Museum

Leavitt built, in Gothic revival style, an enormous three-story 'cascade barn', measuring 200 feet (61 m)-by-40 feet (12 m), on his estate. The building received extensive write-ups in the following years, including one by Horace Greeley, for its mechanical ingenuity and devices, but nothing apart from the foundations remains today following an 1885 fire.

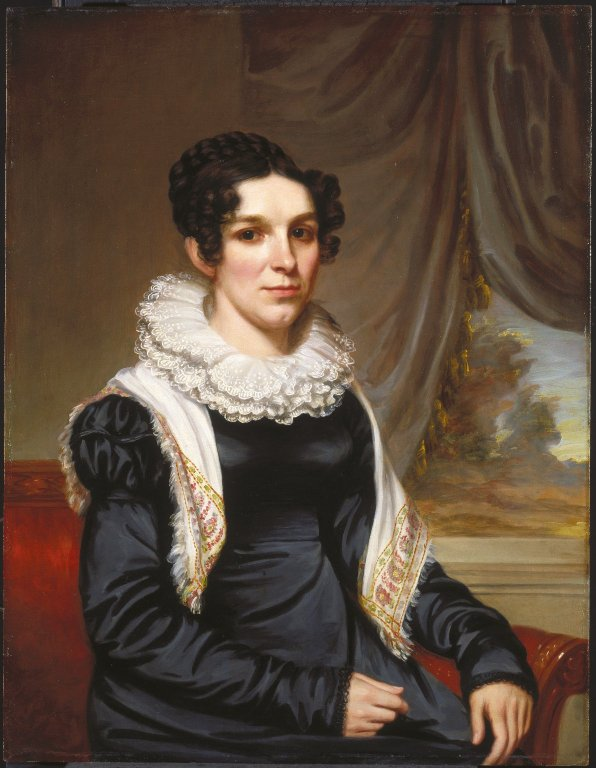
Maria Clarissa (Lewis) Leavitt, wife of David Leavitt, ca. 1820, Samuel Lovett Waldo, Brooklyn Museum of Art

David Leavitt died at the home of his son Edward in Manhattan on December 30, 1879, at age 88. His wife predeceased him, dying in 1867 at age 76 at the couple's Great Barrington estate. Leavitt was a longtime member of the First Presbyterian Church of Brooklyn, where he had worshipped for a half-century. While in Great Barrington, Leavitt attended the First Congregational Church of Great Barrington. David Leavitt and his wife had a daughter, Elizabeth Leavitt Howe, whose son and grandson became New Jersey bankers and lived at Fieldhead, the family estate in Princeton, New Jersey, as well as three sons, Edward, Henry and David Jr.

David Leavitt Jr., moved to Dresden, Germany, where daughter Louise Walcott Leavitt married Baron Franz Oswald Trützschler von Falkenstein. Her sister Helen Hudson Leavitt married Baron Adolf von Strahlenheim. Hugh Toler Leavitt, brother of the Baronesses, became a German Army officer.

David Leavitt's nephew David Leavitt Hough, a lawyer educated at Middlebury College, settled at LaSalle, Illinois, where he acted as an attorney for the Trustees of the Illinois and Michigan Canal.

== See also ==
- Illinois and Michigan Canal
- Emanuel Leutze
