= Smith Alumnae Gymnasium =

- U.S. National Register of Historic Places
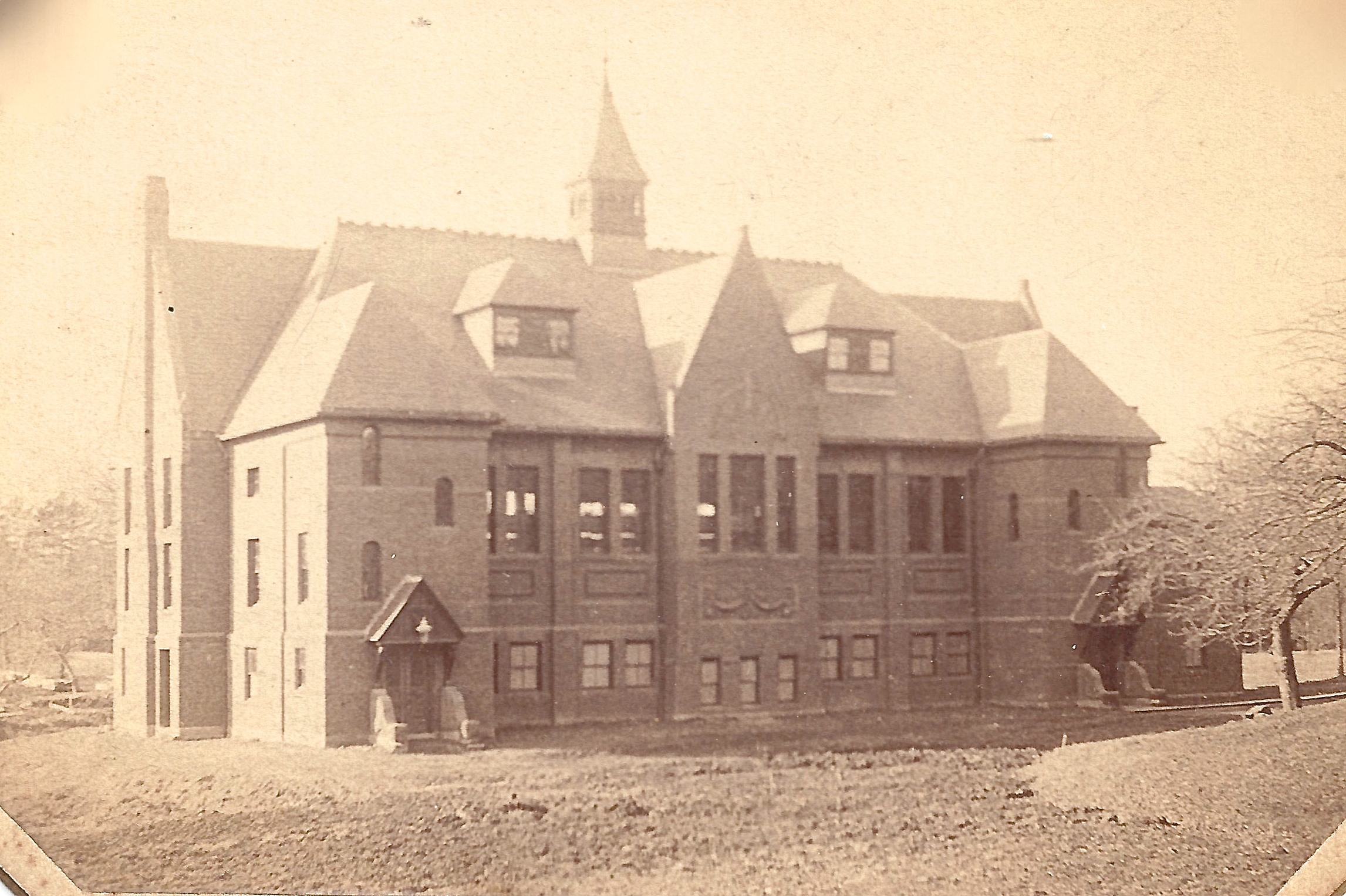
- Smith College Gymnasium built 1890/1891

- Location within Massachusetts Location within the United States
- Location: Northampton, Massachusetts
- Coordinates: 42°19′1″N 72°38′18″W
- Area: less than one acre
- Built: 1890
- Architect: William C. Brocklesby
- Architectural style: Gothic
- NRHP reference No.: 76000259
- Added to NRHP: April 30, 1976

The Smith Alumnae Gymnasium is a historic former athletic facility on the Smith College campus in Northampton, Massachusetts. Located facing Burton Lawn, it was built in 1890 as a fine addition to the adjacent Gothic style buildings. The building now houses the college's archives, and was connected by the adjacent Neilson Library by a bridge in 1982. It is the first place in which a formal women's basketball game was played, in 1892, and is one of the first American athletic facilities built specifically for women. The building was listed on the National Register of Historic Places in 1976.

== Description and history ==
The former Smith Alumnae Gymnasium is located in the central part of the Smith College Campus, immediately south of Neilson Library and north of Green Street. It faces the college's Burton Lawn, along with other buildings of the campus that were designed by Peabody & Stearns. It is built out of red brick with brownstone trim, with Late Gothic style that complements the surrounding buildings. Its main roofline is steeply pitched and hipped, with a small square cupola with flared roof at the center. From the main roof, a series of gabled and hip-roofed sections project, as do several smaller hip-roofed dormers. Most windows are rectangulas sash, but there are round-arch windows which illuminate the projecting stairwells.

The gymnasium was built in 1890 to a design by William C. Brocklesby of Hartford, Connecticut. It replaced an older wood-frame structure that was part of the original Peabody & Stearns plan for the campus, and was built in 1879. Brocklesby is credited with the design of nine buildings on the Smith campus. It was here that Senda Berenson Abbott, the college's directory of physical education, adapted the then-new game of basketball for women, and where the first formal women's basketball game was played.

In the 1970s, the school first planned to demolish the building as part of a planned expansion of Neilson Library. This was protested by the campus community, and was eventually replaced by a proposal to move the building 200 feet (61 m) to make way for the expansion. In 1982, the building underwent renovation, and was connected to the library via a bridge.

== Gallery ==
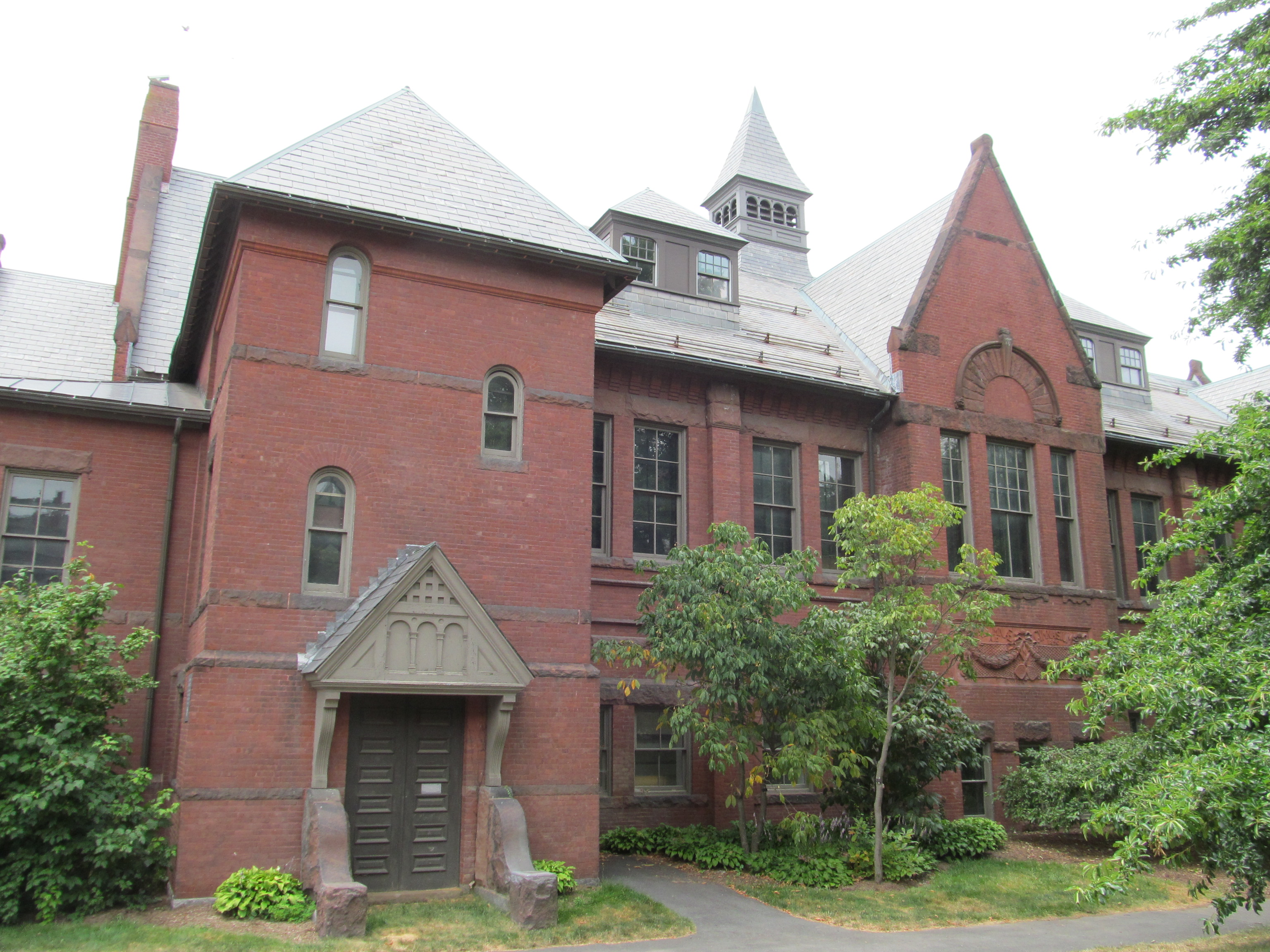
Smith Alumnae Gymnasium (2012)

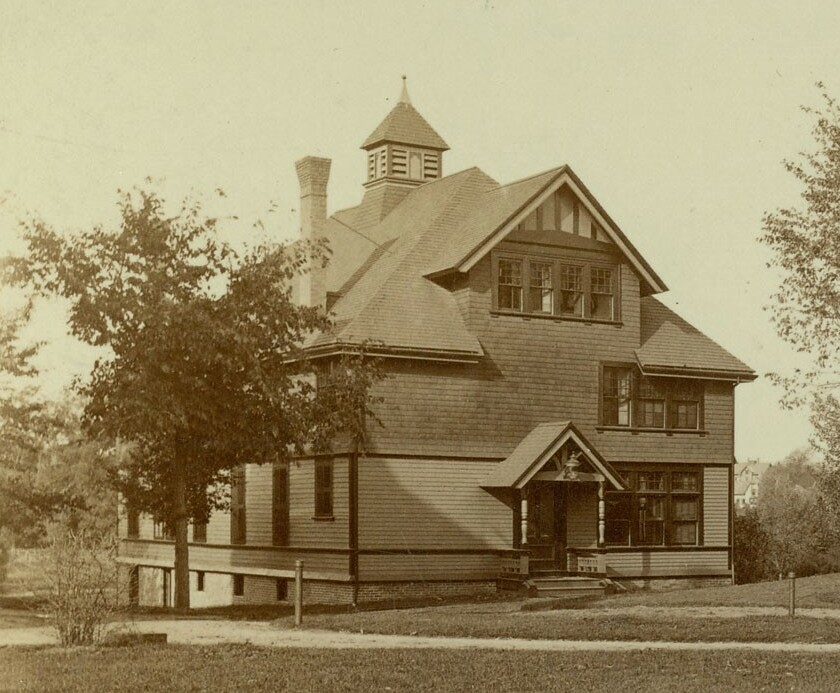
Original 1879 gymnasium designed by Peabody & Stearns

== See also ==
- National Register of Historic Places listings in Hampshire County, Massachusetts
