= Society of the Congregational Church of Great Barrington =

Historic church in Massachusetts, United States

- U.S. National Register of Historic Places
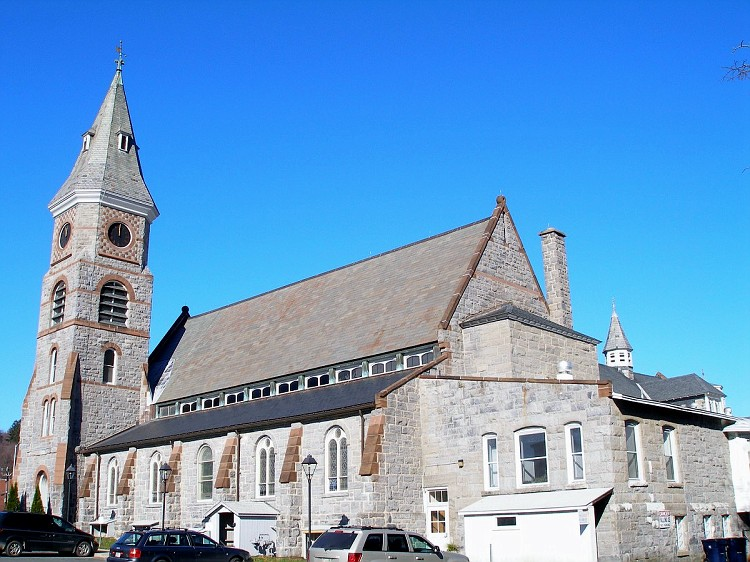
- 2006 photo

- Location within Massachusetts Location within the United States
- Location: Great Barrington, Massachusetts
- Coordinates: 42°11′43″N 73°21′41″W
- Built: 1883
- Architect: William C. Brocklesby et al.
- Architectural style: Romanesque
- NRHP reference No.: 92000999
- Added to NRHP: August 20, 1992

The Society of the Congregational Church of Great Barrington (also known as First Congregational Church of Great Barrington) is a historic church building and parish house located at 241 and 251 Main Street in Great Barrington, Massachusetts. It is the fourth church of a congregation whose first meetings were held in 1743.

== History ==
In 1743 the congregation was founded by Samuel Hopkins, an early proponent of the theology of New Divinity. In 1883 the current stone church building was completed after a fire destroyed most of the previous structure, which had been built of locally quarried stone in 1859. In 1883 the congregation also accepted the donation by the Hopkins family of a house to be used as a parish hall. This building, also faced in local stone, was designed by Peabody & Stearns, and was previously located across the street from the church before being moved to its present location next to the church.

In the 1880s the church sponsored congregant W. E. B. Du Bois as he attended Fisk University. In 1992 the church building was added to the National Register of Historic Places.

== Architecture ==
The church is set in the heart of downtown Great Barrington, facing west toward Main Street. The church, along with its manse and carriage house, are all built of locally quarried limestone. The church is two stories in height, with a longitudinal nave whose walls are supported by buttresses. Its roof is steeply pitched, and covered in slate. A five-story tower, 116 feet (35 m) in height, rises at the southwest corner, and is topped by a pyramidal roof with flared edges. The church was built in 1883, using parts of the previous (1859) structure, which was built from stone sourced at the same quarry, and was destroyed by fire in 1882. The church was designed by William C. Brocklesby, an architect practicing in Hartford, Connecticut. The manse and carriage barn, added in 1884, were designed by Peabody and Stearns of Boston.

== Notable congregants ==
- David Leavitt
- W. E. B. Du Bois
- Mary Silvina Burghardt Du Bois

== See also ==
- National Register of Historic Places listings in Berkshire County, Massachusetts
