= Calvin Coolidge Presidential Library and Museum =

Library and museum for U.S. President

Calvin Coolidge Presidential Library
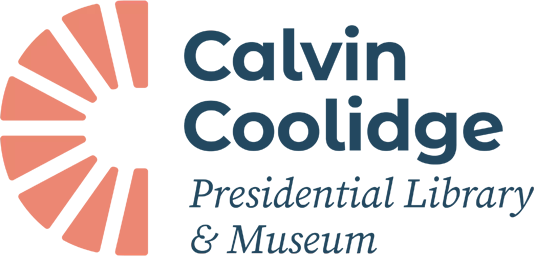

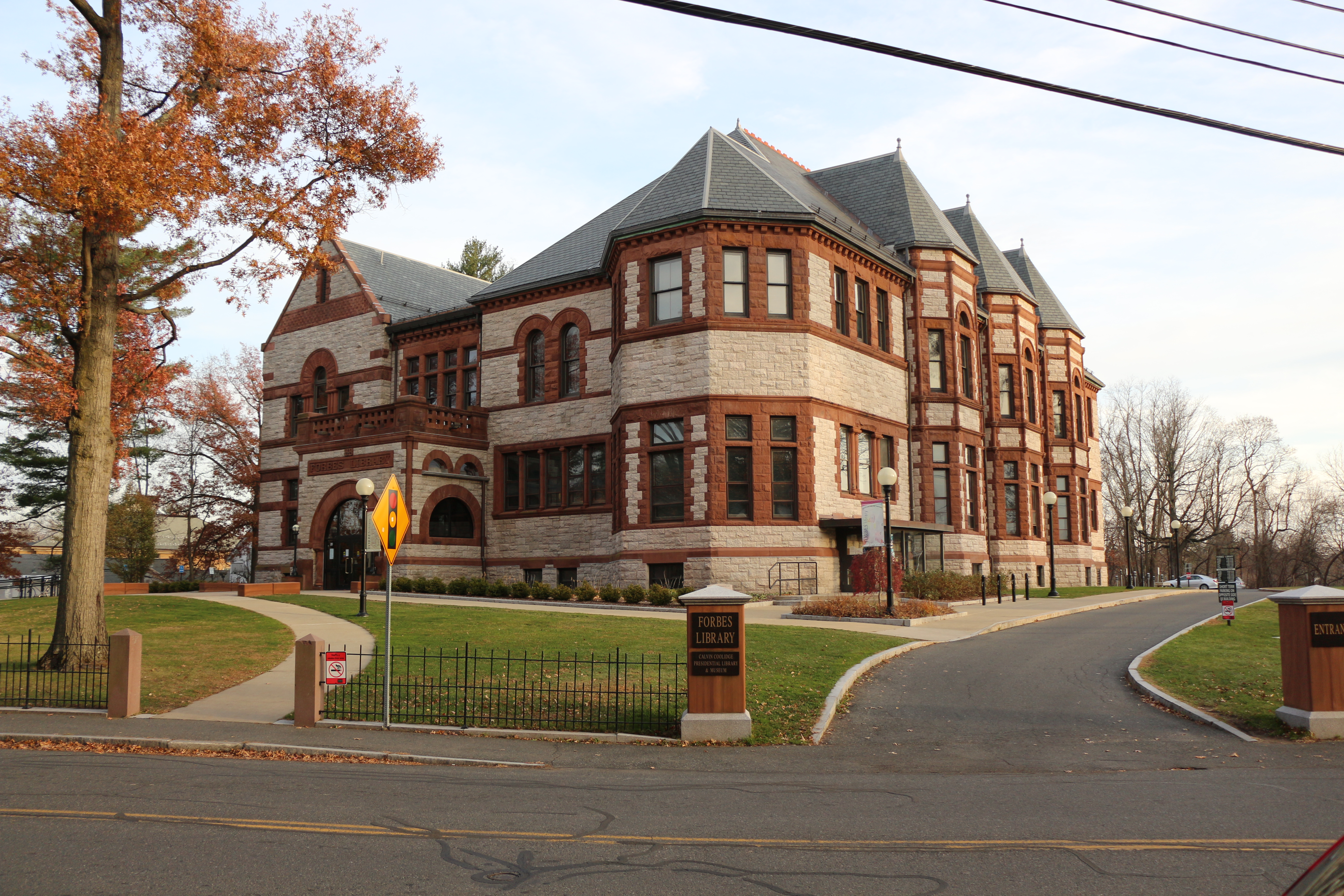
- Forbes Library, in November 2014

- Location within Massachusetts Location within the United States

General information
- Location: 20 West Street; Northampton, Massachusetts, United States
- Coordinates: 42.3168°N 72.6357°W
- Named for: Charles Edward Forbes; Calvin Coolidge
- Completed: October 23, 1894 (building)
- Operator: Forbes Library

Design and construction
- Architect: William C. Brocklesby

Website
- Calvin Coolidge Presidential Library and Museum

The Calvin Coolidge Presidential Library and Museum is the presidential library of 30th U.S. president Calvin Coolidge. Located in Northampton, Massachusetts, United States, the Calvin Coolidge Presidential Library and Museum is located inside the Forbes Library, which opened in 1894.

== Location ==
The library is located at the Forbes Library in Northampton, Massachusetts, where Coolidge practiced law and served as mayor.

== Foundation ==
The Coolidge Library began in 1920 when Coolidge began donating various records and memorabilia to the Forbes Library. This collection was furthered in 1956 when the Commonwealth of Massachusetts established the Calvin Coolidge Memorial Room at the behest of Grace Coolidge.

== See also ==
- Coolidge Homestead
- Calvin Coolidge House
- Presidential memorials in the United States
