= 1,5-Diazacyclooctane =

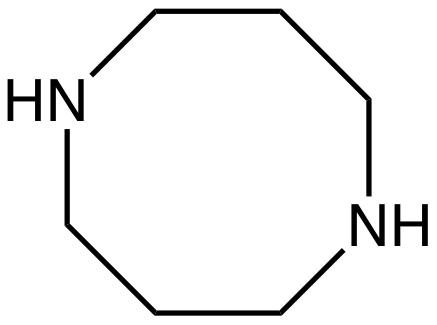

Names
- Preferred IUPAC name 1,5-Diazocane
- Other names DACO, octahydro-1,5-diazocine

Identifiers
CAS Number	5687-07-0
3D model (JSmol)	Interactive image
ChemSpider	4416083
PubChem CID	5248373
UNII	ZQ8KR7BLU5
CompTox Dashboard (EPA)	DTXSID701313786
- InChI: InChI=1S/C6H14N2/c1-3-7-5-2-6-8-4-1/h7-8H,1-6H2 Key: HTSQWLLKIZBMEO-UHFFFAOYSA-N
- SMILES: C1CNCCCNC1

Properties
Chemical formula	C_{6}H_{14}N_{2}
Molar mass	114.192 g·mol^{−1}
Appearance	colorless liquid
Boiling point	78–80 °C (172–176 °F; 351–353 K) 16 Torr
- Except where otherwise noted, data are given for materials in their standard state (at 25 °C [77 °F], 100 kPa). Infobox references

1,5-Diazacyclooctane is an organic compound with the formula (CH_{2}CH_{2}CH_{2}NH)_{2}. It is a colorless oil. 1,5-Diazacyclooctane is a cyclic diamine.

== Synthesis and reactions ==
It is prepared in low yield by the alkylation of ammonia with 1,3-dibromopropane.

The N-H centers can be replaced with many other groups. As a bis secondary amine, it condenses with aldehydes to give bicyclic derivatives. When treated with transition metal salts, it serves as a chelating ligand.

== Related compounds ==
- 1,4-Diazacycloheptane
- 1,5-Diaza-3,7-diphosphacyclooctanes
- Tröger's base
