= Academy of Music Theatre =

Coordinates: 42.3173°N 72.6336°W

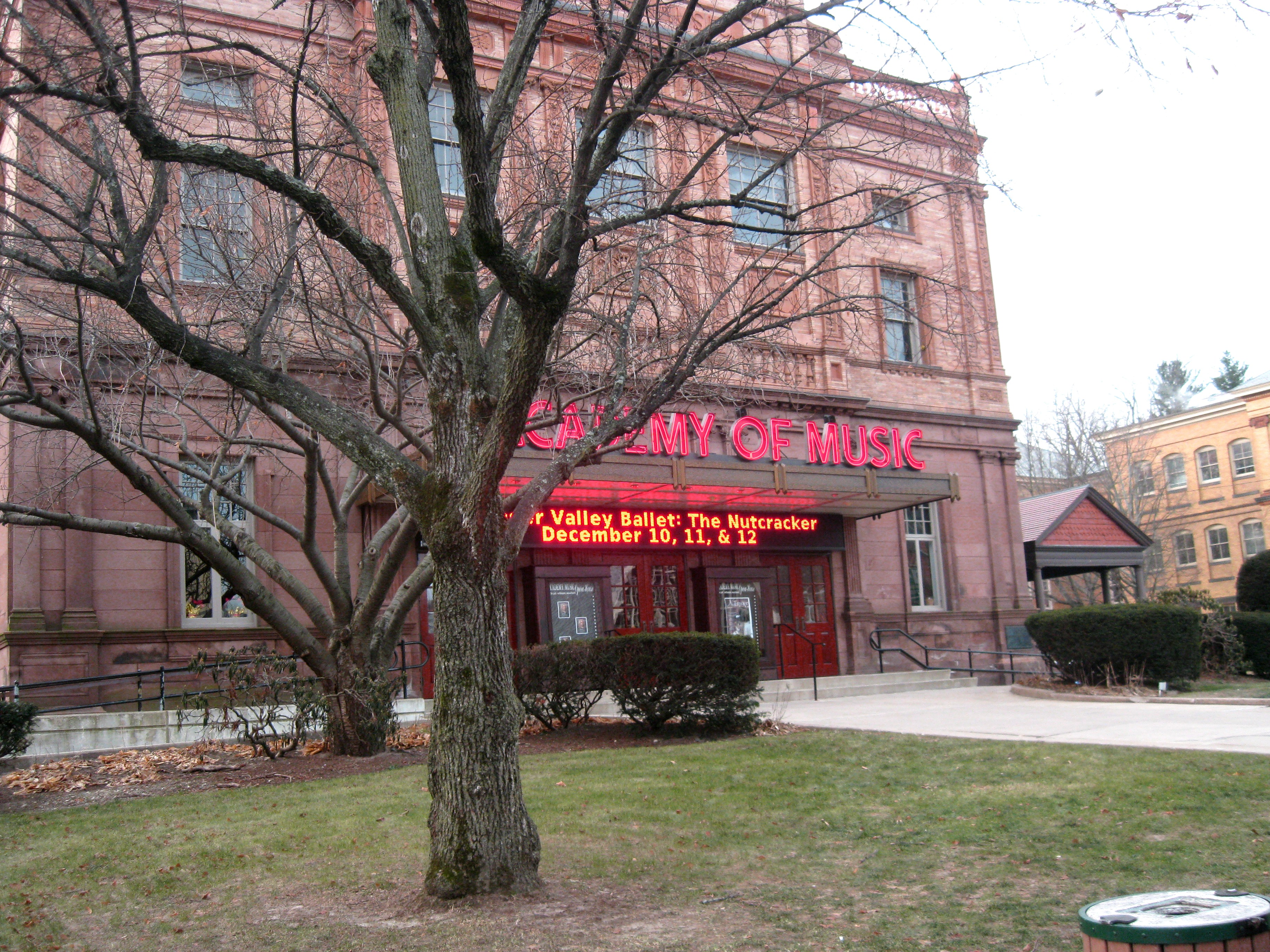
- The Academy of Music Theatre
- Interactive map of Academy of Music Theatre
- Address: 274 Main St., Northampton, MA 01060; Northampton; United States
- Owner: City of Northampton
- Capacity: 803 seats

Construction
- Opened: May 23, 1891

Website
- aomtheatre.com

The Academy of Music Theatre is located in and owned by the City of Northampton, Massachusetts.

== History ==
The Academy of Music was built by Edward H. R. Lyman in 1890. Lyman earned his wealth as a tea and silk merchant. He lived in New York City but was born in Northampton and kept a summer house there. On his travels abroad for business, particularly in Germany, he was struck by the impact of publicly-funded theaters on the communities he visited.

The building was designed by architect William C. Brocklesby of Hartford, Connecticut in the Renaissance Revival style. The reported cost was $100,000 for the 1,004 seat theater. The Academy was opened to the public on May 23, 1891. Lyman gave the theater to the city as a gift which required a bill to be passed through the state legislature. Upon opening in 1892, the Academy of Music was the first municipally owned theater in the United States.

The Northampton Players were the first theater company based out of the Academy of Music starting in 1912. Before 1912, the Academy depended on touring companies. At this time, the only other venues in Northampton were movie theaters.

== Present ==
The Academy of Music, Inc., is the operating entity for the building, and it is an independent, private, nonprofit, 501(c)(3) charitable organization governed by a board of trustees. The Northampton Mayor and Smith College President serve on the board, as was Lyman’s wish. The other board members are volunteers who have an interest in the performing arts, in the continued vitality of the City of Northampton, or who have special expertise related to the Academy’s operations.
