= Mary Silvina Burghardt Du Bois =

American domestic worker (1831–1885)

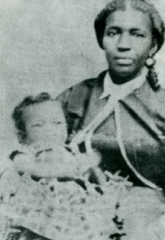
- Du Bois (right) with her son, c. 1870
- Born: Mary Silvina Burghardt; 1831; Great Barrington, Massachusetts, U.S.
- Died: 1885 (aged 53–54); Great Barrington, Massachusetts, U.S.
- Resting place: Mahaiwe Cemetery
- Occupation: servant
- Spouse: Alfred Du Bois
- Children: W. E. B. Du Bois
- Parent(s): Othello Burghardt; Sarah Lampman

Mary Silvina Burghardt Du Bois (1831–1885) was an American domestic worker. She was born a free woman as the granddaughter of a freedman landowner who served in the Continental Army during the American Revolutionary War. She was the mother of the activist and sociologist W. E. B. Du Bois, whose education she supported by working as a servant after her husband left her.

== Biography ==
Du Bois was born Mary Silvina Burghardt in 1831 to Othello Burghardt and Sarah Lampman in Great Barrington, Massachusetts. She had African, Dutch, and English ancestry. Her family were part of a small free black community in Great Barrington that had long been landowners in Massachusetts. Her grandfather was Jack Burghardt. Her great-grandfather, Tom Burghardt, was born in West Africa around 1730 and was enslaved by the Dutch colonist Conraed Burghardt. Her great-grandfather served in the Continental Army during the American Revolutionary War, which may have led to him obtaining his freedom in the late 18th century.

She married Alfred Du Bois on February 5, 1867, in Housatonic, Massachusetts. Her husband was born in Haiti as the illegitimate son of Alexander Du Bois, of Long Cay in The Bahamas, and the grandson of James Du Bois, a Huguenot colonist who fathered several children with enslaved women.

Her husband worked as a barber and itinerant laborer. He served in Company D of the 20th New York Infantry during the American Civil War but later deserted. She gave birth to a son, William Edward Burghardt Du Bois, on February 23, 1868. Alfred reestablished himself in eastern Massachusetts in 1870 and purportedly asked her to join him, but for unclear reasons she declined to follow him.

Du Bois moved, with her son, back to the home of her parents in Great Barrington, where they lived until her son was five years old. They attended First Congregational Church of Great Barrington. Du Bois worked as a servant to support her son and received assistance from her brother and neighbors. Despite living in destitution, she insisted that her son receive a proper education.

Du Bois suffered a stroke in the early 1880s. She died in 1885.
