= 1,4-Diazacycloheptane =

Names
- Preferred IUPAC name 1,4-Diazepane
- Other names: DACH; Homopiperazine

Identifiers
CAS Number	505-66-8
3D model (JSmol)	Interactive image
ChemSpider	61471
ECHA InfoCard	100.007.288
EC Number	208-016-1
PubChem CID	68163
UNII	95CL167W8T
CompTox Dashboard (EPA)	DTXSID1060130
- InChI: InChI=1S/C5H12N2/c1-2-6-4-5-7-3-1/h6-7H,1-5H2 Key: FQUYSHZXSKYCSY-UHFFFAOYSA-N
- SMILES: C1CNCCNC1

Properties
Chemical formula	C_{5}H_{12}N_{2}
Molar mass	100.165 g·mol^{−1}
Appearance	Colorless oily solid
Melting point	42 °C (108 °F; 315 K)
Boiling point	168–170 °C (334–338 °F; 441–443 K)
- Except where otherwise noted, data are given for materials in their standard state (at 25 °C [77 °F], 100 kPa). Infobox references

1,4-Diazacycloheptane is an organic compound with the formula (CH_{2})_{5}(NH)_{2}. This cyclic diamine is a colorless oily liquid that is soluble in polar solvents. It is studied as a chelating ligand. The N–H centers can be replaced with many other groups.

It used in the synthesis of some pharmaceutical drugs, including fasudil, bunazosin, homochlorcyclizine, and homopipramol.

== Related compounds ==
- 1,5-Diazacyclooctane
