= New Britain Public High School Campus =

- U.S. National Register of Historic Places
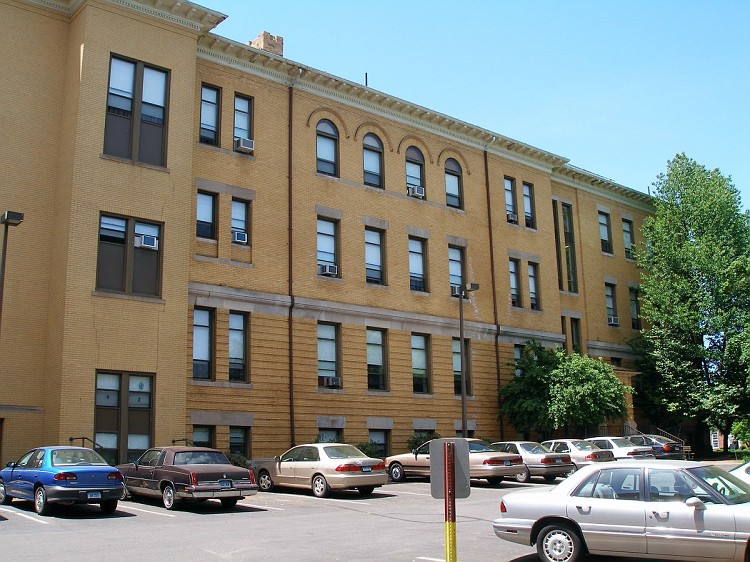
- The former high school in 2007

- Location within Connecticut Location within the United States
- Location: 50 Bassett Street & 161 South Main Street, New Britain, Connecticut
- Coordinates: 41°39′38″N 72°46′48″W
- Built: 1896
- Architectural style: Renaissance Revival architecture; Collegiate Gothic; Moderne
- NRHP reference No.: 15000101
- Added to NRHP: March 23, 2015

The New Britain Public High School Campus is a historic suite of former school buildings at 50 Bassett Street & 161 South Main Street in New Britain, Connecticut. The campus's oldest building, opened in 1896, was one of the first public high schools in Connecticut, and is a good example of Renaissance Revival architecture. The campus was repeated enlarged during the 20th century with the addition of trade and vocational components, and served the city as a high school until the 1970s, when it was converted to housing.

The campus was listed on the National Register of Historic Places in 2015.

== See also ==
- National Register of Historic Places listings in Hartford County, Connecticut
