= Senda Berenson Abbott =

Russian-American basketball pioneer (1868–1954)

Senda Berenson
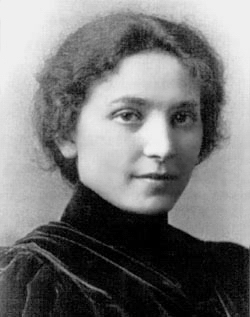
- Born: Senda Valvrojenski; March 19, 1868; Butrimonys, Vilna Governorate, Russian Empire
- Died: February 16, 1954 (aged 85); Santa Barbara, California, U.S.
- Occupation: Teacher
- Known for: Pioneering women's basketball
- Relatives: Bernard Berenson (brother)

Senda Berenson Abbott (March 19, 1868 – February 16, 1954) was a Russian-American figure of women's basketball and the author of the first Basketball Guide for Women (1901–07). She was inducted into the Basketball Hall of Fame as a contributor on July 1, 1985, the International Jewish Sports Hall of Fame in 1987, and the Women's Basketball Hall of Fame in 1999.

Berenson was the first person to introduce and adapt rules for women's basketball to Smith College in 1892, modifying the existing men's rules.

Abbott was the sister of the art historian Bernard Berenson and a great-great-aunt of Berry Berenson and Marisa Berenson.

== Background ==
=== Family ===
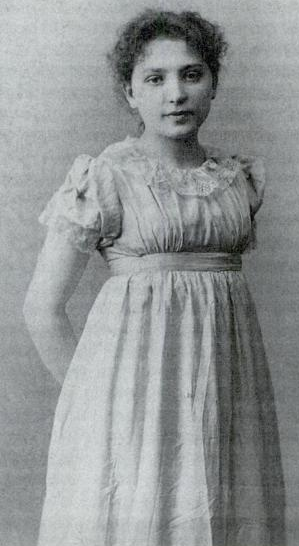
Senda Berenson Abbott as a girl, 1882

Abbott was born as Senda Valvrojenski to Albert Valvrojenski and Judith Valvrojenski (née Mickleshanski) in Butrimonys, Vilnius Governorate, Russian Empire to a Lithuanian Jewish family, who would immigrate to the United States when she was seven years old. Her older brother was Bernard Berenson, and she would later have another younger brother and two younger sisters. Her father Albert grew up following an educational track of classical Jewish learning and contemplated becoming a rabbi. However, he became a practitioner of Haskalah, a European movement which advocated more integration of Jews into secular society. After his home and lumber business were burned to the ground, he lived with his more traditionalist in-laws who pressured him to enroll Bernard with a Hebrew and Aramaic tutor. He decided to move to the United States to raise his family according to his own beliefs, moving alone in 1874 to the West End of Boston. He became a "poor peddler of pots and pans", selling his wares in nearby towns. Albert changed his surname to Berenson soon after his arrival as part of his "Westernization". After months of work, he sent for his family in 1875.

Albert insisted that the family speak only English, stopped attending synagogue, and attempted to sever ties to their Jewish traditions. Despite this, his children did not fully abandon their faith. The family had moved to a section of Boston with almost fifty families from their original neighborhood, some of whom were relatives, so they grew up with religious influences. After her brother attended the Boston Latin School, he moved to Cambridge to prepare to enroll at Harvard. Since she and her brother were close, Senda spent part of her mid-teens in Cambridge.

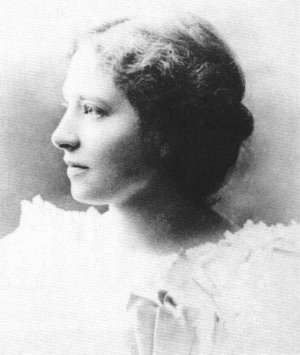
Senda Berenson in 1888

=== Early life ===
Senda did not have much interest in athletics as a child and preferred music, literature, and art. She was "frail and delicate" in her childhood, which interfered with her schooling. She was partially home-schooled by her father and attended Boston Latin Academy (then known as Girl's Latin School), but did not graduate. She briefly attended the Boston Conservatory of Music, but health issues forced her to leave the school. She had tried painting and the piano, but her health limited both; she was unable to keep up the practice. Senda moved out of the house and began a relationship with a man named David. However, Bernard was not yet self-sufficient, and Senda would send him money on a regular basis. She ended up moving back home, for what were "probably economic reasons". The relationship with David was serious enough to prompt a proposal of marriage, but Senda declined and they amicably ended their relationship near the end of 1888.

Her health continued to deteriorate, forcing her to give up her piano lessons at the Conservatory due to her back problems. She slowed her writing to her brother, who worried about her health and urged her to take a summer in the country. That refreshed her temporarily and she re-enrolled at the Conservatory, but she was unable to keep it up, and fell into a long depression that extended into 1890.

=== Boston Normal School of Gymnastics ===
Mary Hemenway was a philanthropist in Boston who founded the Boston Normal School of Cooking. The following year, she provided instruction to one hundred Boston school teachers in a system of gymnastics education known as the Swedish system. At the time, the predominant form of physical education was a German style of gymnastics, with an emphasis on strength training and competitiveness. In 1889, Hemenway funded and Homans arranged a conference on physical training, which had national influence on the course of physical education in schools. The conference "is considered by most historians to be pivotal in the development of American physical education". In that same year, Hemenway created the Boston Normal School of Gymnastics. Later, the school would become Department of Hygiene and Physical Education at Wellesley College.

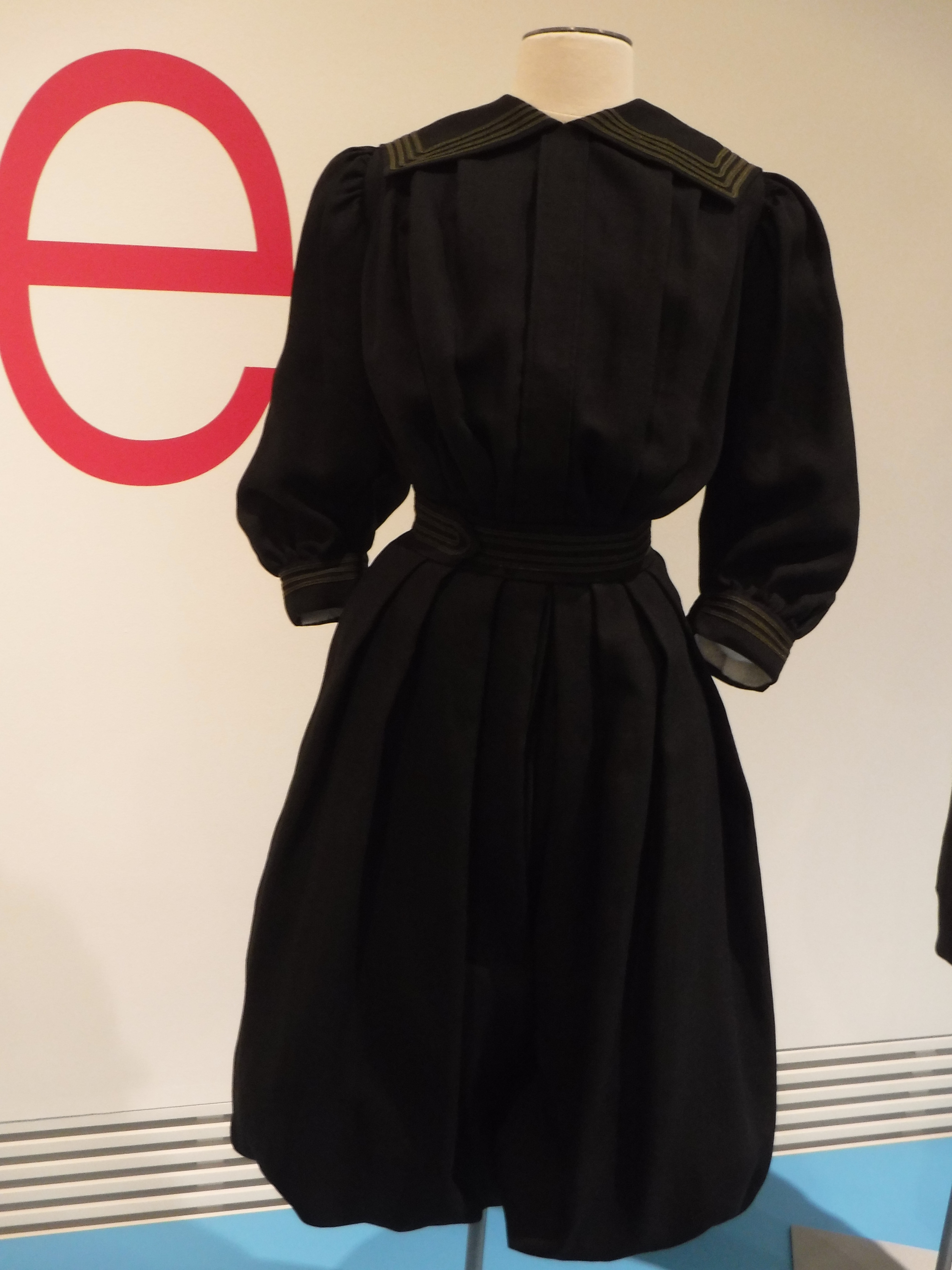
Wool serge gymnasium suit with blouse, sailor collar and bloomer-style trousers, ca. 1915

Berenson learned about the School of Gymnastics from a friend and decided to enroll to improve her physical condition. However, the entrance requirements included high school graduation or equivalent, and Berenson hadn't graduated. In addition, the entrants were expected to be in satisfactory physical condition, which was not Berenson's case. Berenson met with Homans, and Homans took a liking to her and felt that her physical condition could be improved and that the result might serve as a testament to the school's approach. Homans decided to admit Berenson. The school offered a two-tier teacher training course and a one-year certificate course; Berenson enrolled in the one-year program.

Berenson's start was inauspicious. Years later she would exclaim "how I hated that school for the first few months!". She wasn't interested in the gymnastics work, as the exercises made her "ache all over". Berenson felt by just standing erect for five minutes forced her to lie down, and she found she had to study lying on her back. She decided to give the exercises a "fair trial", and she saw improvement in three months. By the end of the year, she was doing the prescribed two hours a day of exercise and felt much better. Her brother was disappointed to hear that she had not returned to the Conservatory but did not fully comprehend how much she had improved at the gymnastics school. Berenson decided to enroll at the school for a second year.

=== Smith College—initial hiring ===
Berenson's condition improved so markedly that Homans sent her to the elementary school in Andover to teach the headmaster and faculty about the Swedish theory of gymnastics. Berenson made twice-weekly visits to the school. This first attempt at teaching proved so successful that, when Homans learned of a temporary opening due to the illness of a teacher at Smith College, she recommended that Berenson consider it, even though she had not completed her second year. Berenson would later be described as a "missionary" referring to her strong support for the inclusion of physical education in the lives of the students. This characterization was intriguing for two reasons:

1. less than two years earlier, her physical condition would not even permit her to play the piano for long stretches
2. her position was expected to be temporary, making it all that more unusual that she would push her beliefs so forcefully.

Perhaps her own improvement, which she attributed to the Swedish gymnastics, led her to the belief that her experience could be transferred to others. She promoted physical education outside of Smith College as well. The local high school, Northampton High School, experimented with the Swedish system of gymnastics under her direction in 1892. She also introduced Swedish exercise and games such as basketball to the inmates at the Northampton State Hospital.

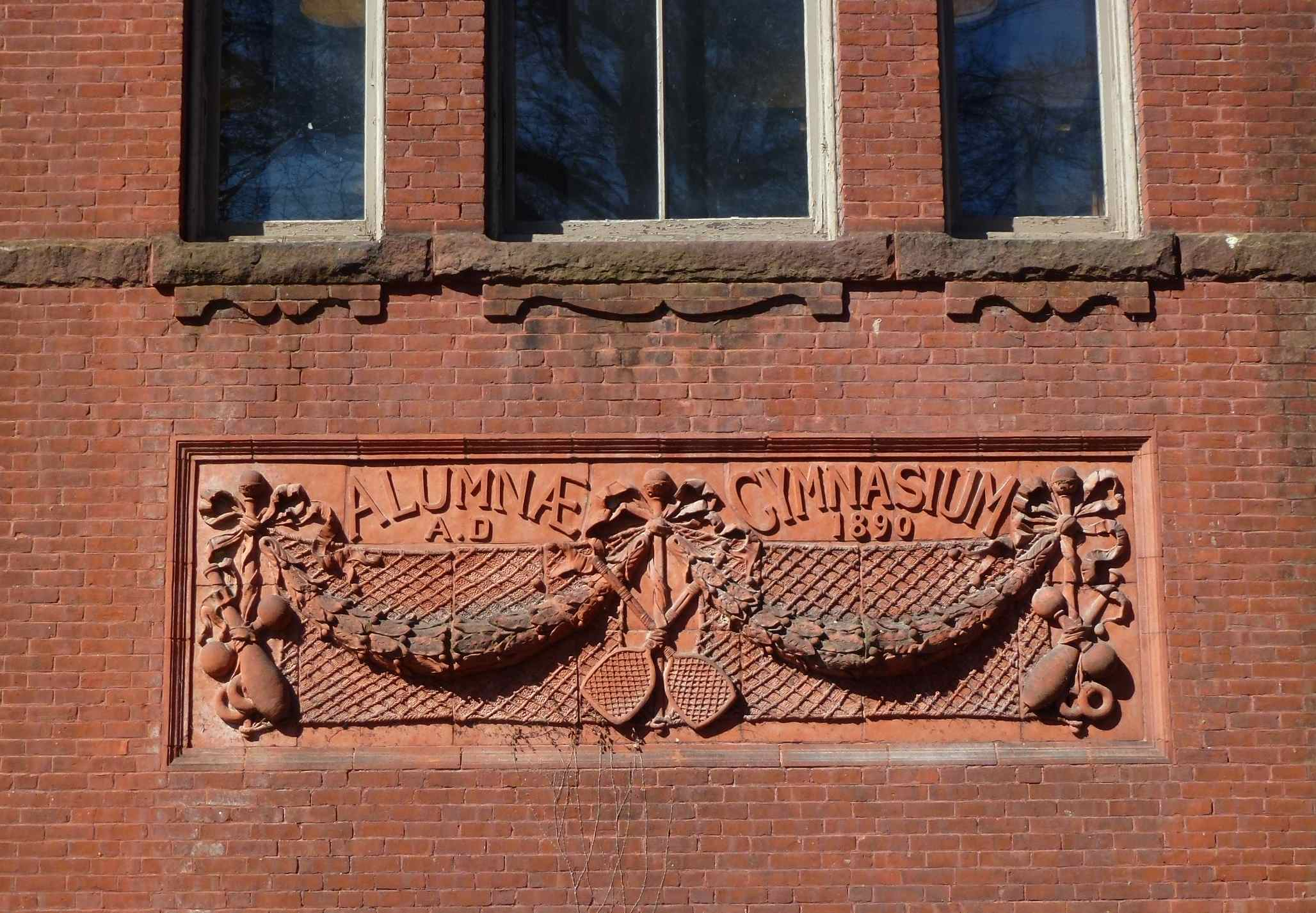
Exterior of Alumnae Gymnasium at Smith College. The upper windows look into the gymnasium where the first women's basketball games were played in 1892

Berenson arrived at a school with well-equipped facilities. The school had recently completed the Alumnae Gymnasium in 1890, which provided some of the best facilities in the country for college women. Although the physical facilities were in fine shape, the notion that women might engage in physical exercise, much less be required to do so, was not then well-established. The prevailing atmosphere did not support the notion that women should engage in physical activity. Berenson would write, in 1894,

Until recent years, the so-called ideal woman was a small waisted, small footed, small brained damsel, who prided herself on her delicate health, who thought fainting interesting, and hysterics fascinating.

Berenson sought to establish mandatory physical education in this atmosphere. She spent considerable time presenting her position to the faculty and administration. One meeting began with only one faculty member in agreement, but by the meeting's end, she had persuaded the faculty to support a mandatory second year of physical education. She had six classes each day filled with "enthusiastic girls", but she realized at the end of term that many students had never come to class. She instituted roll call the following year.

== Women's basketball origins ==
Known as the Mother of Women's Basketball, Berenson became the first woman enshrined in the Basketball Hall of Fame in 1985.

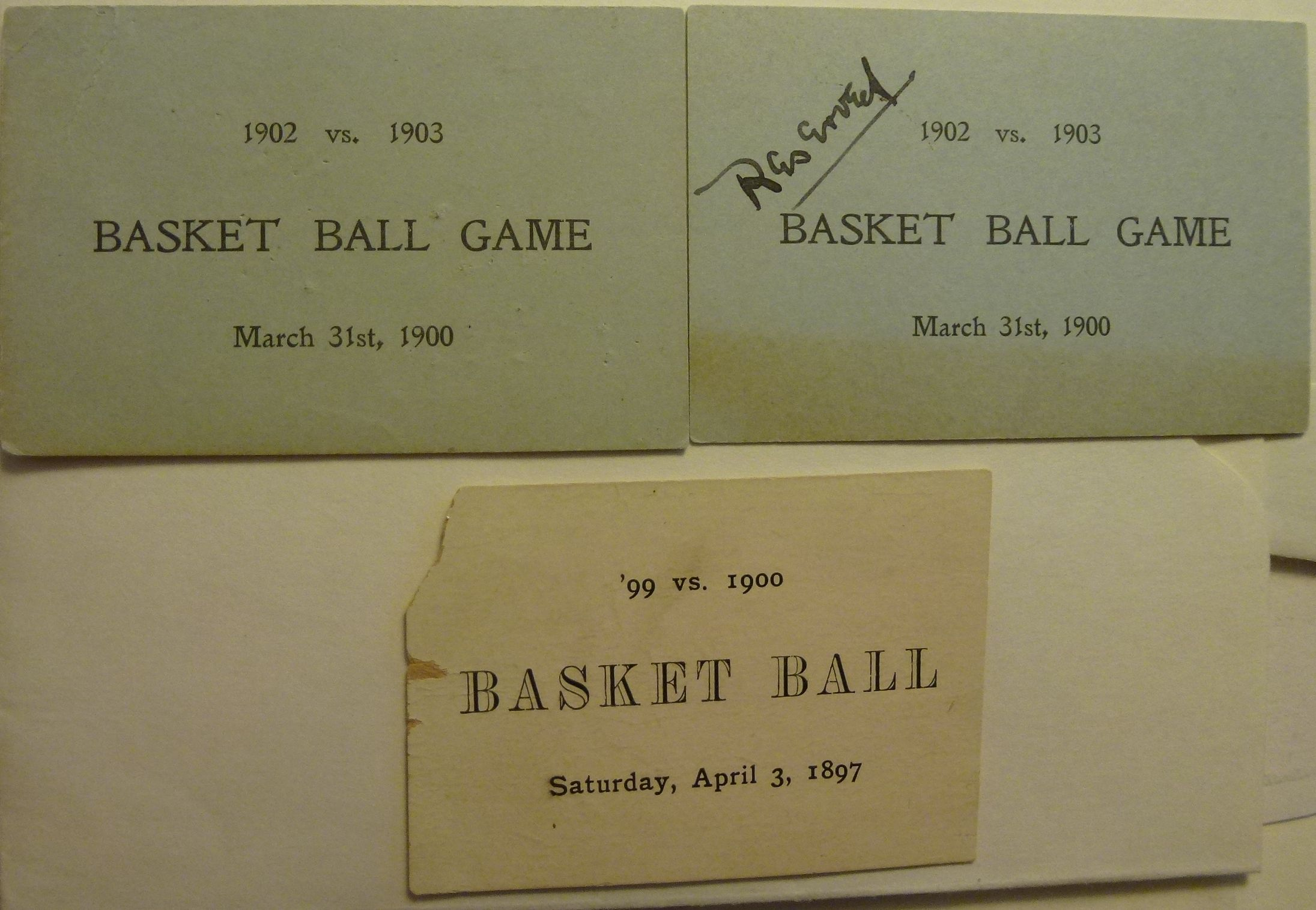
College basketball tickets, issued for interclass women's basketball games in 1897 and 1900.

In 1892, after Berenson realized that the gymnastic exercises were not as popular as she had originally thought, she looked for alternatives. She read about the new game of basketball, invented by James Naismith, in the YMCA publication Physical Education. Group games were "unheard of" at Smith, but she felt this would be an interesting experiment. Other attempts at teaching games had not succeeded, in part because the women of that time had no experience with team play. Initial games were played in class in the spring of 1892. The exact date of the first informal game is not known, but one student wrote to her mother on March 6, 1892, describing a new game they were playing, in which the object was to put a ball into your opponent's basket, as "great fun". Instead of the peach baskets used in the first men's game, the goals in the first women's game were fashioned from waste baskets.

The response was so positive that Berenson scheduled a game between the freshman and sophomore classes. That game, played March 22, 1893, was also played with Naismith rules. The players wore bloomers, and no men were admitted to the event. The players all wore blue uniforms, adorned by an armband with the color associated with their class. The spectators wore the class colors: green for the sophomore class of 1895, and lavender for the freshman class of 1896. When Berenson tossed the ball between the two opposing centers, she struck the outstretched arm of the freshman team's center, dislocating her shoulder. The start of this game was delayed while they attended to the distressed player and arranged for a substitute. The New York Herald reported five days later that "[i]n spite of the fact that the sophomore captain was disabled at the beginning of the game, the score was 5-4 in favor of the sophomores after a close contest of two 15-minute halves."

Despite her unflagging efforts to support physical education for young women, Berenson did not encourage inter-scholastic games. In her words, "We should encourage the instinct of play, not competition." This set a precedent for the non-participation in interscholastic events which would be followed for many years. While competition with other schools was discouraged, she did promote competition among classes and established a tradition of interclass games. The atmosphere at the games was noisy, but enthusiasm was expressed by singing. Shouting would result in the discontinuance of the game.

Berenson had introduced the game as an experiment, so she sought to determine how the students reacted to the game. She polled her students, and all but one felt they had improved in many areas, including "endurance, lung capacity, alertness, courage, [and] toughness". One student reported that the game brought her "health, wealth and happiness", the second of which was attributed to lower doctor bills. The early game followed different rules than are followed today, as evidenced by a play dreamed up by one of the freshmen on the first teams:

She threw a low ball against the wall at such an angle that it bounded back into the hands of one of her own players who was watching for it.

=== Modifying the rules ===
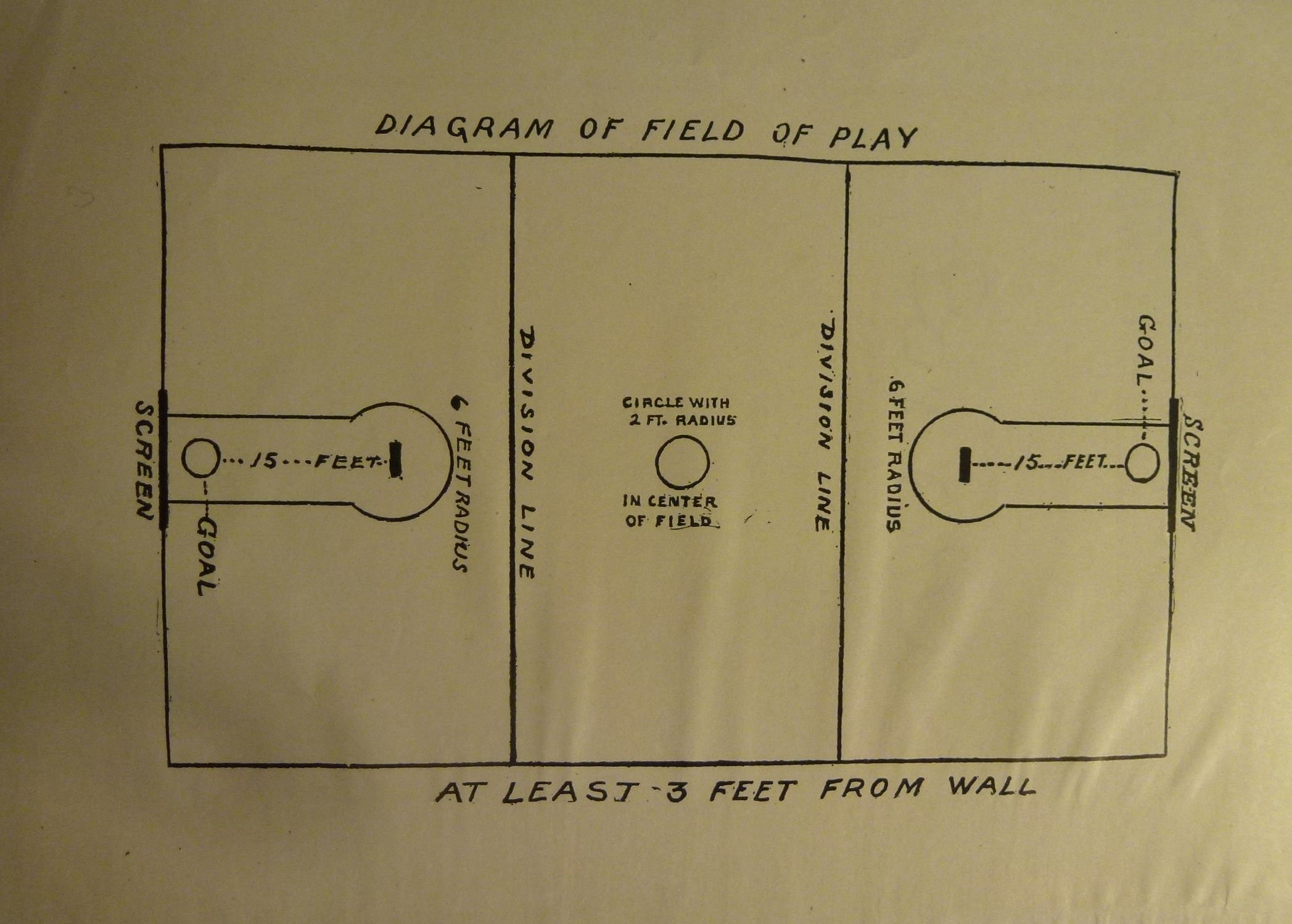
This is a diagram of the basketball court in use for women's basketball consistent with rules adopted in 1899.

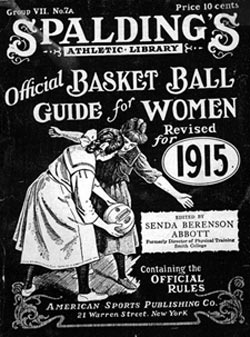
The 1915 edition of the rules as edited by Berenson

Berenson was pleased with the reception to the game but felt some changes were needed. She thought the game had a "tendency to roughness", so she sat down with her class to discuss how to modify the rules. She divided the court into three regions and prohibited players from leaving their assigned region. Players could not dribble more than three times, hold the ball for more than three seconds, or snatch the ball from an opponent.

The Division of Girls' and Women's Sports of the American Association for Health, Physical Education and Recreation felt the need for a written set of rules specifically applicable to the women's game and asked Berenson to undertake a publication outlining the rules. Berenson formalized her rules into a set of official rules – Line Basketball or Basket Ball for Women, often referred to as simply "Basket Ball for Women." In 1901, the Spalding Library published the rules with Berenson as editor, and would continue to publish them for eighteen years. Berenson organized the United States Basket Ball Committee in 1905, where she served as chairman until 1917. The rules would remain in use with only minor modification until the 1960s.

=== Views on basketball ===
Berenson viewed the sport as "a complete educational experience" and did not allow players to play if they failed in subjects; the importance of education was paramount. Players were required to wear their hair in braids or ribbons to maintain a tidy appearance. In addition to physical development, she felt the game helped players develop intellectually and emotionally via decision making and the following of the rules. She encouraged her students to suggest alternative rules or different methods of play to improve the game. She encouraged responsibility by naming captains, who helped serve as coaches for the players.

== Smith College — subsequent years ==
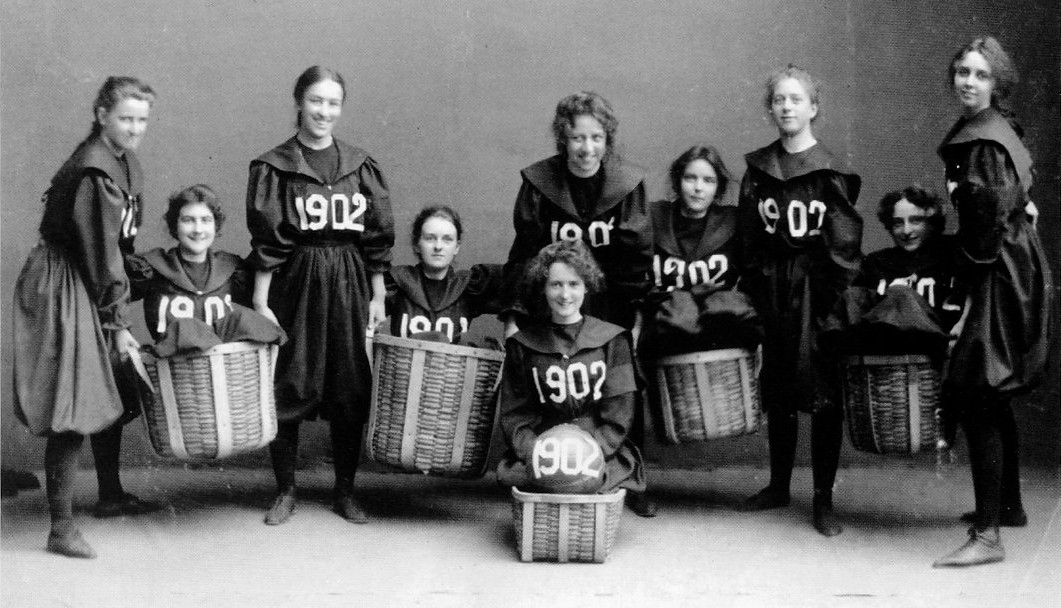
Smith class of 1902 basketball team

At the end of her first year at Smith, Berenson was invited to return in fall when her original, temporary position was made permanent. With the expectation of a future income, plus a financial contribution from her brother Bernard, whom she had not seen for several years, she decided to spend the summer in Europe to visit him. When Berenson returned, she continued to develop her gymnastics program as the Instructor in Gymnastics but pursued other interests with the aid of a part-time assistant. She had visited a number of art galleries during her summer with Bernard, and she keep up her interest in art. She corresponded with Bernard regularly, who was happy to hear of her interest in art. He was not yet convinced that her career in gymnastics was wise, hoping that she would abandon it for a career in art. Berenson wrote often about art, partly to show Bernard she could keep up with him intellectually. She did not emphasize her work, although she did send him a picture of herself in her gymnastics outfit. She was also involved in campus theater, starting with play reading and continuing with appearances in several plays. She played the lead role in a William Dean Howells play Unexpected Guest, which was so well-received, they performed it a second time.

Berenson attended the Royal Central Institute of Gymnastic in Stockholm and organized the Gymnastics and Field Association at Smith in 1893. After her return from Stockholm, she started a folk dance program at Smith and introduced fencing to the school in 1895. In 1901, she introduced field hockey with the help of Lady Constance Applebee of England. She later also adapted volleyball for women.

In 1911, she married a professor of English at Smith, Herbert Vaughan Abbott. Soon afterward, Berenson resigned from her position, although she continued her interest in sport by serving as the Director of Physical Education at the Mary A. Burham School located in Northampton, Massachusetts. Senda Berenson died in Santa Barbara, California, on February 16, 1954.

== See also ==
- Timeline of women's basketball history
