= Coordination sphere =

All ligands directly bound to the central metal atom of a chemical complex

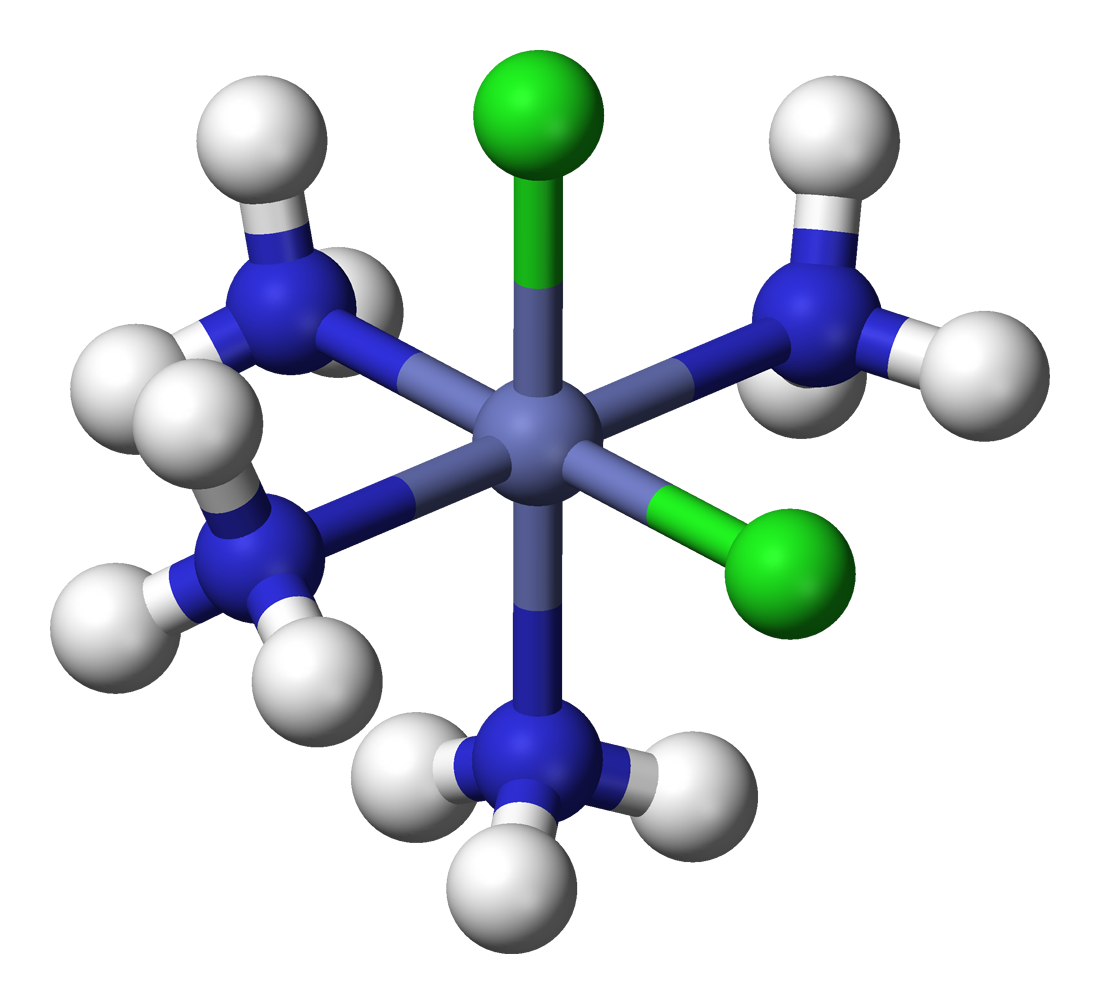
cis-[CoCl_{2}(NH_{3})_{4}]^{+} The NH_{3} and Cl groups form a coordination sphere around the central cobalt ion.

In coordination chemistry, the first coordination sphere refers to the array of molecules and ions (the ligands) directly attached to the central metal atom. The second coordination sphere consists of molecules and ions that attached in various ways to the first coordination sphere.

== First coordination sphere ==
The first coordination sphere refers to the molecules that are attached directly to the metal. The interactions between the first and second coordination spheres usually involve hydrogen-bonding. For charged complexes, ion pairing is important.

Hexamminecobalt(III) chloride is a salt of a coordination complex wherein six ammonia ("ammine") ligands occupy the first coordination sphere of the ion Co^{3+}.

In hexamminecobalt(III) chloride ([Co(NH_{3})_{6}]Cl_{3}), the cobalt cation plus the 6 ammonia ligands comprise the first coordination sphere. The coordination sphere of this ion thus consists of a central MN_{6} core "decorated" by 18 N−H bonds that radiate outwards.

== Second coordination sphere ==
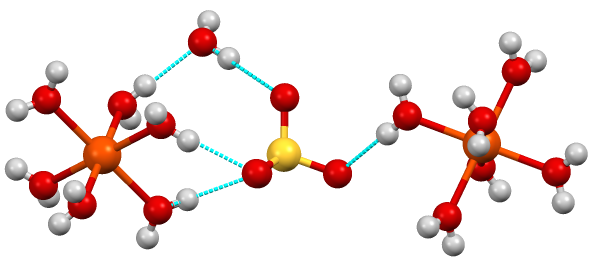
In crystalline FeSO_{4}^{.}7H_{2}O, the first coordination sphere of Fe^{2+} consists of six water ligands. The second coordination sphere consists of a water of crystallization and sulfate, which interact with the [Fe(H_{2}O)_{6}]^{2+} centers.

Metal ions can be described as consisting of series of two concentric coordination spheres, the first and second. More distant from the second coordination sphere, the solvent molecules behave more like "bulk solvent." Simulation of the second coordination sphere is of interest in computational chemistry. The second coordination sphere can consist of ions (especially in charged complexes), molecules (especially those that hydrogen bond to ligands in the first coordination sphere) and portions of a ligand backbone. Compared to the first coordination sphere, the second coordination sphere has a less direct influence on the reactivity and chemical properties of the metal complex. Nonetheless the second coordination sphere is relevant to understanding reactions of the metal complex, including the mechanisms of ligand exchange and catalysis.

=== Role in catalysis ===
Mechanisms of metalloproteins often invoke modulation of the second coordination sphere by the protein.

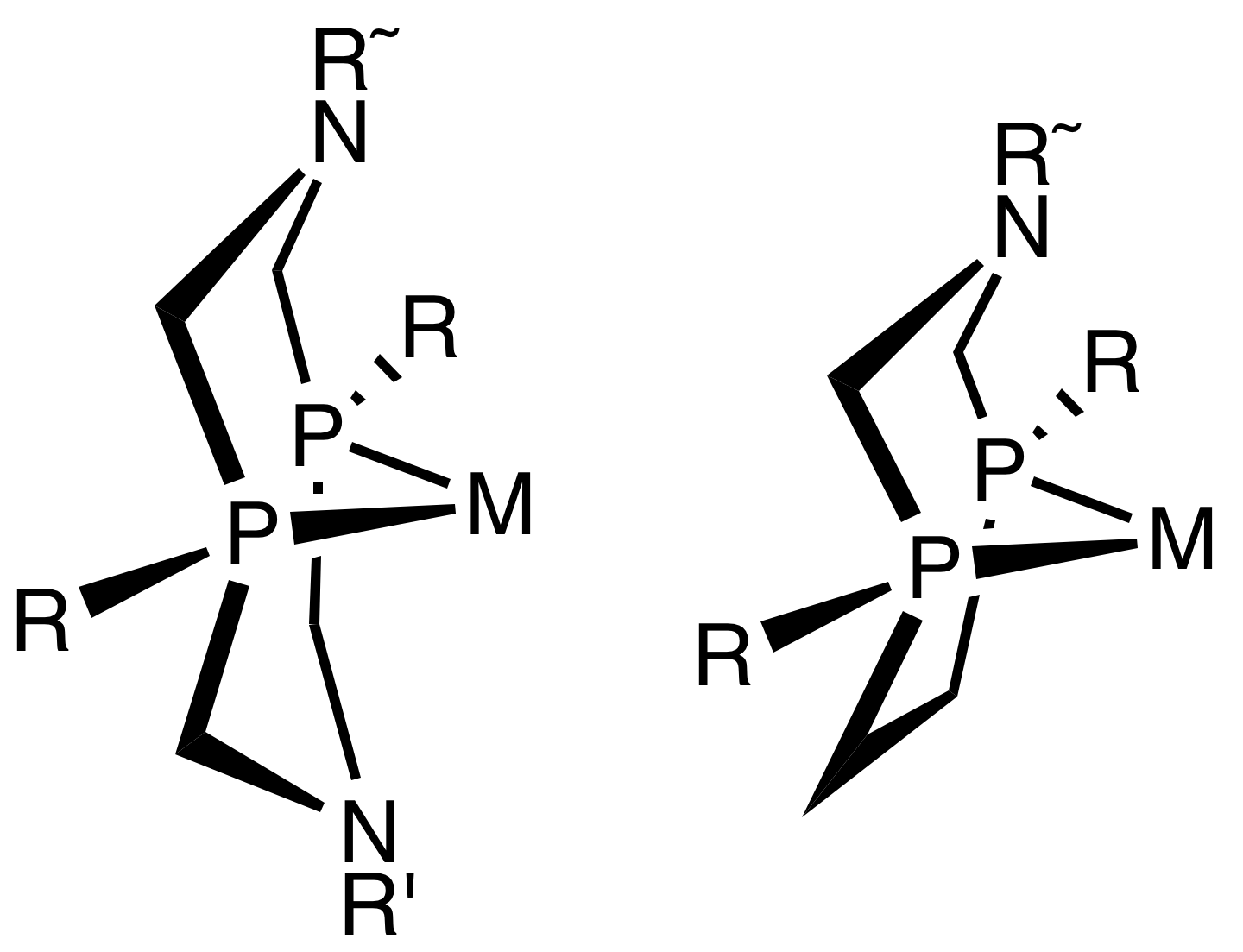
In metal complexes of 1,5-diaza-3,7-diphosphacyclooctanes and related ligands, amine groups occupy the second coordination sphere.

=== Role in mechanistic inorganic chemistry ===
The rates at which ligands exchange between the first and the second coordination sphere is the first step in ligand substitution reactions. In associative ligand substitution, the entering nucleophile resides in the second coordination sphere. These effects are relevant to practical applications such as contrast agents used in MRI.

The energetics of inner sphere electron transfer reactions are discussed in terms of second coordination sphere. Some proton coupled electron transfer reactions involve atom transfer between the second coordination spheres of the reactants:

[Fe*(H_{2}O)_{6}]^{3+} + [Fe(H_{2}O)_{5}(OH)]^{2+} → [Fe(H_{2}O)_{6}]^{3+} + [Fe*(H_{2}O)_{5}(OH)]^{2+}

=== Role in spectroscopy ===
Solvent effects on colors and stability are often attributable to changes in the second coordination sphere. Such effects can be pronounced in complexes where the ligands in the first coordination sphere are strong hydrogen-bond donors and acceptors, e.g. respectively [Co(NH_{3})_{6}]^{3+} and [Fe(CN)_{6}]^{3−}. Crown-ethers bind to polyamine complexes through their second coordination sphere. Polyammonium cations bind to the nitrogen centres of cyanometallates.

=== Role in supramolecular chemistry ===
Macrocyclic molecules such as cyclodextrins act often as the second coordination sphere for metal complexes.

== See also ==
- Coordination number
- Ligand cone angle
- Coordination geometry
