= 1,5-Diaza-3,7-diphosphacyclooctanes =

Class of chemical compounds

P2N2 ligand structure

1,5-Diaza-3,7-diphosphacyclooctanes are organophosphorus compounds with the formula [R'NCH_{2}P(R)CH_{2}]_{2}, often abbreviated P^{R}_{2}N^{R'}_{2}. They are air-sensitive white solids that are soluble in organic solvents. The ligands exist as meso and d,l-diastereomers, but only the meso forms function as bidentate ligands.

Some metal-P^{R}_{2}N^{R'}_{2} complexes catalyze the hydrogen evolution reaction as well as the oxidation of hydrogen (H_{2}). The catalytic mechanism involves the interaction of substrate with the amines in the second coordination sphere.

== Synthesis and reactions ==
The ligands are prepared by the condensation of a primary phosphine, formaldehyde, and a primary amine:

2 RPH_{2} + 4 CH_{2}O + 2 RNH_{2} → [RNCH_{2}P(R')CH_{2}]_{2} + 4 H_{2}O

Diazadiphosphacyclooctanes function as chelating diphosphine ligands. Typical nickel complexes contain two such ligands are give the formula [Ni(P^{R}_{2}N^{R'}_{2})_{2}]^{2+}.

Cationic complexes of these P_{2}N_{2} and related ligands often exhibit enhanced reactivity toward H_{2}. These complexes serve as electrocatalysts for H_{2} evolution.

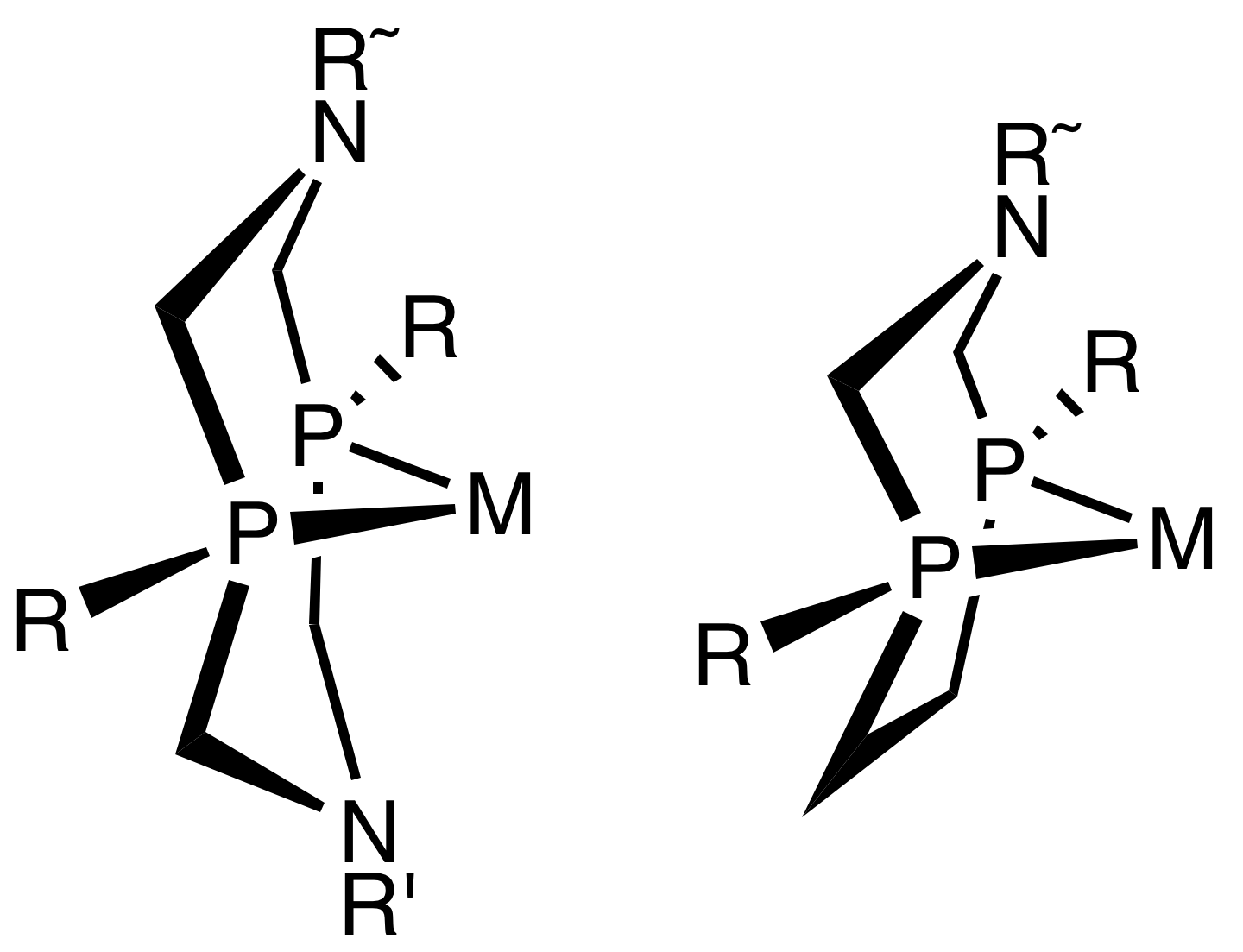
Conformation of chelate rings in P2N2-M and P2N-M complexes

== Related ligands ==
Azadiphosphacycloheptanes are a related family of diphosphines, but containing only one amine. They are prepared by condensation of 1,2-bis(phenylphosphino)ethane, formaldehyde, and a primary amine. From the meso-isomer, typical nickel complexes contain two such ligands, i.e. [Ni(P^{R}_{2}NR')_{2}]^{2+}. When bound to metals, these ligands adopt a conformation similar to that of 1,4-diazacycloheptanes. Acyclic phosphine-amine ligands have the formula (R_{2}PCH_{2})NR'.
