= Homopipramol =

Medication

Clinical data
- ATC code: none

Identifiers
- IUPAC name: 4-(3-(5H-Dibenz(b,f)azepin-5-yl)propyl)hexahydro-1H-1,4-diazepine-1-ethanol
- CAS Number: 35142-68-8 60563-10-2 (fumarate)
- PubChem CID: 3042817
- ChemSpider: 2305937
- UNII: 09YNW8E5CT
- ChEMBL: ChEMBL2104868
- CompTox Dashboard (EPA): DTXSID80865750

Chemical and physical data
- Formula: C_{24}H_{31}N_{3}O
- Molar mass: 377.532 g·mol^{−1}
- 3D model (JSmol): Interactive image
- SMILES: OCCN1CCCN(CCCN2C3=CC=CC=C3C=CC3=CC=CC=C23)CC1
- InChI: InChI=1S/C24H31N3O/c28-20-19-26-14-5-13-25(17-18-26)15-6-16-27-23-9-3-1-7-21(23)11-12-22-8-2-4-10-24(22)27/h1-4,7-12,28H,5-6,13-20H2; Key:AXJPNVUUDXTSOL-UHFFFAOYSA-N

Homopipramol is a tricyclic antidepressant and antipsychotic which was never marketed.

== See also ==
- Opipramol
