= Daryle H. Busch =

American chemist (1928–2021)

Daryle Hadley Busch (March 30, 1928 – May 19, 2021) was an American inorganic chemist.

A native of Carterville, Illinois, born in 1928, Busch attended Southern Illinois University and earned a master's, and doctorate in chemistry from the University of Illinois. Upon graduation, he began teaching at the Ohio State University. Busch was awarded a Guggenheim fellowship in 1981. He retired from OSU in 1988, a year after he had been appointed to a presidential professorship. Busch then joined the University of Kansas faculty as Roy A. Roberts Distinguished Professor of Chemistry. He was president of the American Chemical Society in 2000.
