= Coolidge House =

Coolidge House may refer to:

- Coolidge House (Helena-West Helena, Arkansas)
- Coolidge Homestead, Plymouth Notch, Vermont
- Calvin Coolidge House, Northampton, Massachusetts
- Josiah Coolidge House, Cambridge, Massachusetts

== See also ==
- Wentworth-Coolidge Mansion, Portsmouth, New Hampshire
- Coolidge-Rising House, Spokane, Washington
