= John Coolidge (disambiguation) =

John Coolidge was an American businessman.

John Coolidge may also refer to:

- John Calvin Coolidge Sr., an American politician
- John Gardner Coolidge, an American diplomat
