= Plymouth, Vermont =

- Town
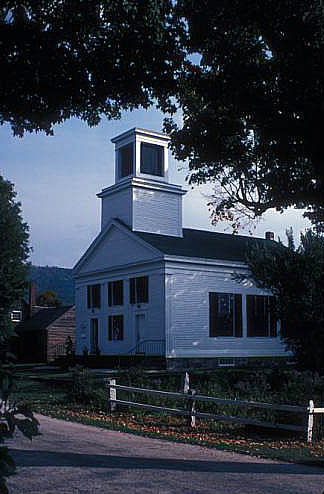
- Union Christian Church (1840) in the Plymouth Historic District

- Logo

- Location in Windsor County and the state of Vermont.
- Coordinates: 43°30′24″N 72°43′08″W
- Country: United States
- State: Vermont
- County: Windsor
- Communities: Plymouth; Plymouth Kingdom; Plymouth Union; Tyson

Area
  - Total: 48.7 sq mi (126.1 km^{2})
  - Land: 48.1 sq mi (124.6 km^{2})
  - Water: 0.54 sq mi (1.4 km^{2})
- Elevation: 1,532 ft (467 m)

Population (2020)
  - Total: 641
  - Density: 13.3/sq mi (5.14/km^{2})
- Time zone: UTC-5 (Eastern (EST))
  - Summer (DST): UTC-4 (EDT)
- ZIP Codes: 05056 (Plymouth); 05035 (Bridgewater Corners); 05149 (Ludlow)
- Area code: 802
- FIPS code: 50-56050
- GNIS feature ID: 1462176
- Website: www.plymouthvt.org

Plymouth is a town in Windsor County, Vermont, United States. The population was 641 at the 2020 census. Calvin Coolidge, the 30th president of the United States, was born and raised in Plymouth and is buried there in the Plymouth Notch cemetery. The State of Vermont Division for Historic Preservation owns and maintains the Coolidge Homestead and the village of Plymouth Notch.

== Geography ==
According to the United States Census Bureau, the town has a total area of 48.7 square miles (126.1 km^{2}), of which 48.1 square miles (124.6 km^{2}) is land and 0.54 square miles (1.4 km^{2}), or 1.15%, is water.

== History ==
Plymouth was called Saltash before its name was changed in 1797.

The old Coolidge store, run by John Calvin Coolidge, Sr., the president's father, housed the post office in the 1920s. John Coolidge's wife, Carrie, served as postmaster 1903–1917. Coolidge's father also founded Plymouth Cheese, which continues to produce artisan cheese today.

Plymouth was one of thirteen Vermont towns isolated by flooding caused by Hurricane Irene in 2011.

== Demographics ==
Historical population
Census	Pop.	Note	%±
1790	106		—
1800	497		368.9%
1810	834		67.8%
1820	1,112		33.3%
1830	1,237		11.2%
1840	1,417		14.6%
1850	1,226		−13.5%
1860	1,252		2.1%
1870	1,285		2.6%
1880	1,075		−16.3%
1890	755		−29.8%
1900	646		−14.4%
1910	482		−25.4%
1920	449		−6.8%
1930	331		−26.3%
1940	432		30.5%
1950	348		−19.4%
1960	308		−11.5%
1970	283		−8.1%
1980	405		43.1%
1990	440		8.6%
2000	555		26.1%
2010	619		11.5%
2020	641		3.6%
U.S. Decennial Census

As of the census of 2000, there were 555 people, 251 households, and 168 families residing in the town. The population density was 11.5 people per square mile (4.4/km^{2}). There were 773 housing units at an average density of 16.0 per square mile (6.2/km^{2}). The racial makeup of the town was 99.28% White, 0.36% African American, and 0.36% from two or more races.

There were 251 households, out of which 23.5% had children under the age of 18 living with them, 55.8% were married couples living together, 5.2% had a female householder with no husband present, and 32.7% were non-families. 27.1% of all households were made up of individuals, and 10.0% had someone living alone who was 65 years of age or older. The average household size was 2.21 and the average family size was 2.59.

In the town, the population was spread out, with 18.0% under the age of 18, 2.9% from 18 to 24, 26.3% from 25 to 44, 33.2% from 45 to 64, and 19.6% who were 65 years of age or older. The median age was 47 years. For every 100 females, there were 110.2 males. For every 100 females age 18 and over, there were 107.8 males.

The median income for a household in the town was $43,438, and the median income for a family was $46,667. Males had a median income of $29,583 versus $27,917 for females. The per capita income for the town was $25,272. About 3.5% of families and 5.4% of the population were below the poverty line, including 3.7% of those under age 18 and 8.7% of those age 65 or over.

== Notable residents ==
- Calvin Coolidge, 30th president of the United States
- Calvin Galusha Coolidge, Vermont state legislator, grandfather of Calvin Coolidge
- John Calvin Coolidge Sr., Vermont state legislator, father of Calvin Coolidge
- Esther Sumner Damon, last widow of an American Revolutionary War veteran to receive a pension
- Ernest E. Moore, Speaker of the Vermont House of Representatives
- Henry M. Pollard, US Congressman from Missouri
- Achsa W. Sprague, spiritualist and medium
- Hiland Orlando Stickney, college football player and coach
- William W. Stickney, governor of Vermont
- George Washington Putnam, Wisconsin state legislator
- Julius A. Willcox, associate justice of the Vermont Supreme Court
