= John Coolidge =

American businessman (1906–2000)

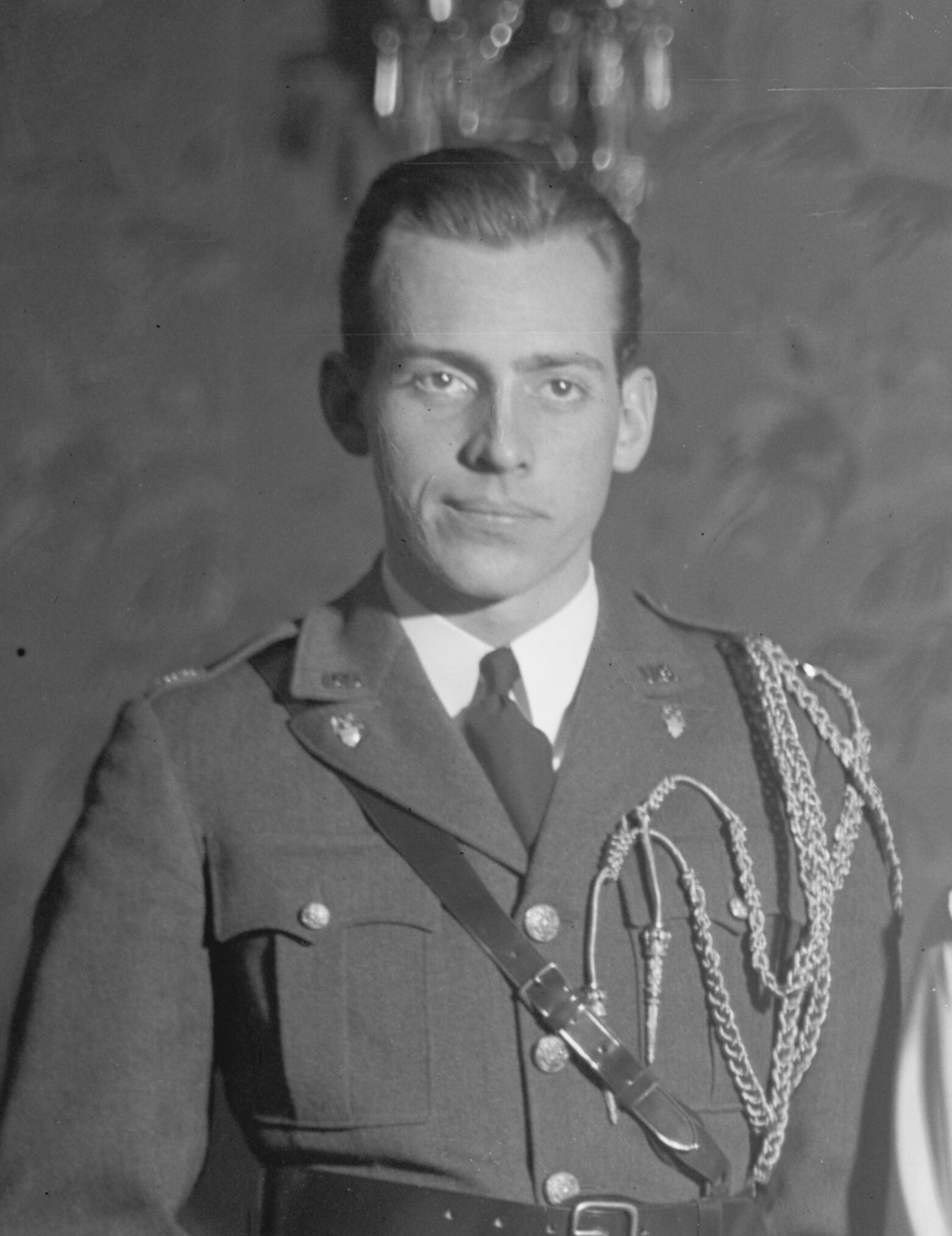
- Coolidge c. 1930
- Born: September 7, 1906; Northampton, Massachusetts, U.S.
- Died: May 31, 2000 (aged 93); Lebanon, New Hampshire, U.S.
- Burial place: Plymouth Notch Cemetery, Plymouth, Vermont, U.S.
- Education: Amherst College
- Occupations: Railroad executive, businessman, entrepreneur
- Political party: Republican
- Spouse: Florence Trumbull (m. 1929; died 1998)
- Children: 2
- Parents: Calvin Coolidge; Grace Goodhue

John Coolidge (September 7, 1906 – May 31, 2000) was an American executive, businessman, and entrepreneur with the New York, New Haven and Hartford Railroad. He was the first son of Calvin Coolidge, the 30th president of the United States (1923–1929) and Grace Coolidge, the First Lady of the United States from 1923 to 1929.

== Early life ==
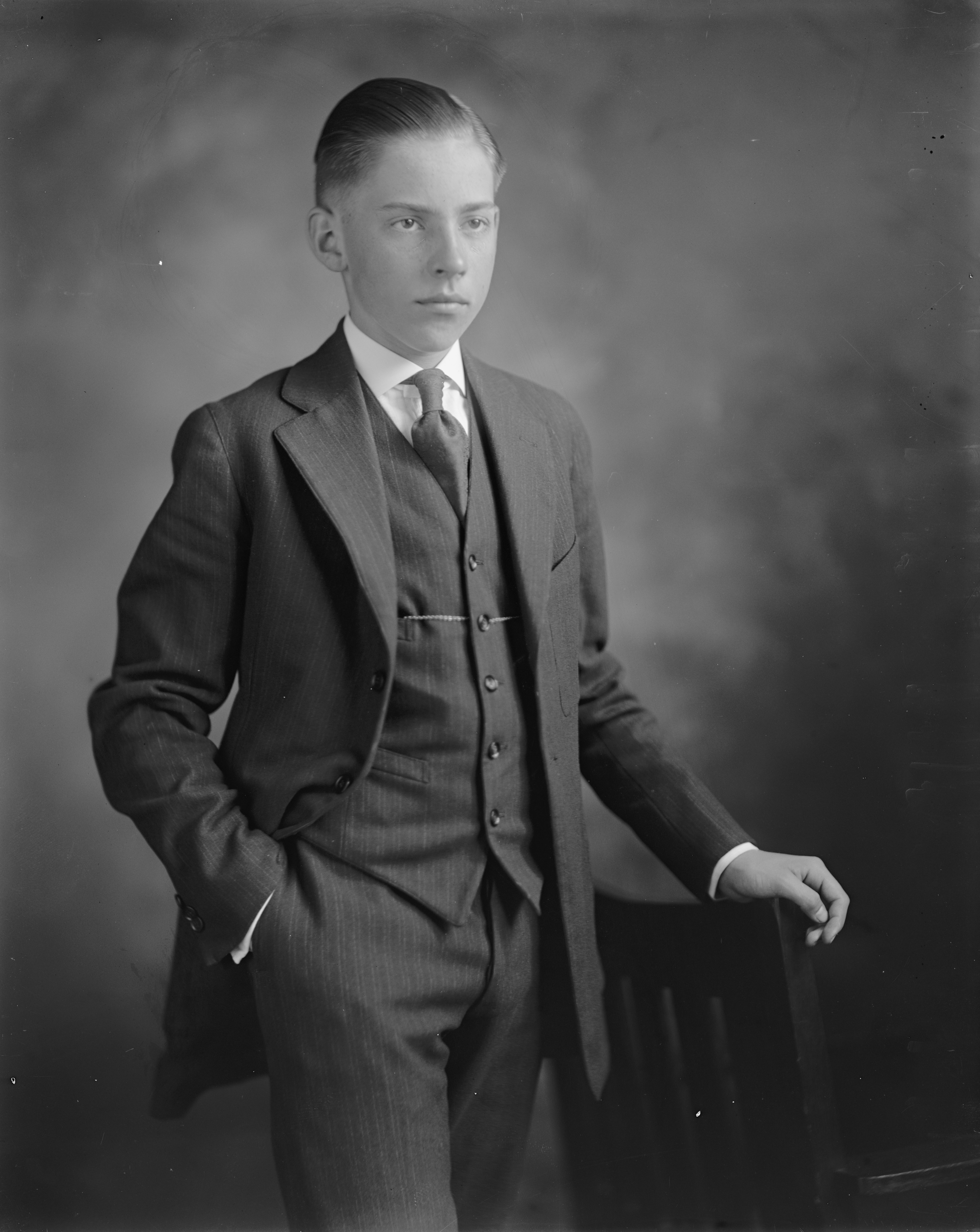
Photograph of Coolidge in his youth

John Coolidge was born in Northampton, Massachusetts, on September 7, 1906. He was the elder of the two children of Calvin Coolidge (1872–1933) and Grace Anna Goodhue (1879–1957). In his autobiography, Calvin Coolidge recorded his impressions of the birth of his first son: "The fragrance of the clematis which covered the bay window filled the room like a benediction where the mother lay with her baby. It was all very wonderful to us." On July 7, 1924, his younger brother, Calvin Jr., died from blood poisoning due to a blister on his foot.

Coolidge attended Mercersburg Academy in Mercersburg, Pennsylvania, and graduated in 1924. He then enrolled at Amherst College, his father's alma mater.

== Career ==
Coolidge was an executive with the New York, New Haven and Hartford Railroad. He served as president of the Connecticut Manifold Forms Company until 1960, when he reopened the Plymouth Cheese Corporation in Plymouth, Vermont at the historic village.

He helped start the Coolidge Foundation and his gifts of buildings, land, and artifacts were instrumental in creating the President Calvin Coolidge State Historic Site. Into his 80s, Coolidge was seen shuttling back and forth from his home near the historic site to collect his mail at the old post office located on the site. He was reportedly a charming and excited talker who would answer visitors' questions about his father or his family, and who would, on occasion, give a personal interview.

== Personal life ==
On September 23, 1929, at Plainville, Connecticut, he married Florence Trumbull. She was born on November 30, 1904, at Plainville, Connecticut, the daughter of Connecticut governor John H. Trumbull and Maud Pierce Usher. The Coolidges had two daughters:

- Cynthia Coolidge Jeter (October 28, 1933 – January 23, 1989)
- Lydia Coolidge Sayles (August 14, 1939 – March 2, 2001)

Florence died on February 15, 1998, at Plymouth Notch, Vermont, and Coolidge died on May 31, 2000, at Lebanon, Grafton County, New Hampshire. He was buried beside his wife, parents, brother, and several generations of the Coolidge family in the Plymouth Notch Cemetery at Plymouth, Windsor County, Vermont.

== Ancestry and family relations ==
Coolidge's family had deep roots in New England. His earliest American ancestor, John Coolidge, emigrated from Cottenham, Cambridgeshire, England, around 1630 and settled in Watertown, Massachusetts. Coolidge was also descended as follows from Edmund Rice, who arrived at Watertown in 1638 and settled in Sudbury, Massachusetts:

- John Coolidge, son of
  - John Calvin Coolidge Jr. (1872–1933), son of
    - John Calvin Coolidge Sr. (1845–1926), son of
      - Sarah Almeda Brewer (b. c. 1820), daughter of
        - Israel Chase "C." Brewer (b. 1797), son of
          - Sarah "Sally" Rice (b. 1750), daughter of
            - Bezaleel Rice Jr. (1721–1806), son of
              - Bezaleel Rice Sr. (b. 1697), son of
                - David Rice (1659–1723), son of
                  - Henry Rice (1617–1711), son of
                    - Edmund Rice (1594–1663)

He was also a descendant (on his mother's side) of Richard Warren, who arrived at Plymouth in November 1620 aboard the Mayflower. Warren was also the 12th signer of the Mayflower Compact.
