= Union Christian Church =

Church in Plymouth Notch, Vermont, US

Coordinates: 43.5355°N 72.7210°W

Union Christian Church is a historic church located in Plymouth Notch, Vermont. The church was constructed in 1840, and dedicated in 1842. President Calvin Coolidge grew up across the street from the church and attended it as a child. The church building is owned and maintained by the Calvin Coolidge Memorial Foundation and hosts numerous events. The church is adjacent to the Coolidge Homestead.

== Images ==
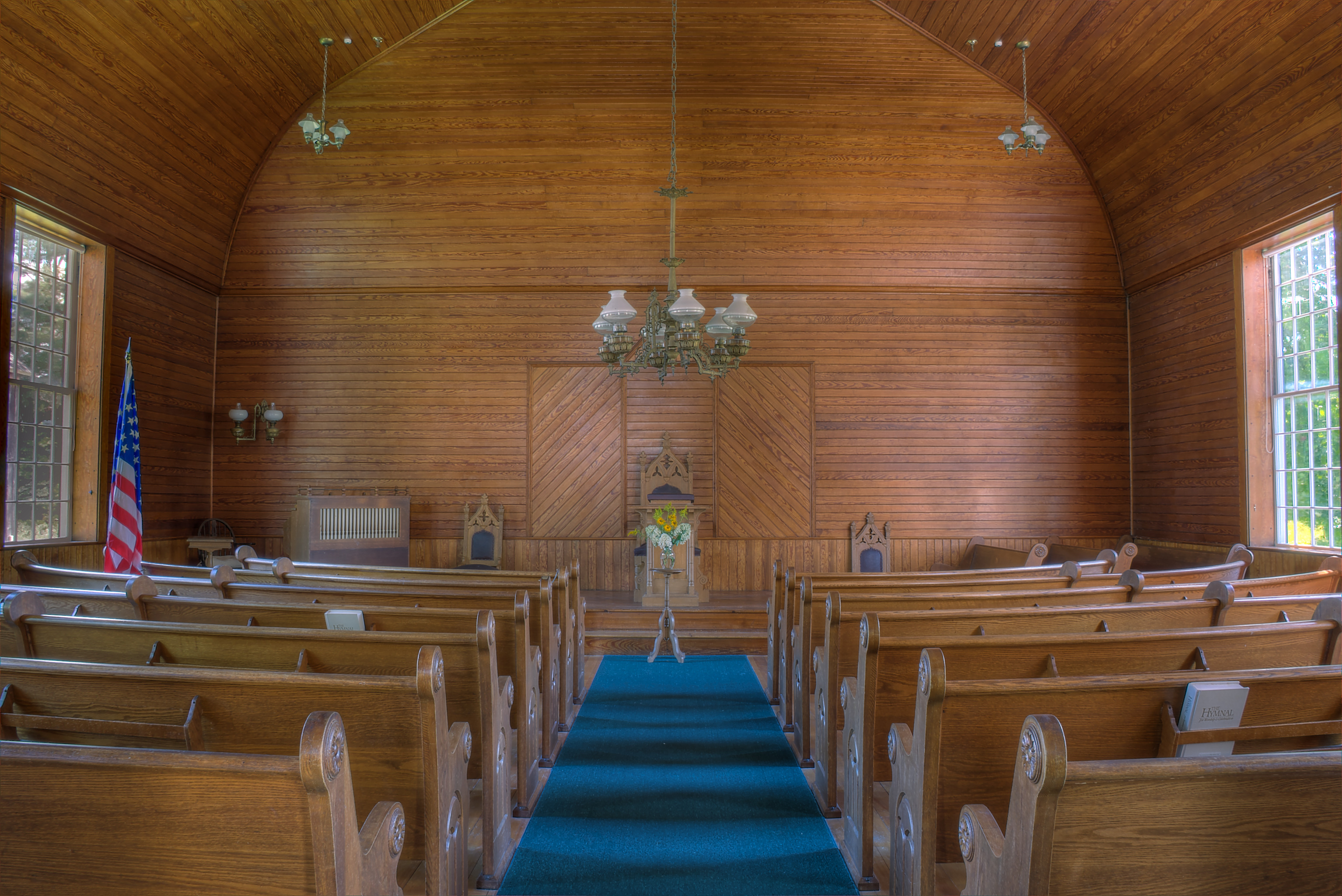
interior view

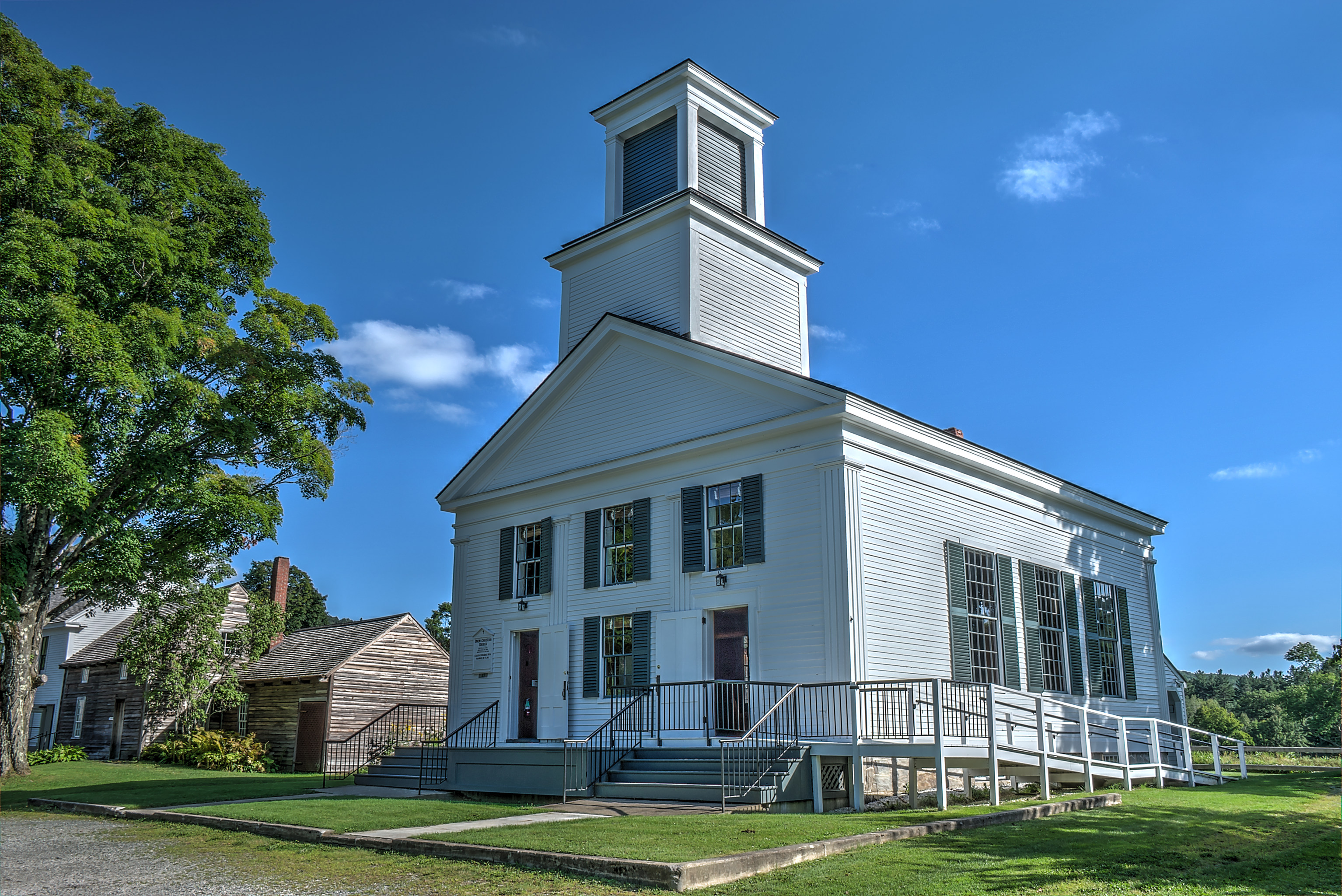
exterior view

== Sources ==
Presidential Avenue: Calvin Coolidge
