= List of burial places of presidents and vice presidents of the United States =

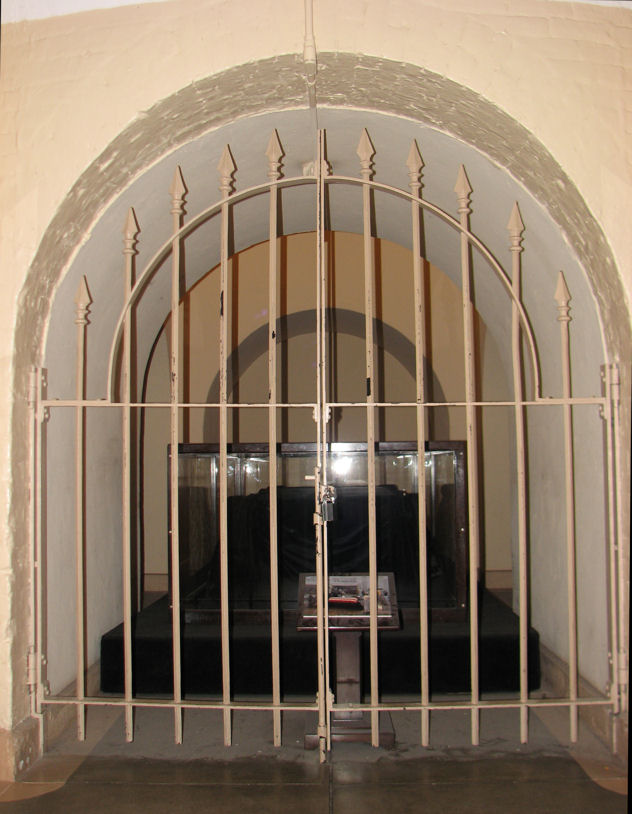
Washington's tomb at the United States Capitol in Washington D.C., originally designed to entomb the body of George Washington

Burial places of presidents and vice presidents of the United States are located across 24 states and the District of Columbia. Since the office was established in 1789, 45 (Note: While by the conventional numbering of U.S. presidents there have been 47 presidents, only 45 individuals have held the office, as Grover Cleveland and Donald Trump, the only presidents to serve non-consecutive terms are counted twice) people have served as President of the United States. Of these, 40 have died. The state with the most presidential burial sites is Virginia with seven. Since its 1789 establishment, 50 people have served as Vice President of the United States. Of these, 44 have died. The state with the most vice-presidential burial sites is New York with 10. Fifteen people have served as both president and as vice president. Of these, 14 have died, and each is listed in both tables. Altogether, 80 people have held either or both offices. Of these, 70 have died.

The first table below lists each deceased president's place of burial, along with the date of death, and the order of their presidency. The second table lists each deceased vice president's place of burial, along with the date of death, and the order of their vice presidency.

== Presidential burial places ==
OP	Name	Death date	Burial place	City	State	Site image
1	George Washington	December 14, 1799	Mount Vernon (Note: Interred at this site on October 7, 1837, after initially being interred in the "old tomb", also at Mount Vernon.)	Fairfax County	Virginia	
2	John Adams	July 4, 1826 (Note: Thomas Jefferson and John Adams both died on July 4, 1826; Jefferson's death occurred approximately five hours before Adams's.)	United First Parish Church (Note: Interred at this site in 1828, after initially being interred in the Hancock Cemetery, Quincy, Massachusetts.)	Quincy	Massachusetts	
3	Thomas Jefferson	July 4, 1826	Monticello	Charlottesville	Virginia	
4	James Madison	June 28, 1836	Montpelier	Orange	Virginia	
5	James Monroe	July 4, 1831	James Monroe Tomb, (Note: Interred at this site on July 5, 1858, after initially being interred in the New York City Marble Cemetery.) Hollywood Cemetery	Richmond	Virginia	
6	John Quincy Adams	February 23, 1848	United First Parish Church (Note: Interred at this site in 1852, after initially being interred in the Congressional Cemetery, Washington, D.C., and then at Hancock Cemetery, Quincy, Massachusetts.)	Quincy	Massachusetts	
7	Andrew Jackson	June 8, 1845	The Hermitage	Nashville	Tennessee	
8	Martin Van Buren	July 24, 1862	Kinderhook Reformed Church Cemetery	Kinderhook	New York	
9	William Henry Harrison	April 4, 1841 (Note: Died in office.)	William Henry Harrison Tomb State Memorial (Note: Interred at this site on July 7, 1841, after initially being interred in the Congressional Cemetery, Washington, D.C.)	North Bend	Ohio	
10	John Tyler	January 18, 1862	Hollywood Cemetery	Richmond	Virginia	
11	James K. Polk	June 15, 1849	Tennessee State Capitol (Note: Interred at this site in 1893, after initially being interred in the Nashville City Cemetery, and then at Polk Place, also in Nashville, Tennessee.)	Nashville	Tennessee	
12	Zachary Taylor	July 9, 1850	Zachary Taylor National Cemetery (Note: Interred at this site in October 1850, after initially being interred in the Congressional Cemetery, Washington, D.C..)	Louisville	Kentucky	
13	Millard Fillmore	March 8, 1874	Forest Lawn Cemetery	Buffalo	New York	
14	Franklin Pierce	October 8, 1869	Old North Cemetery	Concord	New Hampshire	
15	James Buchanan	June 1, 1868	Woodward Hill Cemetery	Lancaster	Pennsylvania	
16	Abraham Lincoln	April 15, 1865	Lincoln Tomb, (Note: Between May 4, 1865, when it first arrived at Oak Ridge Cemetery, and September 26, 1901, Lincoln's casket was moved 17 times, and opened on five occasions.) Oak Ridge Cemetery	Springfield	Illinois	
17	Andrew Johnson	July 31, 1875	Andrew Johnson National Cemetery	Greeneville	Tennessee	
18	Ulysses S. Grant	July 23, 1885	General Grant National Memorial (Note: Interred at this site on April 17, 1897, after initially being interred in Riverside Park, New York City.)	New York	New York	
19	Rutherford B. Hayes	January 17, 1893	Spiegel Grove (Note: Interred at this site on April 3, 1915, after initially being interred in Oakwood Cemetery, Fremont, Ohio.)	Fremont	Ohio	
20	James A. Garfield	September 19, 1881	James A. Garfield Memorial, (Note: Interred at this site on May 19, 1890, after initially being interred in a temporary vault, also at Lake View Cemetery.) Lake View Cemetery	Cleveland	Ohio	
21	Chester A. Arthur	November 18, 1886	Albany Rural Cemetery	Menands	New York	
22/24 (Note: Grover Cleveland served two non-consecutive terms in office, and due to this is counted as the nation's 22nd president and its 24th president.)	Grover Cleveland	June 24, 1908	Princeton Cemetery	Princeton	New Jersey	
23	Benjamin Harrison	March 13, 1901	Crown Hill Cemetery	Indianapolis	Indiana	
25	William McKinley	September 14, 1901	McKinley National Memorial (Note: Interred at this site in September 1907, after initially being interred in West Lawn Cemetery, Canton, Ohio.)	Canton	Ohio	
26	Theodore Roosevelt	January 6, 1919	Youngs Memorial Cemetery	Oyster Bay	New York	
27	William Howard Taft	March 8, 1930	Arlington National Cemetery	Arlington	Virginia	
28	Woodrow Wilson	February 3, 1924	Washington National Cathedral	Washington, D.C.		
29	Warren G. Harding	August 2, 1923	Harding Tomb (Note: Interred at this site in 1927, after initially being interred in Marion Cemetery Receiving Vault, Marion, Ohio.)	Marion	Ohio	
30	Calvin Coolidge	January 5, 1933	Plymouth Notch Cemetery	Plymouth Notch	Vermont	
31	Herbert Hoover	October 20, 1964	Herbert Hoover Presidential Library and Museum	West Branch	Iowa	
32	Franklin D. Roosevelt	April 12, 1945	Springwood	Hyde Park	New York	
33	Harry S. Truman	December 26, 1972	Harry S. Truman Presidential Library and Museum	Independence	Missouri	
34	Dwight D. Eisenhower	March 28, 1969	Eisenhower Presidential Center	Abilene	Kansas	
35	John F. Kennedy	November 22, 1963	Kennedy gravesite, (Note: Interred at this site on March 14, 1967, after initially being interred in a temporary grave, also at Arlington National Cemetery.) Arlington National Cemetery	Arlington	Virginia	
36	Lyndon B. Johnson	January 22, 1973	Lyndon B. Johnson National Historical Park	Stonewall	Texas	
37	Richard Nixon	April 22, 1994	Richard Nixon Presidential Library and Museum	Yorba Linda	California	
38	Gerald Ford	December 26, 2006	Gerald R. Ford Presidential Museum	Grand Rapids	Michigan	
39	Jimmy Carter	December 29, 2024	Jimmy Carter National Historical Park	Plains	Georgia	
40	Ronald Reagan	June 5, 2004	Ronald Reagan Presidential Library	Simi Valley	California	
41	George H. W. Bush	November 30, 2018	George H. W. Bush Presidential Library and Museum	College Station	Texas	

=== Notes ===
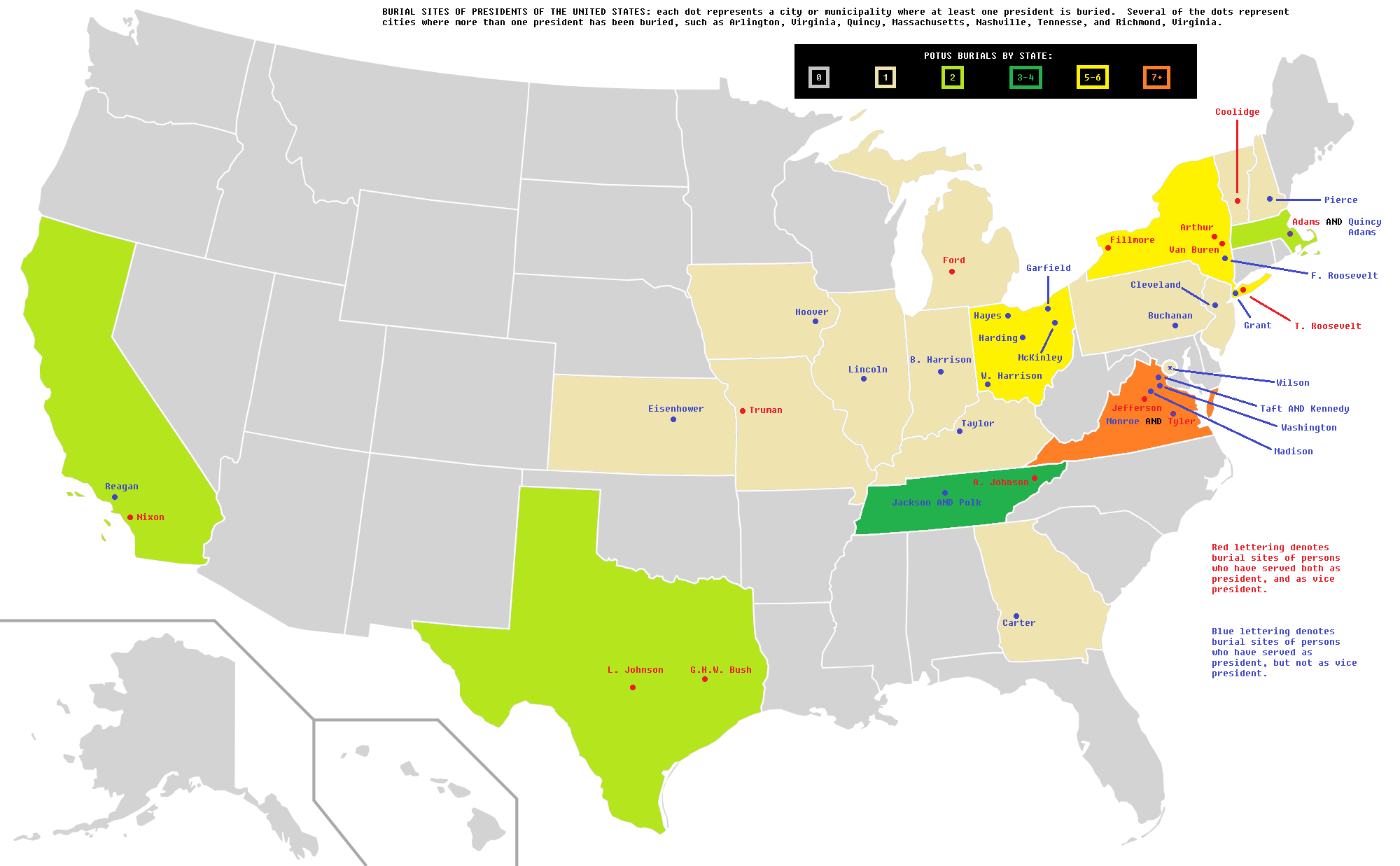
Map showing burial sites of U.S. presidents

== Vice presidential burial places ==
OVP	Name	Death Date	Burial Place	City	State	Site image
1	John Adams	July 4, 1826 (Note: Thomas Jefferson and John Adams both died on July 4, 1826; Jefferson's death occurred approximately five hours before Adams's.)	United First Parish Church (Note: Interred at this site in 1828, after initially being interred in the Hancock Cemetery, Quincy, Massachusetts.)	Quincy	Massachusetts	
2	Thomas Jefferson	July 4, 1826	Monticello	Charlottesville	Virginia	
3	Aaron Burr	September 14, 1836	Princeton Cemetery	Princeton	New Jersey	
4	George Clinton	April 20, 1812 (Note: Died in office.)	Old Dutch Churchyard (Note: Interred at this site in 1908, after initially being interred in the Congressional Cemetery, Washington, D.C..)	Kingston	New York	
5	Elbridge Gerry	November 23, 1814	Congressional Cemetery	Washington, D.C.		
6	Daniel Tompkins	June 11, 1825	St. Mark's Church in-the-Bowery	New York City	New York	
7	John C. Calhoun	March 31, 1850	St. Phillips Churchyard	Charleston	South Carolina	
8	Martin Van Buren	July 24, 1862	Kinderhook Reformed Church Cemetery	Kinderhook	New York	
9	Richard Johnson	November 19, 1850	Frankfort Cemetery	Frankfort	Kentucky	
10	John Tyler	January 18, 1862	Hollywood Cemetery	Richmond	Virginia	
11	George M. Dallas	December 31, 1864	Churchyard of St. Peter's Episcopal Church	Philadelphia	Pennsylvania	
12	Millard Fillmore	March 8, 1874	Forest Lawn Cemetery	Buffalo	New York	
13	William R. King	April 18, 1853	Live Oak Cemetery (Note: Interred at this site in 1882, after initially being interred at Chestnut Hill, his plantation near Selma, Alabama.)	Selma	Alabama	
14	John C. Breckinridge	May 17, 1875	Lexington Cemetery	Lexington	Kentucky	
15	Hannibal Hamlin	July 4, 1891	Mount Hope Cemetery	Bangor	Maine	
16	Andrew Johnson	July 31, 1875	Andrew Johnson National Cemetery	Greeneville	Tennessee	
17	Schuyler Colfax	January 13, 1885	City Cemetery	South Bend	Indiana	
18	Henry Wilson	November 22, 1875	Old Dell Park Cemetery	Natick	Massachusetts	
19	William A. Wheeler	June 4, 1887	Morningside Cemetery	Malone	New York	
20	Chester Arthur	November 18, 1886	Albany Rural Cemetery	Menands	New York	
21	Thomas A. Hendricks	November 25, 1885	Crown Hill Cemetery	Indianapolis	Indiana	
22	Levi P. Morton	May 16, 1920	Rhinebeck Cemetery	Rhinebeck	New York	
23	Adlai Stevenson I	June 14, 1914	Evergreen Cemetery	Bloomington	Illinois	
24	Garret Hobart	November 21, 1899	Cedar Lawn Cemetery	Paterson	New Jersey	
25	Theodore Roosevelt	January 6, 1919	Youngs Memorial Cemetery	Oyster Bay	New York	
26	Charles W. Fairbanks	June 4, 1918	Crown Hill Cemetery	Indianapolis	Indiana	
27	James S. Sherman	October 30, 1912	Forest Hill Cemetery	Utica	New York	
28	Thomas R. Marshall	June 1, 1925	Crown Hill Cemetery	Indianapolis	Indiana	
29	Calvin Coolidge	January 5, 1933	Plymouth Notch Cemetery	Plymouth Notch	Vermont	
30	Charles G. Dawes	April 23, 1951	Rosehill Cemetery	Chicago	Illinois	
31	Charles Curtis	February 8, 1936	Topeka Cemetery	Topeka	Kansas	
32	John Nance Garner	November 7, 1967	Uvalde Cemetery	Uvalde	Texas	
33	Henry A. Wallace	November 18, 1965	Glendale Cemetery	Des Moines	Iowa	
34	Harry S. Truman	December 26, 1972	Harry S. Truman Presidential Library and Museum	Independence	Missouri	
35	Alben W. Barkley	April 30, 1956	Mount Kenton Cemetery	Paducah	Kentucky	
36	Richard Nixon	April 22, 1994	Richard Nixon Presidential Library and Museum	Yorba Linda	California	
37	Lyndon B. Johnson	January 22, 1973	Lyndon B. Johnson National Historical Park	Stonewall	Texas	
38	Hubert Humphrey	January 13, 1978	Lakewood Cemetery	Minneapolis	Minnesota	
39	Spiro Agnew	September 17, 1996	Dulaney Valley Memorial Gardens	Timonium	Maryland	
40	Gerald Ford	December 26, 2006	Gerald R. Ford Presidential Museum	Grand Rapids	Michigan	
41	Nelson Rockefeller	January 26, 1979	Rockefeller Family Cemetery	Sleepy Hollow	New York	
42	Walter Mondale	April 19, 2021	(Unknown) (Note: As of 2022, Mondale's family was intending to inter his cremated remains in Lakewood Cemetery, Minneapolis, Minnesota.)			
43	George H. W. Bush	November 30, 2018	George H. W. Bush Presidential Library and Museum	College Station	Texas	
46	Dick Cheney	November 3, 2025	(Unknown)			

=== Notes ===
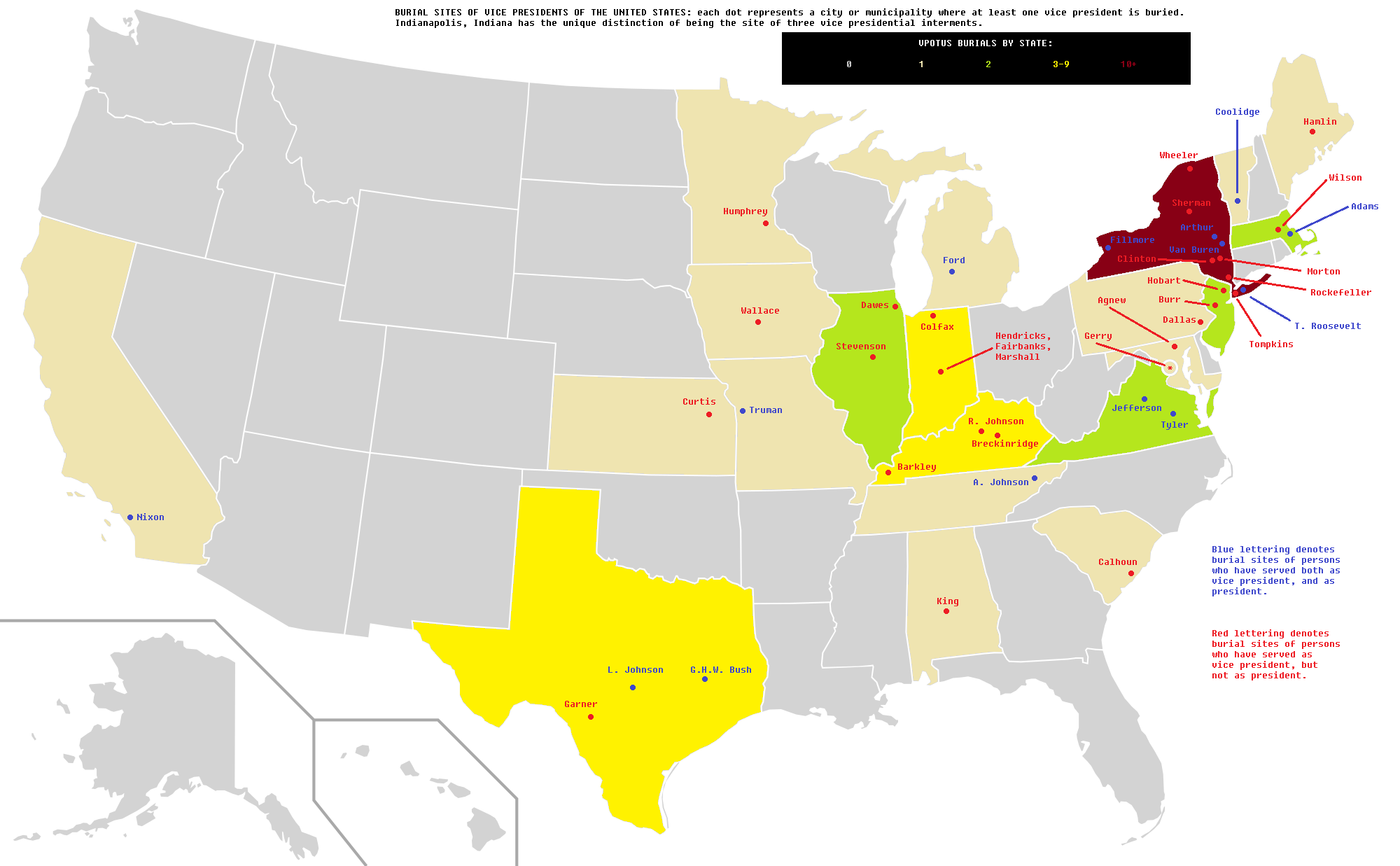
Map showing burial sites of U.S. vice presidents

== See also ==
- State funerals in the United States
- Attempted theft of George Washington's skull
- List of burial places of justices of the Supreme Court of the United States
- Presidential memorials in the United States
