= Esther Sumner Damon =

Last American revolutionary war widow (1814–1906)

- Born: Esther Sumner; August 1, 1814; Bridgewater, Vermont, US
- Died: November 11, 1906 (aged 92); Plymouth, Vermont, US
- Occupation: Schoolteacher
- Known for: The last American Revolutionary War widow to receive a state pension
- Spouse: Noah D. Damon

Esther Sumner Damon (August 1, 1814 – November 11, 1906) was cited as the last widow of the American Revolutionary War to receive a state pension.

Esther was born in Bridgewater, Vermont. The family had eight or nine children. Esther's father was killed by a falling tree when she was eight years old. Esther attended school during the winter and worked during the summers to help support her family. At the age of seventeen, Esther became a school teacher in Plymouth.

Esther Sumner married Noah D. Damon (August 25, 1760 – July 2, 1853) on September 6, 1835, in Bridgewater, when she was 21 and he was 75. The couple had met two weeks prior.

== Husband's war service ==
Noah Damon
- Born: Noah D. Damon; August 25, 1760; Benton, New Hampshire, British America
- Died: July 2, 1853 (aged 92) Norfolk County, Massachusetts, U.S.
- Allegiance: United States
- Branch: Continental Army
- Service years: 1775-1848 (retired)
- Rank: Private

Noah Damon enlisted in the Continental Army on April 19, 1775, as a private with the Massachusetts troops. Over the next five years, he served from as little as six days to eight months in various companies and regiments. Noah applied for a war pension, as a resident of Plainfield, New Hampshire on November 13, 1848.

Noah was penniless, though Esther may have thought he was a hardworking landowner. Esther supported him for three years before financial necessity forced him to move in with his daughter in New Hampshire.

Esther supported herself by sewing and nursing. She also leased a farm near Reading.

After Noah's death in 1853, Esther applied for and received his pension from October 1855. The pension was increased to $24 a month by the United States Congress on February 28, 1905.

Towards the end of her life, Esther received additional financial support from the Daughters of the American Revolution.

Esther died on November 11, 1906, aged 92, and was buried at Plymouth Notch Cemetery in Plymouth, Vermont. The gravestone was paid for by the Daughters of the American Revolution.
