= Calvin Galusha Coolidge =

American politician

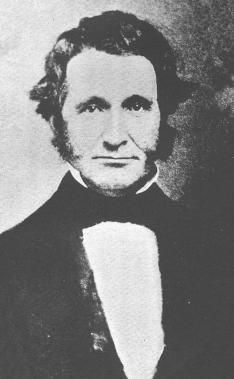

Member of the Vermont House of Representatives from Plymouth
- In office 1860–1862
- Preceded by: J. A. Pollard
- Succeeded by: James S. Brown

Personal details
- Born: September 22, 1815 Plymouth, Vermont, U.S.
- Died: December 15, 1878 (aged 63) Plymouth, Vermont, U.S.
- Resting place: Plymouth Notch Cemetery, Plymouth, Vermont
- Spouse: Sarah Brewer
- Relations: Calvin Coolidge (grandson)
- Children: John Calvin Coolidge Sr. (son)
- Occupation: Farmer and politician

Calvin Galusha Coolidge (September 22, 1815 – December 15, 1878) was an American farmer and politician.

== Background ==
Calvin G. Coolidge was born in Plymouth, Vermont. His parents were Calvin Coolidge (1780–1853) and Sarah Thompson (1789–1856). Coolidge was a farmer. He served in local government as a justice of the peace, constable, and selectman. He served in the Vermont House of Representatives in 1860 and 1861. He was the father of John Calvin Coolidge Sr., who also served in the Vermont General Assembly, and the grandfather of Calvin Coolidge, the 30th President of the United States. Coolidge died in Plymouth, Vermont in 1878 at the age of 63.
