= Coolidge Homestead =

Childhood home of the 30th President of the US

Coordinates: 43°32′09″N 72°43′20″W

- Calvin Coolidge Homestead District
- U.S. National Register of Historic Places
- U.S. National Historic Landmark District
- U.S. Historic district – Contributing property
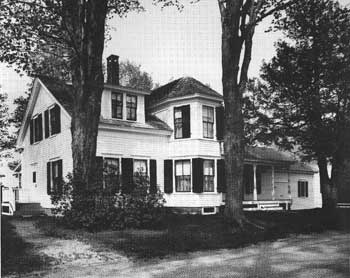
- The Coolidge Homestead, 1976.

- Location within Vermont Location within the United States
- Location: Plymouth Notch, Vermont
- Area: 130 acres (53 ha)
- Built: 1872
- Part of: Plymouth Historic District (ID70000084)
- NRHP reference No.: 66000794

Significant dates
- Added to NRHP: October 15, 1966
- Designated NHLD: June 23, 1965
- Designated CP: December 12, 1970

The Coolidge Homestead, also known as Calvin Coolidge Homestead District or President Calvin Coolidge State Historic Site, was the childhood home of the 30th president of the United States, Calvin Coolidge and the place where he first took the presidential oath of office. Located in Plymouth Notch, Vermont, Coolidge lived there from age four in 1876 to 1887, when he departed for Black River Academy for education. He is buried in Plymouth Notch Cemetery not far from the home.

== History ==
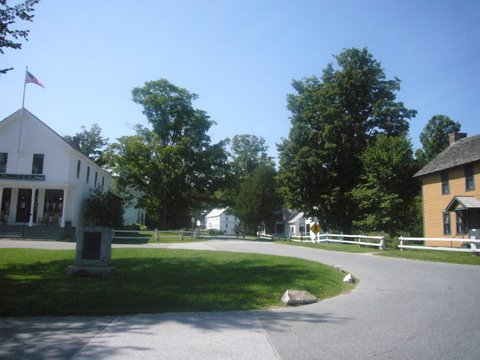
Plymouth Notch, Vermont. Coolidge was born in the rear of the general store in the foreground and the Coolidge's still operative cheese company is in the distance in the background

The home was bought by his father, John Coolidge, who expanded it from a simple 1 1/2-story farm house to its present size and appearance today.

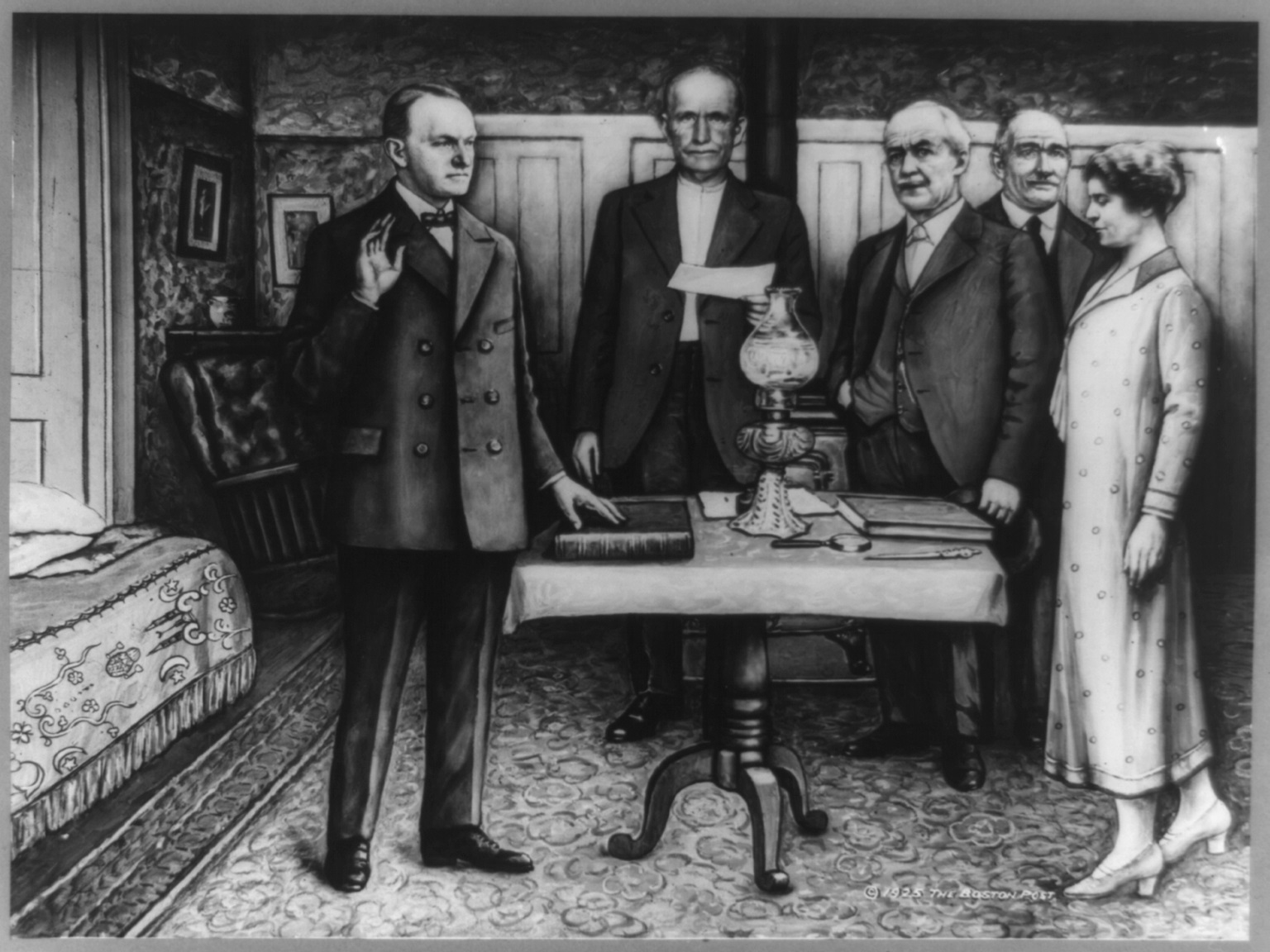
The first inauguration of Calvin Coolidge

Despite living most of his life in Northampton, Massachusetts, Calvin Coolidge often returned to the homestead to visit his family, and he was staying there when President Warren G. Harding died. Coolidge was sworn in by his father in the family parlor after taking the Oath of Office for the presidency. Due to his father's refusal to modernize the house it remains in the same condition, and in some cases with the same furnishings, as it was the night Coolidge took the oath. The Inaugural Room itself is behind glass, but a visitor can stand in an alcove and see the lamp, Bible, and table that were used in the ceremony, all placed in their historic positions.

The Homestead District includes:

- A Visitors Center
- Coolidge Homestead
- Farmer's Museum
- Wilder House
- Wilder Horse Barn
- Old Coolidge Farmhouse/Florence Ciley General Store/Coolidge Hall
- Coolidge Farm Shop
- Plymouth Cheese Factory (cheese making museum upstairs)
- One-Room Schoolhouse
- Azro Johnson House
- Union Christian Church
- Carrie Brown Coolidge Garden (begun by the President's stepmother)
- Aldrich House
- Top of the Notch Cabins (1927 tourist accommodations)
- Brown Family Farmhouse
- Plymouth Notch Cemetery

The district was declared a National Historic Landmark in 1965.

Today, the Coolidge Homestead is part of the Calvin Coolidge State Historical Site overseen by the state of Vermont. As far as possible the buildings have been returned to the conditions they were in when Coolidge was president. A simple video and picture display of his life is shown in the barn. The rooms in Coolidge Hall that he used as a Summer White House in 1924 have been restored and a video of contemporary newsreel film added.

It is located west and north of Vermont Route 100A in Plymouth Notch, and open daily from 9:30 A.M. to 5:00 P.M, late May to mid-October. Four generations of the family, including the President, are buried in nearby Plymouth Notch Cemetery. The Calvin Coolidge State Park, a developed part of the Coolidge State Forest, is also close by.

== Images ==
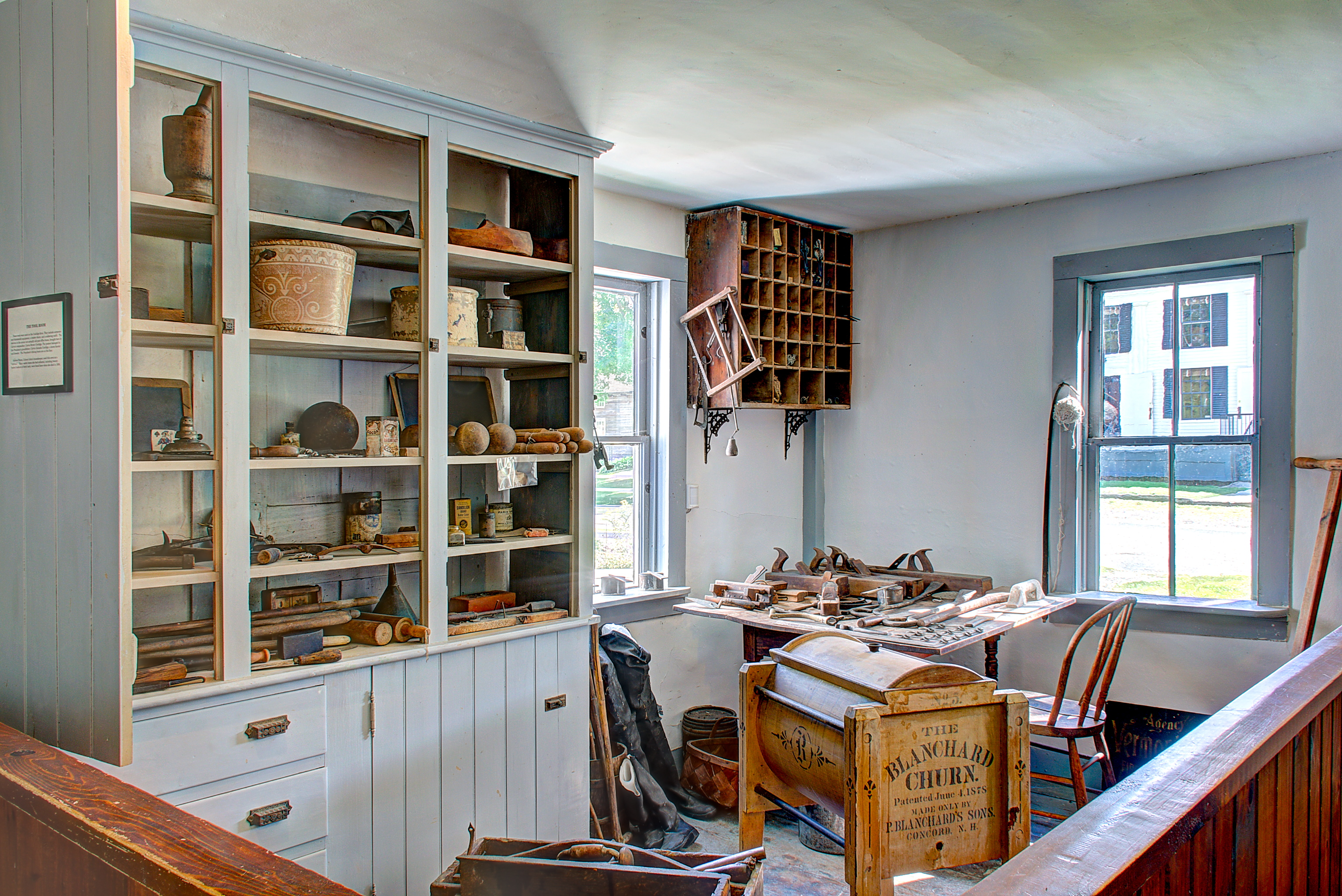
The Tool Room

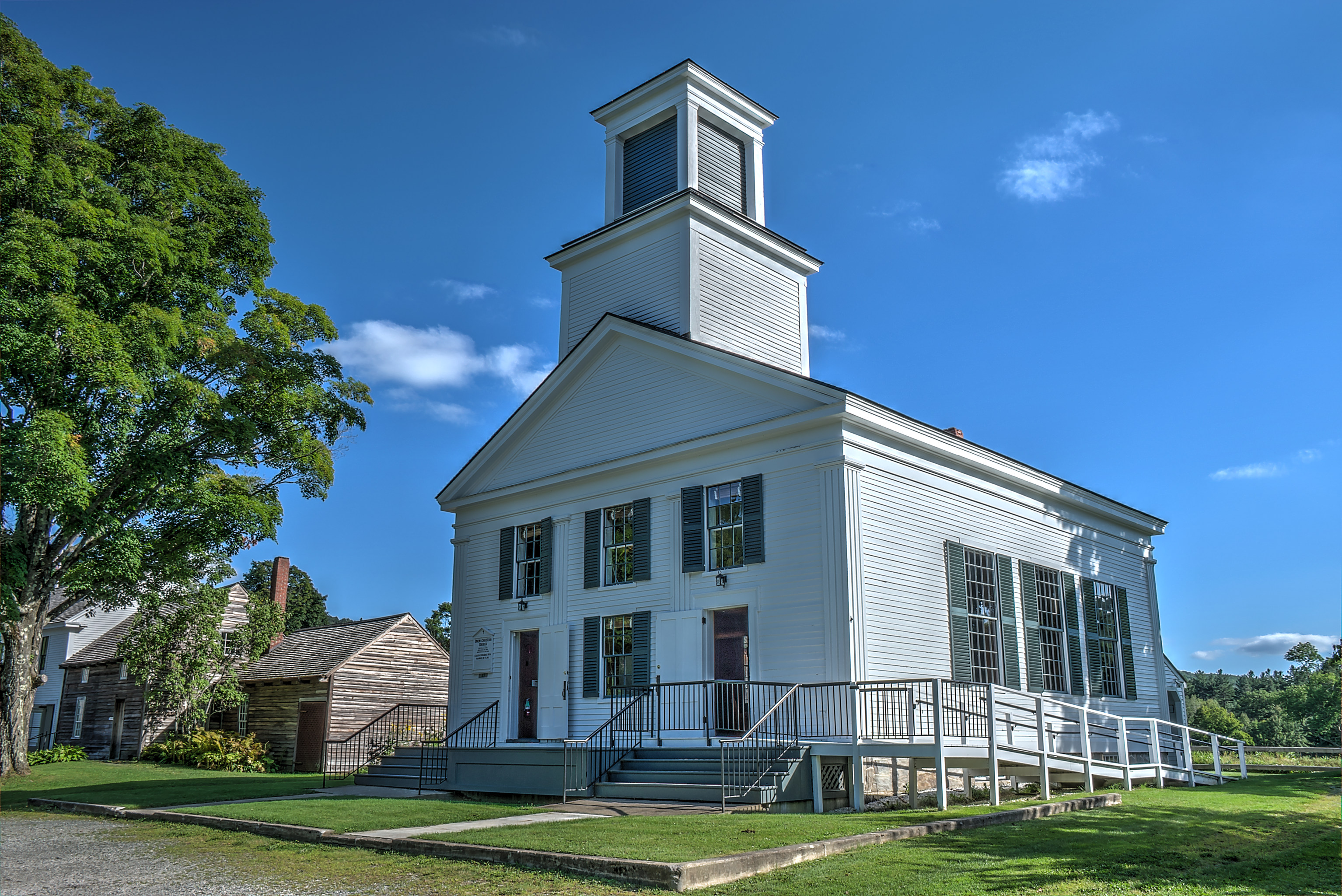
Union Christian Church

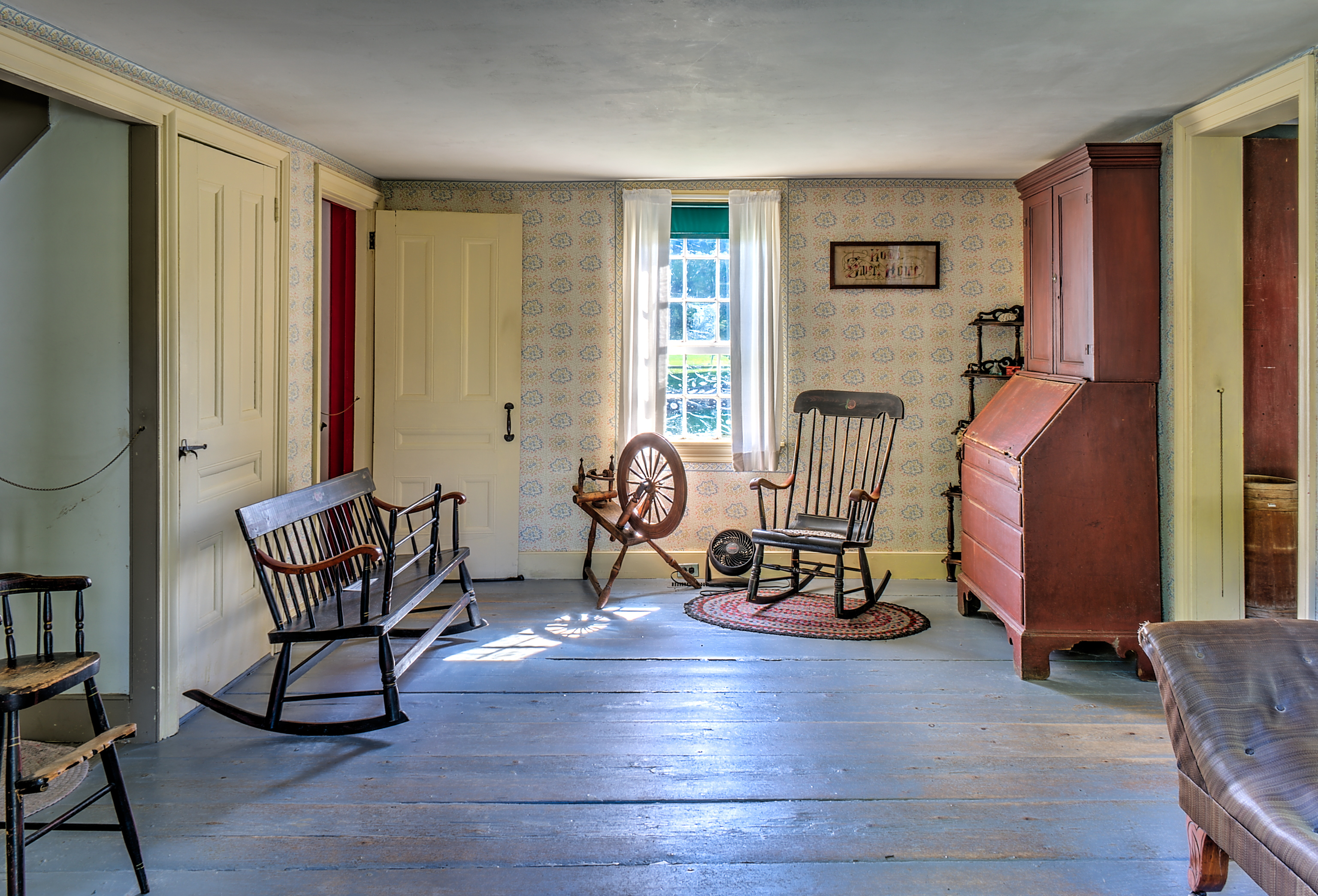
Calvin Coolidge Birthplace

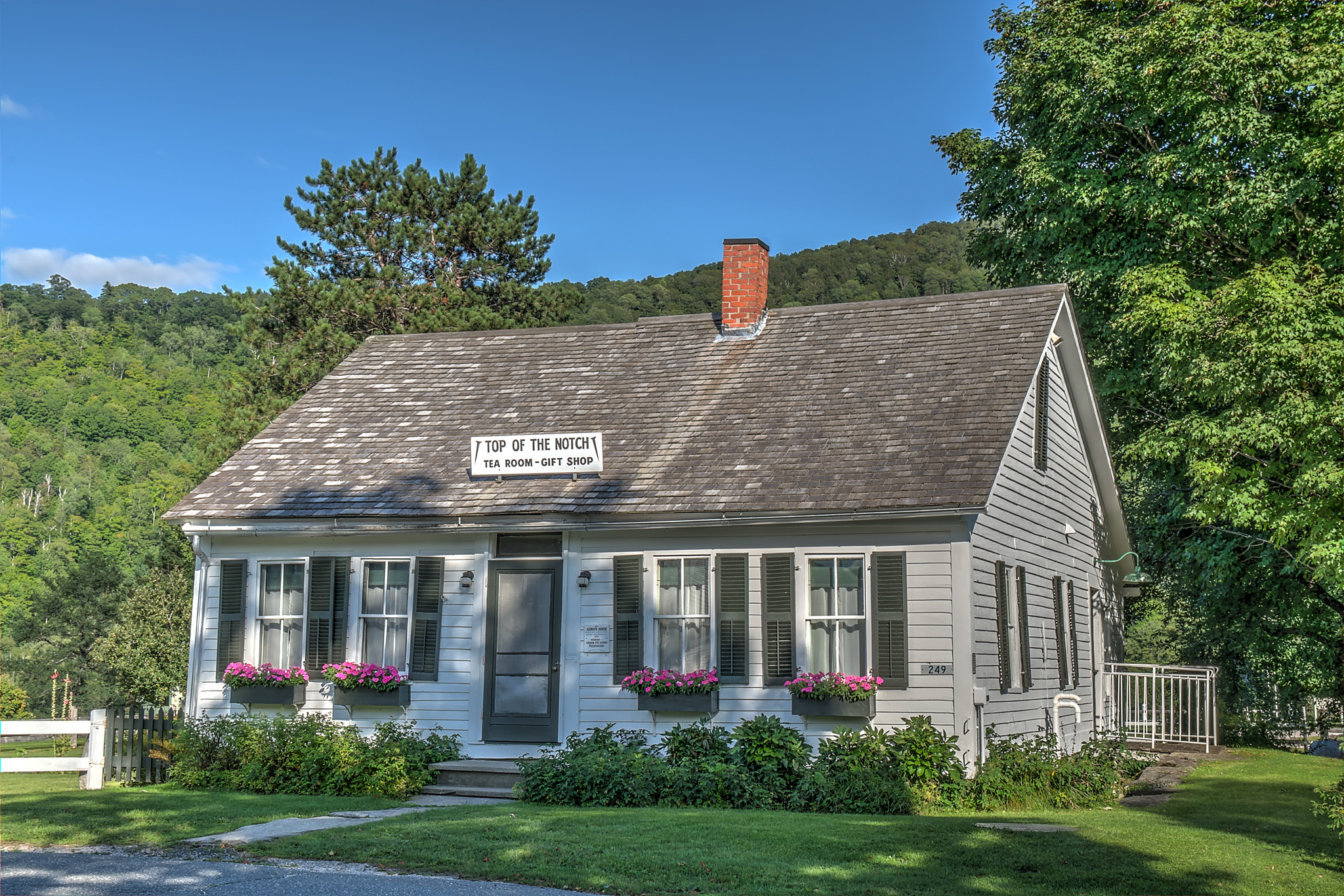
Top of the Notch Cabins

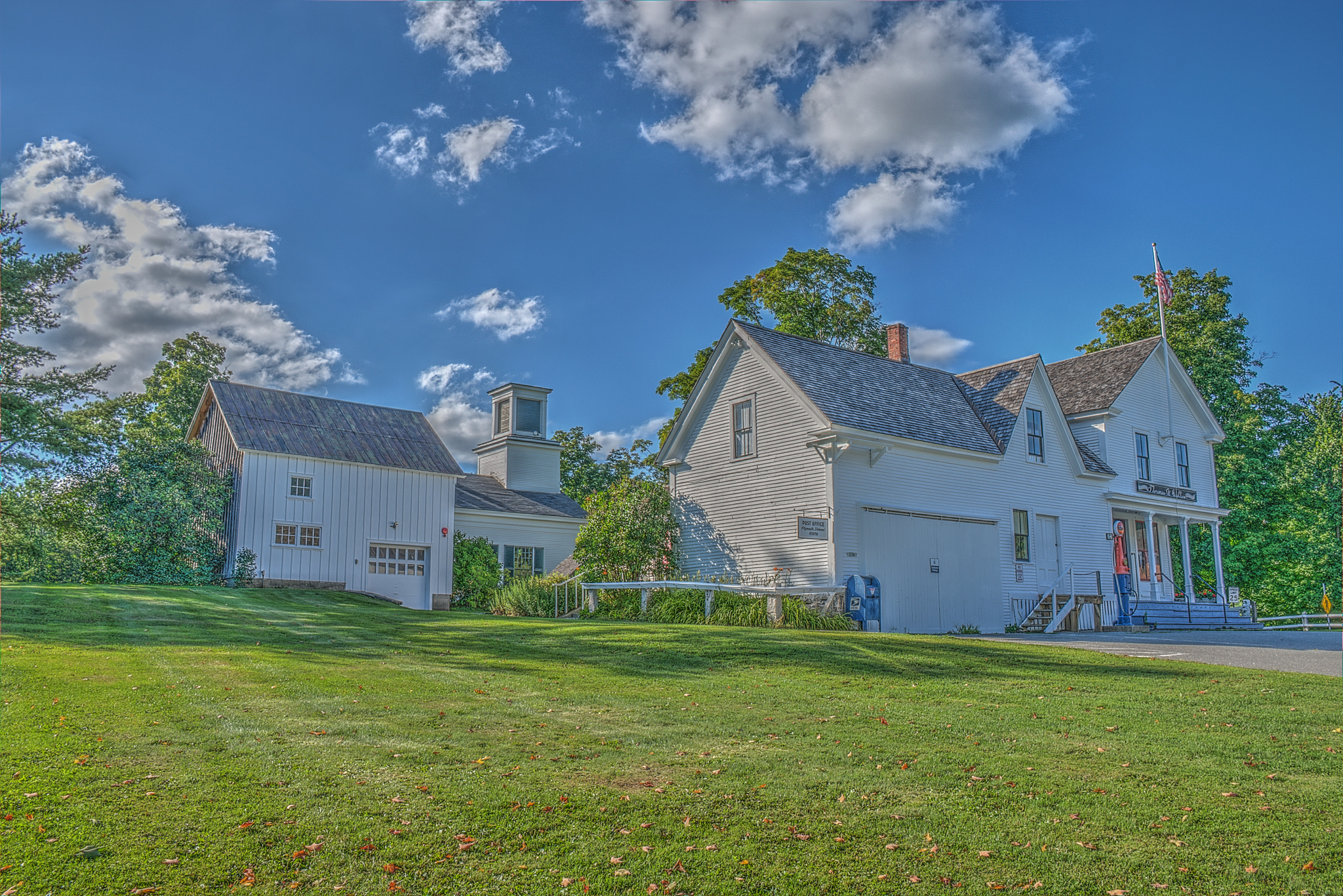
Florence Ciley General Store / Coolidge Hall

Coolidge Hall

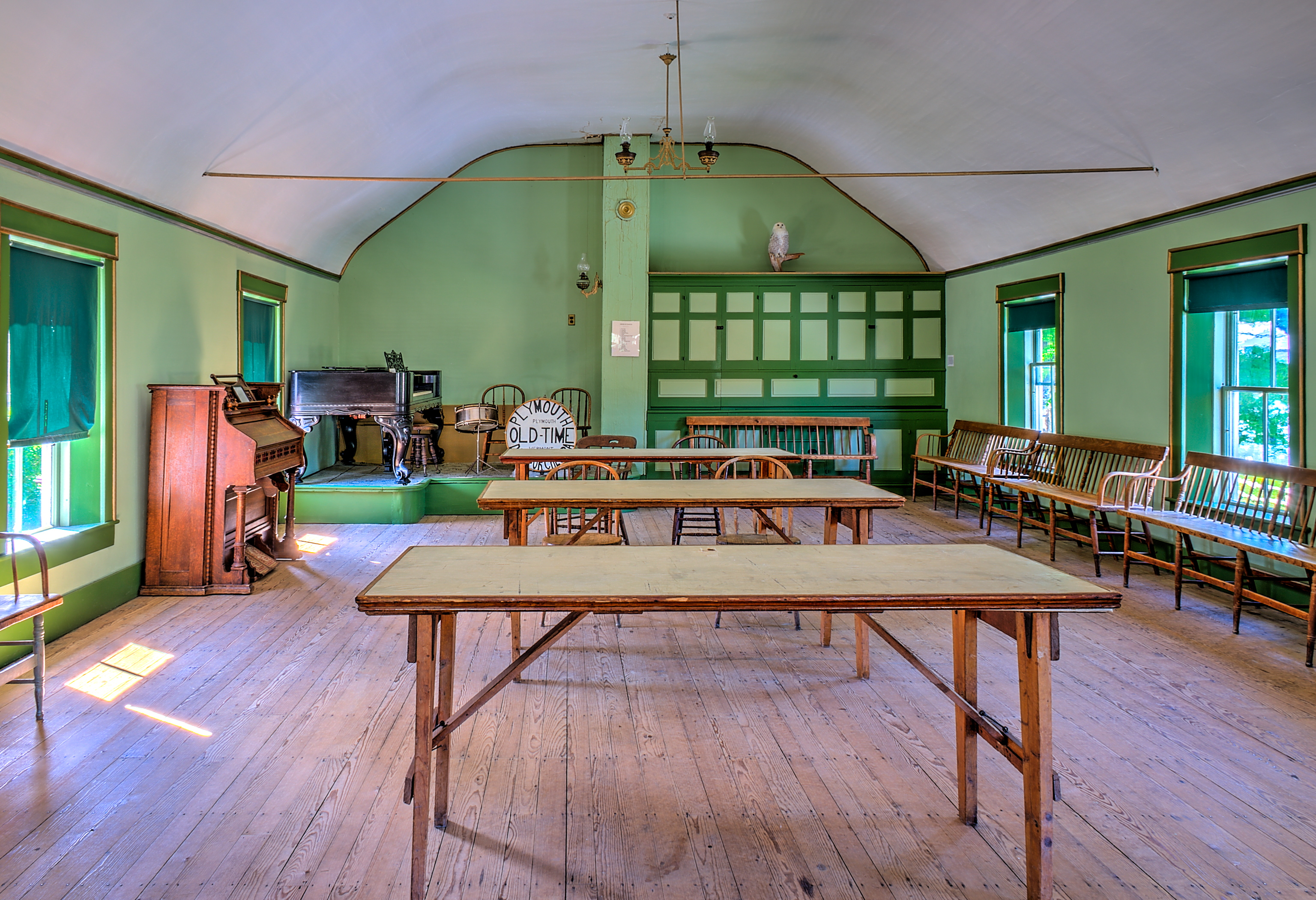
Coolidge Hall

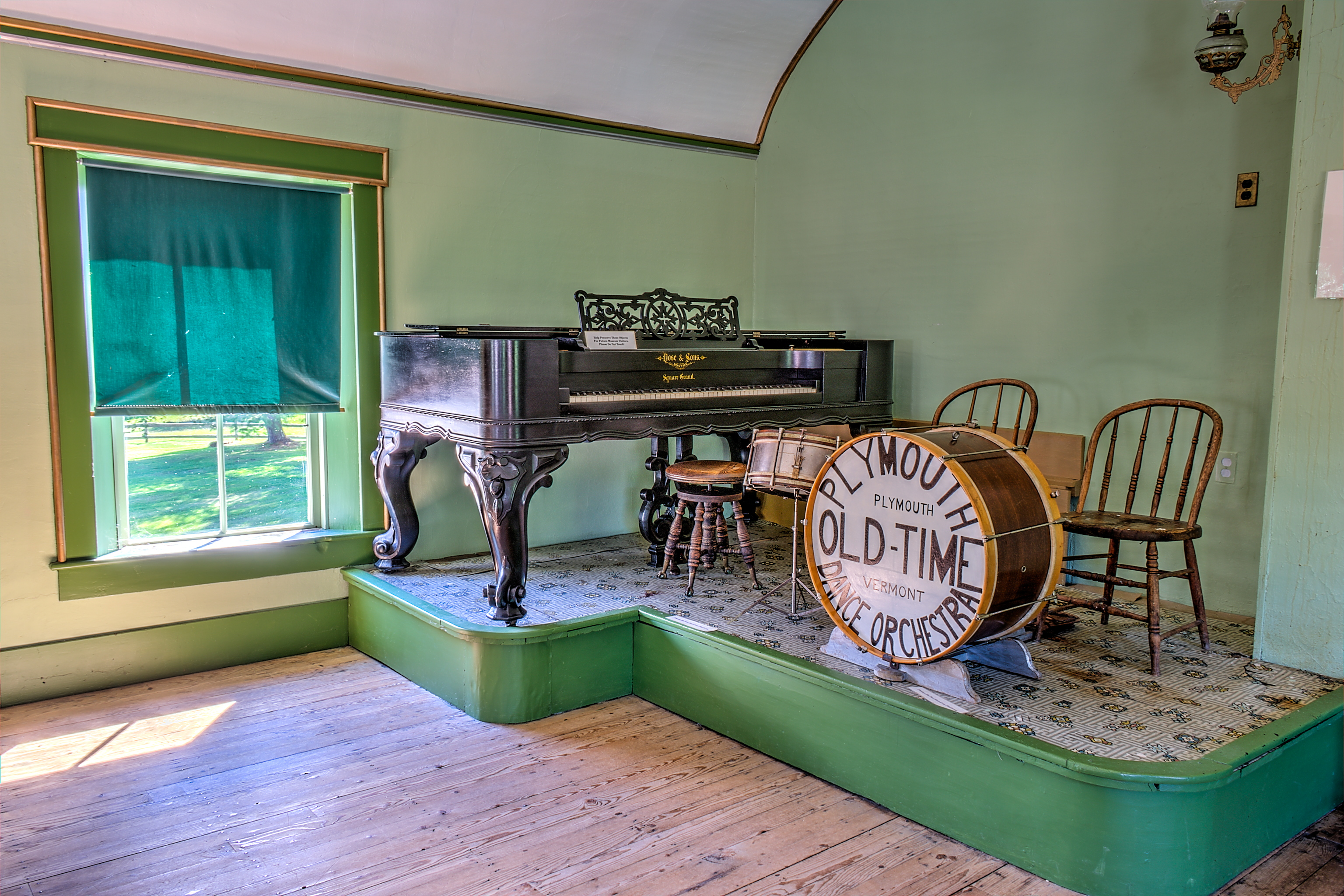
Detail of instruments

Wilder Barn

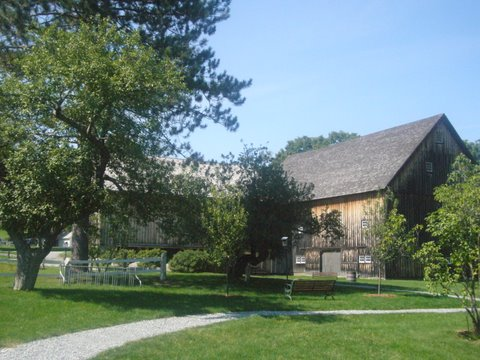
Exterior

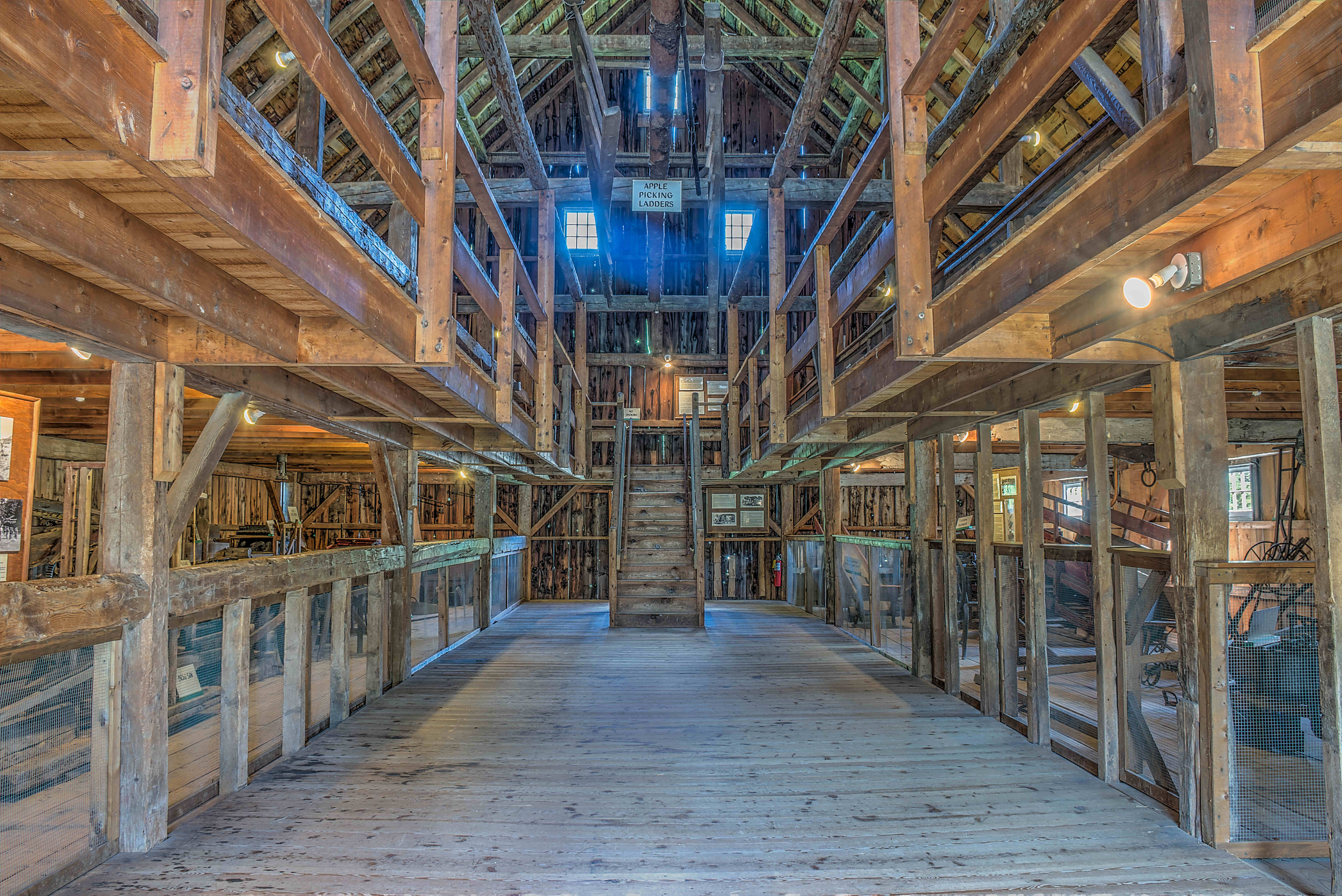
Interior

Wilder Horse Barn Exhibits

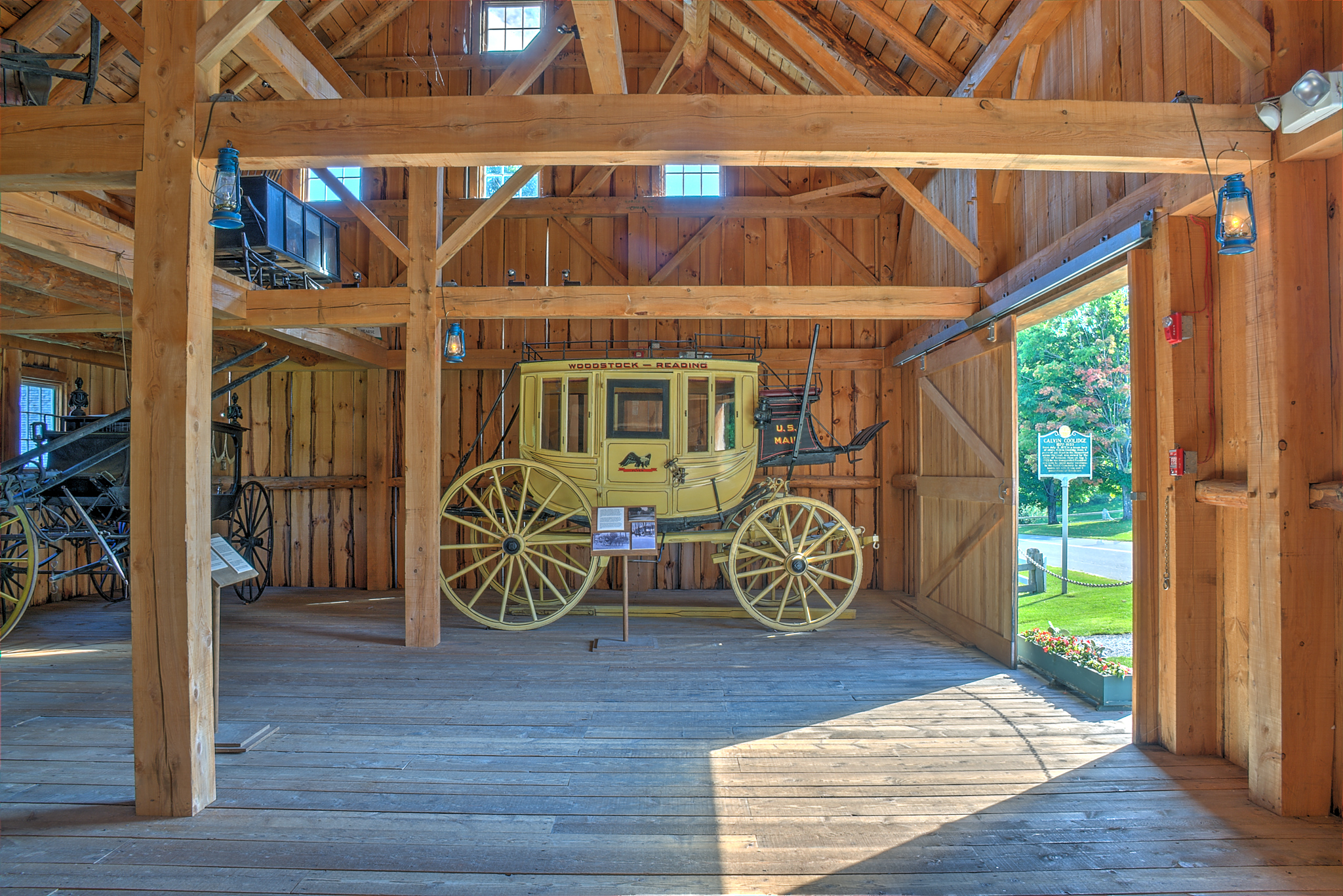
19th century carriage

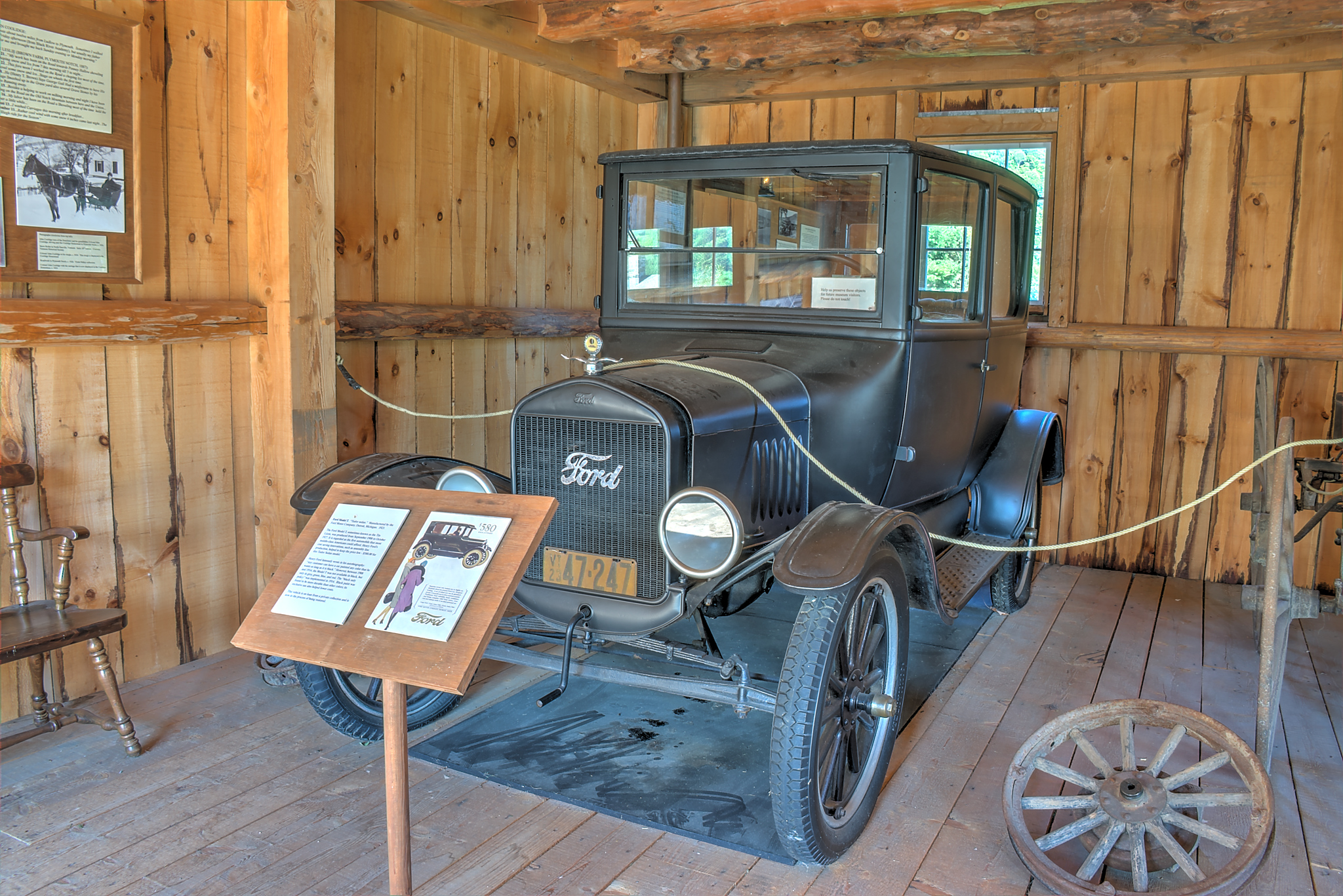
1923 Model T Ford

== See also ==
- Calvin Coolidge House, Northampton, Massachusetts
- List of residences of presidents of the United States
- List of National Historic Landmarks in Vermont
- National Register of Historic Places listings in Windsor County, Vermont
- Presidential memorials in the United States
