= John Calvin Coolidge Sr. =

American politician

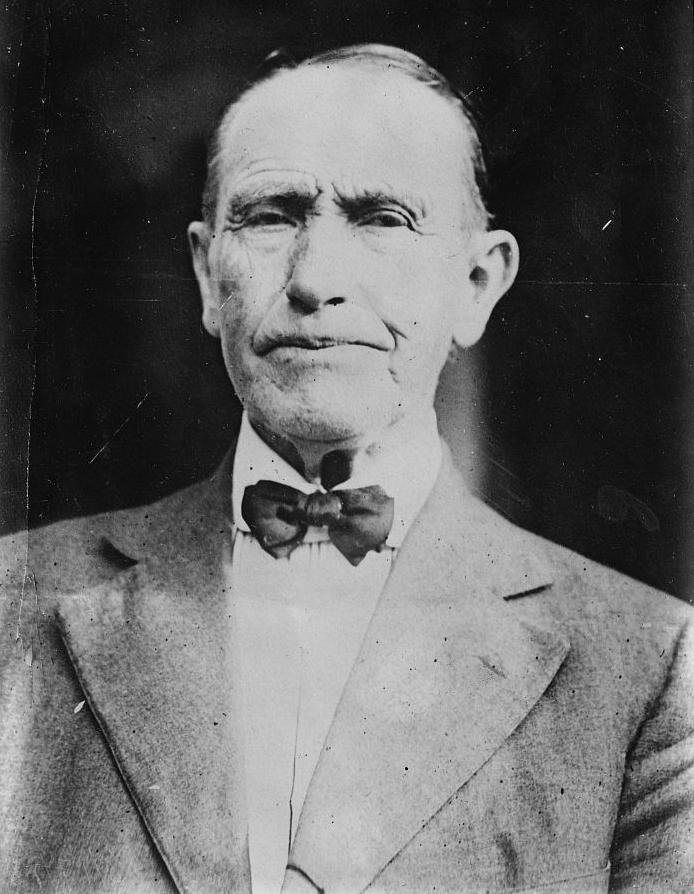
- Coolidge in an undated photograph

Member of the Vermont Senate from Windsor County
- In office 1910–1912 Serving with: Edward A. Davis; Edward H. Edgerton
- Preceded by: F. Thomas Kidder; Edward B. Flinn; Loyal E. Sherwin
- Succeeded by: Herbert H. Blanchard; David A. Elliott; Don C. Pollard

Member of the Vermont House of Representatives from Plymouth
- In office 1872–1878
- Preceded by: Charles A. Scott
- Succeeded by: Alonzo F. Hubbard

Justice of the Peace for Plymouth, Vermont
- In office 1880–1900
- In office 1916–1924

Member of the Plymouth, Vermont Selectboard
- In office 1869–1872

Personal details
- Born: John Calvin Coolidge; March 31, 1845 Plymouth, Vermont, U.S
- Died: March 18, 1926 (aged 80) Plymouth, Vermont, U.S
- Party: Republican
- Spouses: Victoria Josephine Moor (m. 1868; died 1885) Caroline Athelia Brown (m. 1891; died 1920)
- Children: 2, Including Calvin
- Parents: Calvin Galusha Coolidge; Sarah Brewer Coolidge
- Relatives: John Coolidge (grandson)
- Occupation: Businessman, Politician, Banker, Farmer

Military service
- Allegiance: Union; United States; State of Vermont
- Branch/service: Vermont Militia
- Years of service: 1860–1869; 1900–1902
- Rank: Colonel
- Unit: 10th Regiment, Vermont Militia; Military staff of Governor William W. Stickney
- Commands: Company K, 10th Regiment

John Calvin Coolidge Sr. (March 31, 1845 – March 18, 1926) was an American politician and businessman from Vermont, and the father of Calvin Coolidge, the 30th president of the United States. The senior Coolidge administered the presidential oath of office to his son at their family homestead in the early morning hours of August 3, 1923, following the death of President Warren G. Harding.

Born in Plymouth, Vermont, Coolidge was a farmer and store owner, and worked at a variety of other occupations, including banker and insurance broker. In addition, he was a veteran of the Vermont militia, and held the law enforcement posts of town constable and county deputy sheriff. A prominent local leader, he served in numerous Plymouth town offices, and was elected to terms in both the Vermont House of Representatives and Vermont Senate.

Coolidge remained active in his farming and business interests until his death in Plymouth in 1926; he was buried in Plymouth Notch at a village cemetery where several generations of his family are also buried.

== Political and business career ==
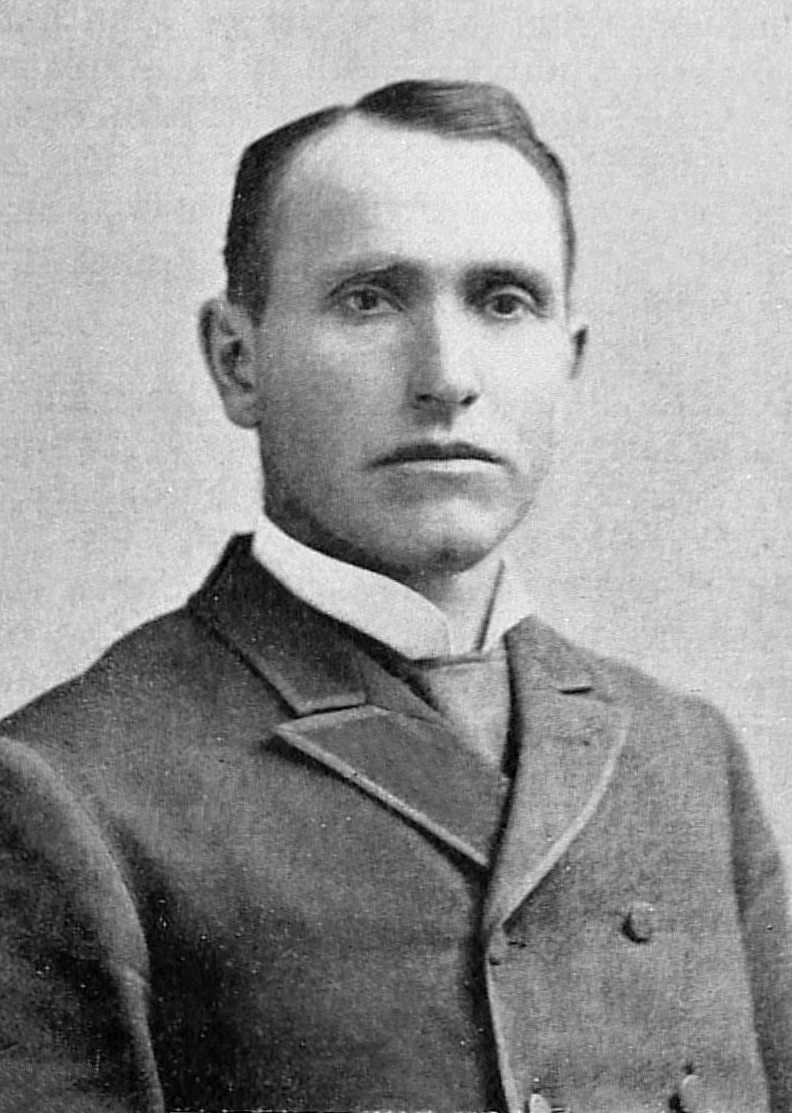
From 1894's Men of Vermont Illustrated.

Coolidge was born in Plymouth, Vermont, on March 31, 1845, the son of Calvin Galusha Coolidge and Sarah Coolidge. Calvin G. Coolidge was a farmer, and also served in the Vermont House of Representatives. John Coolidge graduated from Black River Academy, and served in Vermont during the American Civil War as commander of the state militia's Company K, 10th Regiment with the rank of captain.

Early in his life, Coolidge worked as a woodcutter and wheelwright. He was later active in several occupations; a partial list includes farmer, blacksmith, bricklayer, mason, carriage maker, harness maker, teacher, store owner, and insurance broker. In addition, he was a vice president of the Ludlow Savings Bank & Trust Company, and was appointed to its board of directors. Coolidge also served on the Black River Academy board of trustees.

A Republican, Coolidge served in the Vermont House of Representatives from 1872 to 1878. He held local offices throughout his life, including town selectboard member, town meeting moderator, town agent, tax collector, road commissioner, school superintendent, justice of the peace, and notary public. For several years, he was Plymouth's assistant postmaster, with a long running joke in the town being that Coolidge held this position because he was the only person in Plymouth who knew how to complete the forms required when submitting the post office's annual report to the main office in Washington, DC. For nearly 40 years he was both a town constable and deputy sheriff of Windsor County.

During the 1900 to 1902 governorship of William W. Stickney, who was related to the Coolidge family, John Coolidge served on his military staff as aide-de-camp with the rank of colonel.

Coolidge served in the Vermont Senate from 1910 to 1912. During his Senate term, Coolidge was chairman of the Committee on Land Taxes.

== Inaugurating his son ==
Upon hearing the death of President Warren G. Harding the previous day, Coolidge, who was a Vermont justice of the peace and a notary public, administered the presidential oath of office to his son at the Coolidge Homestead in Plymouth Notch, Vermont, at about 2:30 a.m. on August 3, 1923.

== Death ==
John Calvin Coolidge Sr. died in Plymouth, Vermont on March 18, 1926, thirteen days before his 81st birthday. He was buried at Plymouth Notch Cemetery.

== Family ==
In 1868, Coolidge married Victoria Josephine Moor (born 1846). They were the parents of two children, son Calvin, and daughter Abigail (1875–1890). Victoria died in 1885, aged 39.

Coolidge married Caroline Athelia Brown (1857–1920) on September 9, 1891.

== Sources ==
=== Books ===
- American Leaders, 1789–1994: A Biographical Summary. Washington, DC: Congressional Quarterly. 1994. pp. 15, 28. ISBN 9780871878410.
- Child, Hamilton (1881). Gazetteer and Business Directory of Windsor County, Vt., for 1883–84. Vol. 1. Syracuse, NY: Syracuse Journal. p. 426.
- Coolidge, Emma Downing (1930). Descendants of John and Mary Coolidge of Watertown, Massachusetts, 1630. Boston, MA: Wright & Potter Printing Company. p. 170.
- Orton, Vrest (1981). Calvin Coolidge's Unique Vermont Inauguration. Rutland, VT: Academy Books. p. 95. ISBN 9780914960317.
- Fuess, Claude Moore (1939). Calvin Coolidge - The Man from Vermont. Andover, MA: Fuess Press. p. 6. ISBN 9781446549049.
- News and Notes: A Monthly Newsletter Issued by the Vermont Historical Society. Vol. 16–20. Montpelier, VT: Vermont Historical Society. 1964. p. 71.
- Ullery, Jacob G. (1894). Men of Vermont Illustrated. Brattleboro, VT: Transcript Publishing Company. p. 80.
- Vermont Department of Banking and Insurance (1920). Annual Report of the Bank Commissioner of the State of Vermont. Rutland, VT: Tuttle Company. p. 149.
- Vermont General Assembly (1868). Vermont Legislative Documents and Official Reports. Montpelier, VT: Poland's Steam Printing Establishment. p. 34.
- Vermont Historical Society (1995). A Guide to the Coolidge Family Papers, 1802–1932 (PDF). Montpelier, VT: Vermont Historical Society. p. 6.
- Vermont State Officers Reports for 1901–1902. Albany, NY: J. B. Lyon Company. 1902. p. 75.
- Vermont State Senate (1910). Journal of the Senate of the State of Vermont. Montpelier, VT: Capital City Press. pp. 5, 18.
- Vermont State Senate (1917). Journal of the Senate of the State of Vermont. Montpelier, VT: Vermont General Assembly. p. 808.

=== Internet ===
- "Vermont Death Records 1909–2008, Entry for Carrie Brown Coolidge". Ancestry.com. Provo, UT: Ancestry.com, LLC.
- "Vermont Death Records 1909–2008, Entry for John Calvin Coolidge". Ancestry.com. Provo, UT: Ancestry.com, LLC.

=== Newspapers ===
- "Coolidge to Work in the Hay Field to Secure "Rest"". New Bern Sun Journal. New Bern, NC. July 9, 1920. p. 3.
- "Son's Rise to Presidency Placed Picturesque Colonel Before Public". Asbury Park Evening Press. Asbury Park, NJ. Associated Press. March 19, 1926. p. 10.
- "Colonel Coolidge Dies". Cornell Daily Sun. Ithaca, NY. Associated Press. March 19, 1926.
- Case, Stacey (July 4, 1999). "Coolidge: Son Returns to Plymouth Notch". Burlington Free Press. Burlington, VT. p. 7A.
