= Plymouth Historic District (Plymouth, Vermont) =

Historic district in Vermont, United States

- U.S. National Register of Historic Places
- U.S. Historic district
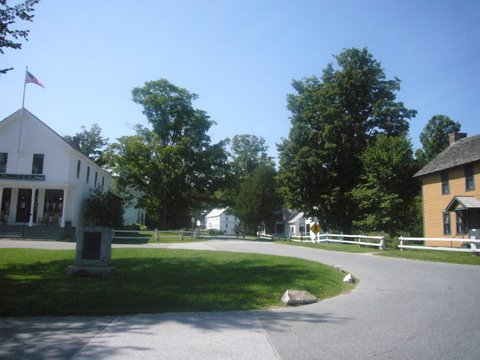
- Plymouth Notch village

- Location within Vermont Location within the United States
- Location: VT 100A, Plymouth, Vermont
- Coordinates: 43°32′30″N 72°42′51″W
- Area: 2,624 acres (1,062 ha)
- Architectural style: Colonial, Cape Cod
- NRHP reference No.: 70000084
- Added to NRHP: December 12, 1970

The Plymouth Historic District encompasses the village environment and surrounding landscape of Plymouth Notch, Vermont, the birthplace and historic homestead of United States President Calvin Coolidge. It includes more than 2,000 acres (810 ha), including the entire bowl-shaped valley where the village is located. It was listed on the National Register of Historic Places in 1970. The village itself, now a Vermont state park, was designated a National Historic Landmark District in 1965.

== Description and history ==
The Plymouth Notch village is located in a small bowl in the Green Mountains of central Vermont, just east of the junction of Vermont Routes 100 and 100A. The bowl is bounded on the north by Wood Peak, the east by East Mountain, the south by Blueberry Hill and Soltudus Mountain, and the west by Mount Tom. It is traversed primarily by the waters of Pinney Hollow Brook, which rises from the hills surrounding the village and is a tributary of the Ottauquechee River. The eponymous notch is just west of the village, separating it from the valley carrying the Black River. The hills surrounding the lowlands of the bowl are all wooded, while the bottomlands are now a combination of open fields and woods. The village of Plymouth Notch is located at a bend in Vermont Route 100A, which passes to its south and east, roughly paralleling Pinney Hollow Brook.

The village of Plymouth Notch was settled by members of the Coolidge family early in its history, and is where Calvin Coolidge was born in 1872. It retained its rural 19th-century character well into the 20th century, and in the 1960s efforts were made to preserve this environment, resulting in the creation of a state park dedicated to Coolidge and the village environment. The park includes Coolidge's birthplace, adult home, and the church where he worshipped.

== See also ==
- National Register of Historic Places listings in Windsor County, Vermont
