= Josiah Coolidge House =

Historic house in Massachusetts, United States

- U.S. National Register of Historic Places
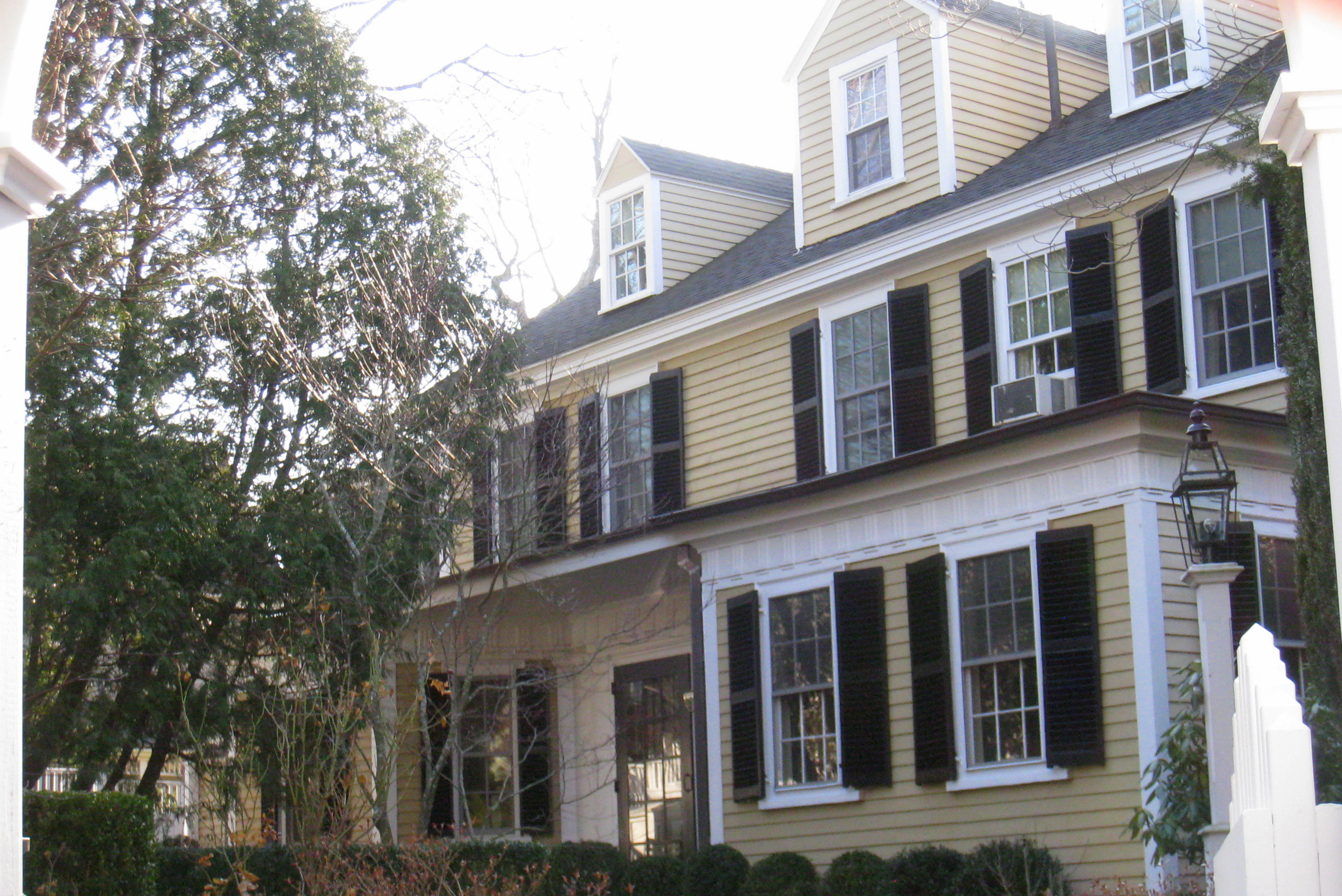

- Location within Massachusetts Location within the United States
- Location: Cambridge, Massachusetts
- Coordinates: 42°22′27″N 71°8′18″W
- Built: 1822
- Architectural style: Federal
- MPS: Cambridge MRA
- NRHP reference No.: 83000795
- Added to NRHP: June 30, 1983

The Josiah Coolidge House is an historic house at 24 Coolidge Hill Road in Cambridge, Massachusetts. Located on a drumlin overlooking the Charles River, this architecturally eclectic house was built in the 1820s, and was the farmhouse of the last working farm in the city. The farmlands were developed around the turn of the 20th century, and the house underwent significant alterations around 1900. In its present configuration it is 2 1/2 stories in height and five bays wide, with a jerkin-headed side gable roof pierced by gable dormers, and projecting sections (left one angled, right one squared) under a flat roof.

The house was listed on the National Register of Historic Places in 1983.

== See also ==
- National Register of Historic Places listings in Cambridge, Massachusetts
