= Achsa W. Sprague =

American spiritualist

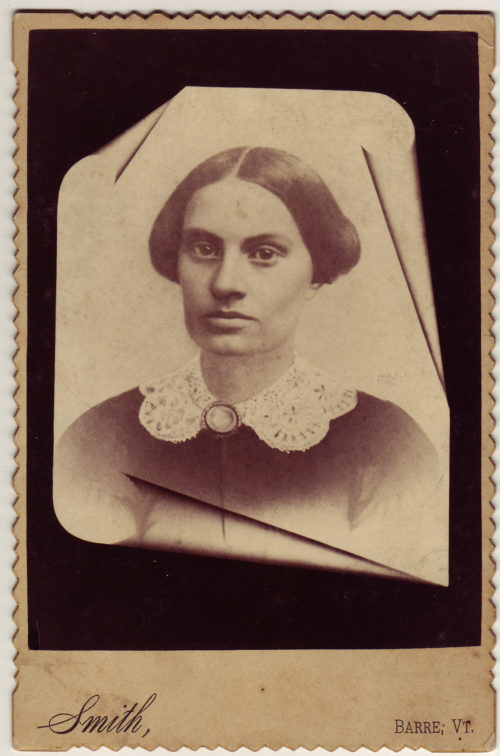
- Born: November 17, 1827
- Died: July 6, 1862 (aged 34)

Achsa W. Sprague (November 17, 1827 – July 6, 1862) was one of the best-known spiritualists during the 1850s in the United States. Primarily a medium and trance lecturer, she also wrote articles and poetry for spiritualist publications such as the Banner of Light, the Green Mountain Sibyl, and the People's World.

== Biography ==
Sprague was born in Plymouth Notch, Vermont. An able student, she began teaching other children at age 12. In 1847, at the age of 20, she became ill with rheumatic fever and credited her eventual recovery in 1854 to intercession by spirits. Between 1854 and her death in 1862 she traveled about the United States and Canada, entering into trances before audiences and speaking with the voices of alleged spirits. Like most spiritualists of the time, she was an abolitionist and an advocate of women's rights. Sprague's papers are archived in the library of the Vermont Historical Society.
