= Calvin Coolidge House =

House of Former President Calvin Coolidge

- U.S. National Register of Historic Places
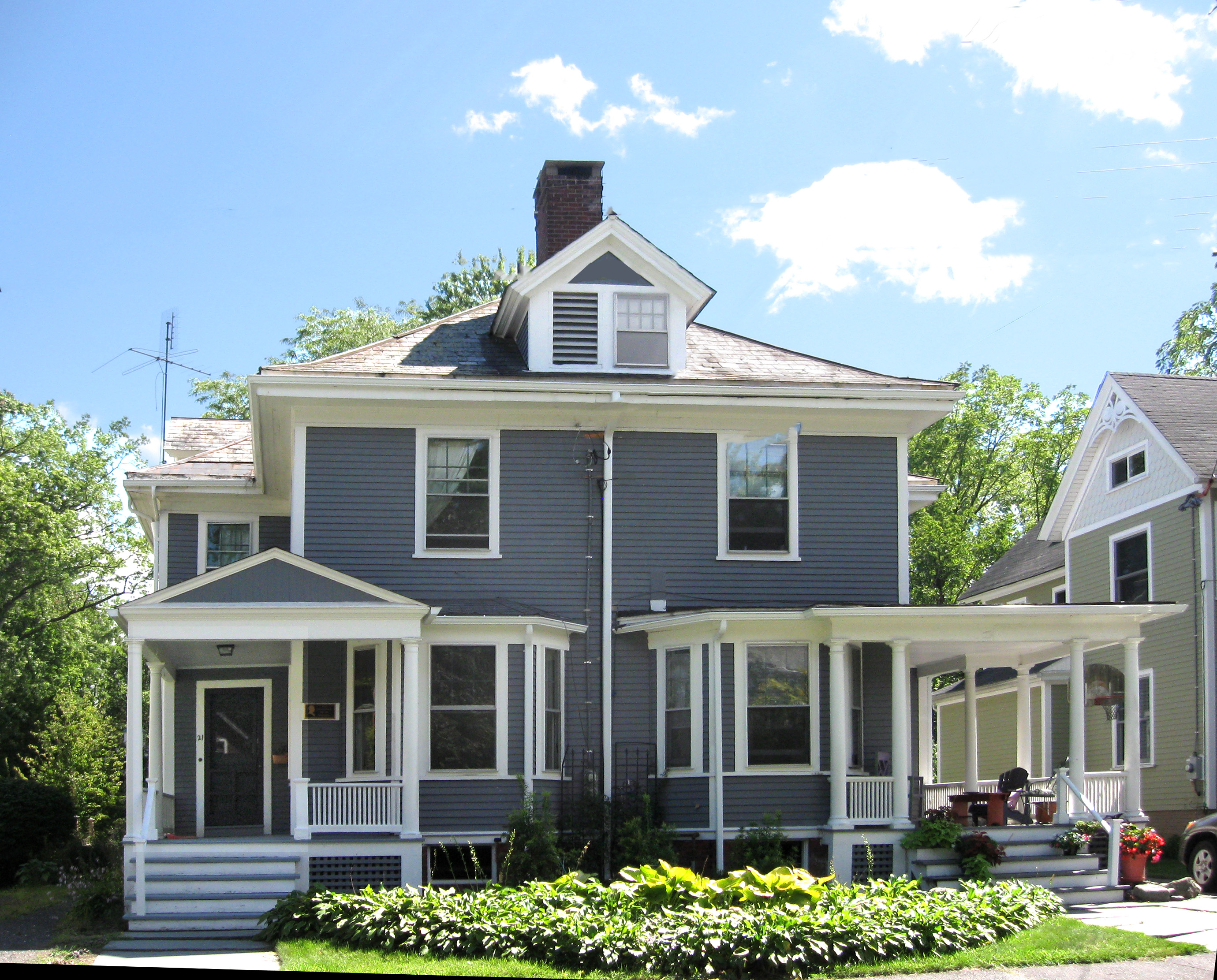
- Calvin Coolidge House, September 2012

- Location within Massachusetts Location within the United States
- Location: 19-21 Massasoit St., Northampton, Massachusetts
- Coordinates: 42°19′29″N 72°38′49″W
- Area: less than one acre
- Built: 1900-1901
- Architect: J.W. O'Brian
- NRHP reference No.: 76000262
- Added to NRHP: December 12, 1976

The Calvin Coolidge House is a historic house located at 19-21 Massasoit Street in Northampton, Massachusetts. Built in 1901, it is most historically significant as the home of the 30th president of the United States, Calvin Coolidge between 1906 and 1930, the height of his political career. It was listed on the National Register of Historic Places on December 12, 1976.

== Description and history ==
The Calvin Coolidge House is located in a quiet residential area west of downtown Northampton, on the east side of Massasoit Street near its junction with Arlington Street. It is an architecturally undistinguished 2 1/2-story two-family wood-frame structure, with a hip roof and clapboarded exterior. Stylistically it is basically Colonial Revival, with projecting sections to the rear of each unit, and different porch treatments on each side. The Coolidge unit, on the left, has a gable-roofed porch supported by round columns, extending partly in front of a project polygonal bay window. The interior also has some Colonial Revival features, including a fireplace in the front parlor with flanking Doric pilasters.

The house was built in 1900–01 by J.W. O'Brian, and its left side was rented in 1905 by Calvin Coolidge. The Coolidges occupied that unit until 1930. This period of occupancy coincides with Coolidge's political rise from the city council to Governor of Massachusetts, then Vice President and President. This property is one of the most unusual of those occupied by a US president on a long-term basis, in that he did not own it, and that it was a duplex. In 1930, Coolidge moved to "The Beeches" at 16 Hampton Terrace in Northampton, a move he said was necessitated by the increasing number of tourists coming to this address and the attendant lack of privacy.

== See also ==
- Coolidge Homestead, his birthplace
- Calvin Coolidge Bridge, carrying Route 9 between Northampton and Hadley
- List of residences of presidents of the United States
- National Register of Historic Places listings in Hampshire County, Massachusetts
- Presidential memorials in the United States
