= Plymouth Notch Cemetery =

Cemetery in Windsor County, Vermont

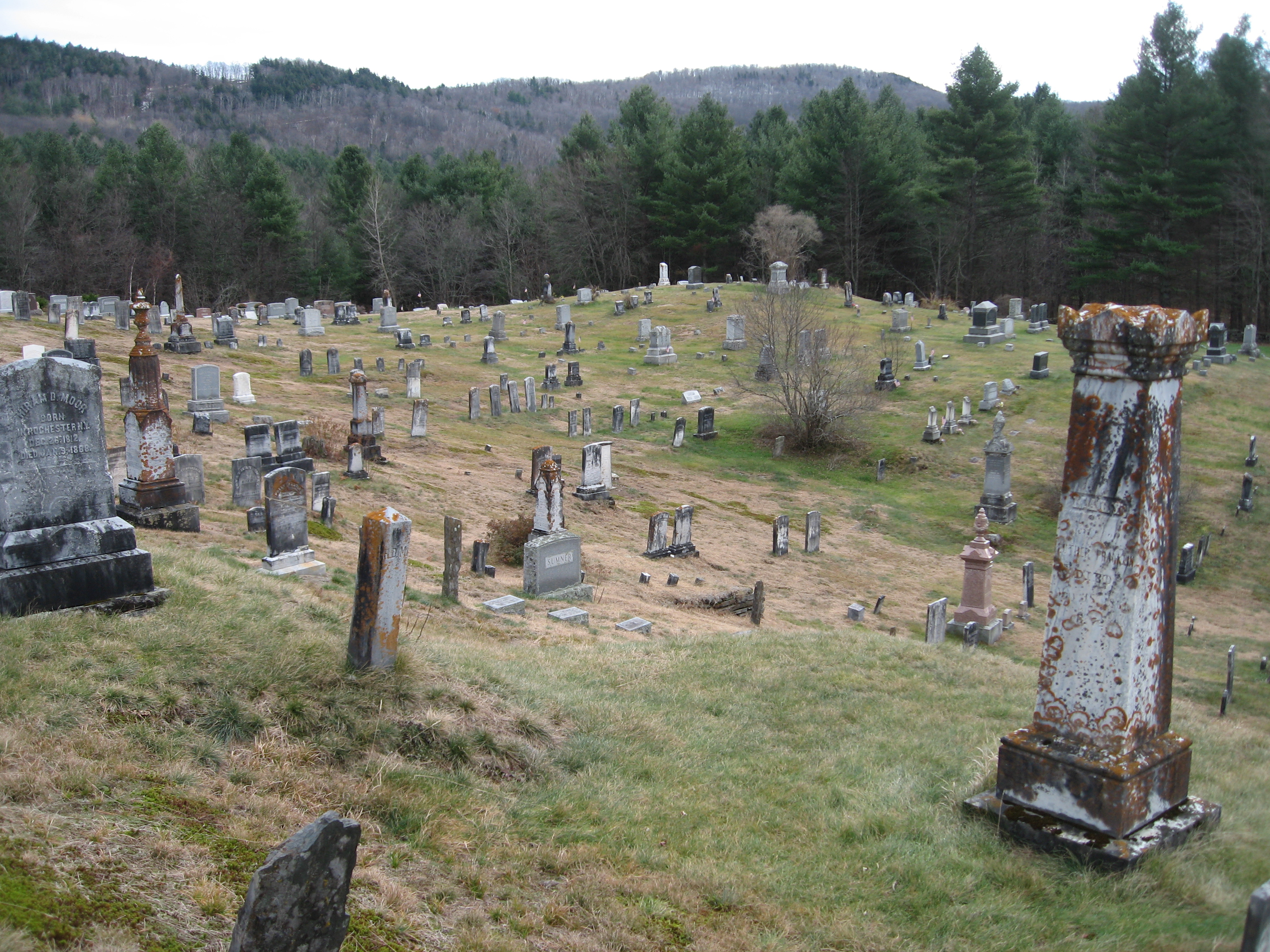
- Interactive map of Plymouth Notch Cemetery

Details
- Established: pre-1800
- Location: Plymouth Notch, Vermont
- Country: United States
- Coordinates: 43°31′52″N 72°43′24″W
- Type: Historic site
- Owned by: town of Plymouth
- No. of graves: ~1,000
- Website: President Calvin Coolidge Historic Site
- Find a Grave: Plymouth Notch Cemetery

The Plymouth Notch Cemetery is an historic cemetery in Plymouth Notch, Vermont, United States. It is noted as the burial place for 30th President of the United States Calvin Coolidge, as well as his wife Grace, children (Calvin Coolidge, Jr. 1908–1924, John Coolidge 1906–2000), and other members of the Coolidge family.

Other notable burials include Howard E. Armstrong, who served as Secretary of State of Vermont from 1949 to 1965, and abolitionist Achsa W. Sprague.

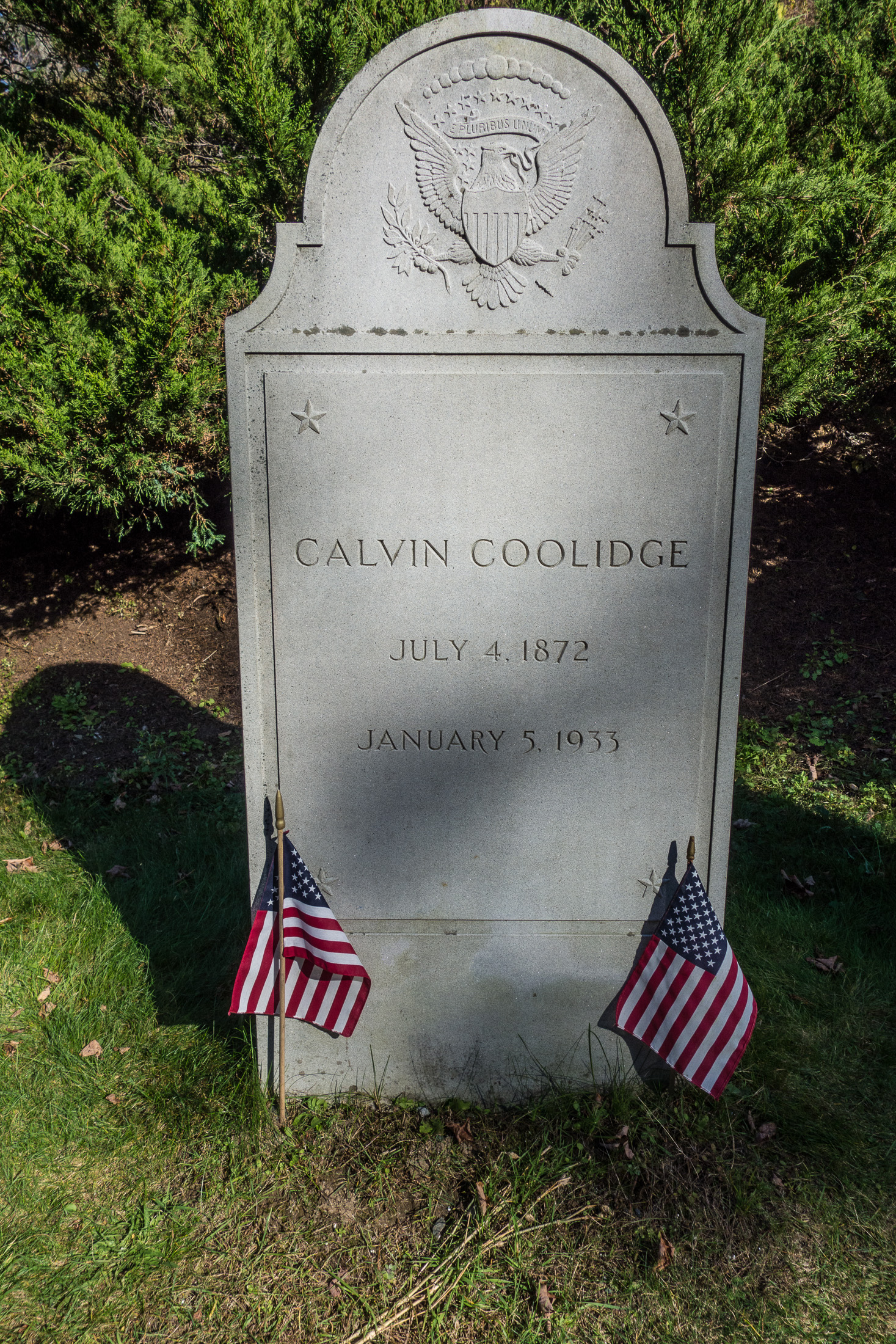
The gravestone of Calvin Coolidge in the Plymouth Notch Cemetery.

== See also ==
- List of burial places of presidents and vice presidents of the United States
