= Plymouth Notch, Vermont =

Village in Vermont, United States

Coordinates: 43.5299°N 72.7388°W

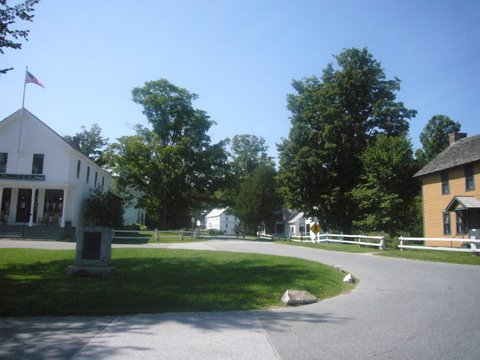
Plymouth Notch, Vermont. Coolidge was born in the rear of the general store in the foreground and the Coolidges' still operative cheese company is in the background

Plymouth Notch is an unincorporated community in the town of Plymouth, Windsor County, Vermont, United States. All or most of the village is included in the Calvin Coolidge Homestead District, a National Historic Landmark.

== History ==
John Calvin Coolidge, Sr., the father of Calvin Coolidge, was Justice of the Peace in this town and Coolidge was sworn in here as president, almost immediately upon the death of his predecessor, Warren G. Harding, who died suddenly in 1923. President Coolidge is buried in Notch Cemetery, along with seven generations of Coolidges.

In addition to the museum buildings, the village contains a restaurant, general store, and a still operative cheese factory founded by the Coolidge family in 1890.
