= Niels Petersen =

Niels Petersen may refer to:

- Niels Petersen (gymnast) (1885–1961), Danish Olympic gymnast
- Niels Helveg Petersen (1939–2017), Danish politician
- Niels Petersen (sport shooter) (born 1932), Danish former sport shooter
- Niels Petersen (weightlifter) (born 1918), Danish weightlifter
- Niels Petersen (1845–1923), Danish pioneer of the town of Tempe, Arizona and owner of the historic Niels Petersen House
