= Phoenix Carnegie Library and Library Park =

- U.S. National Register of Historic Places
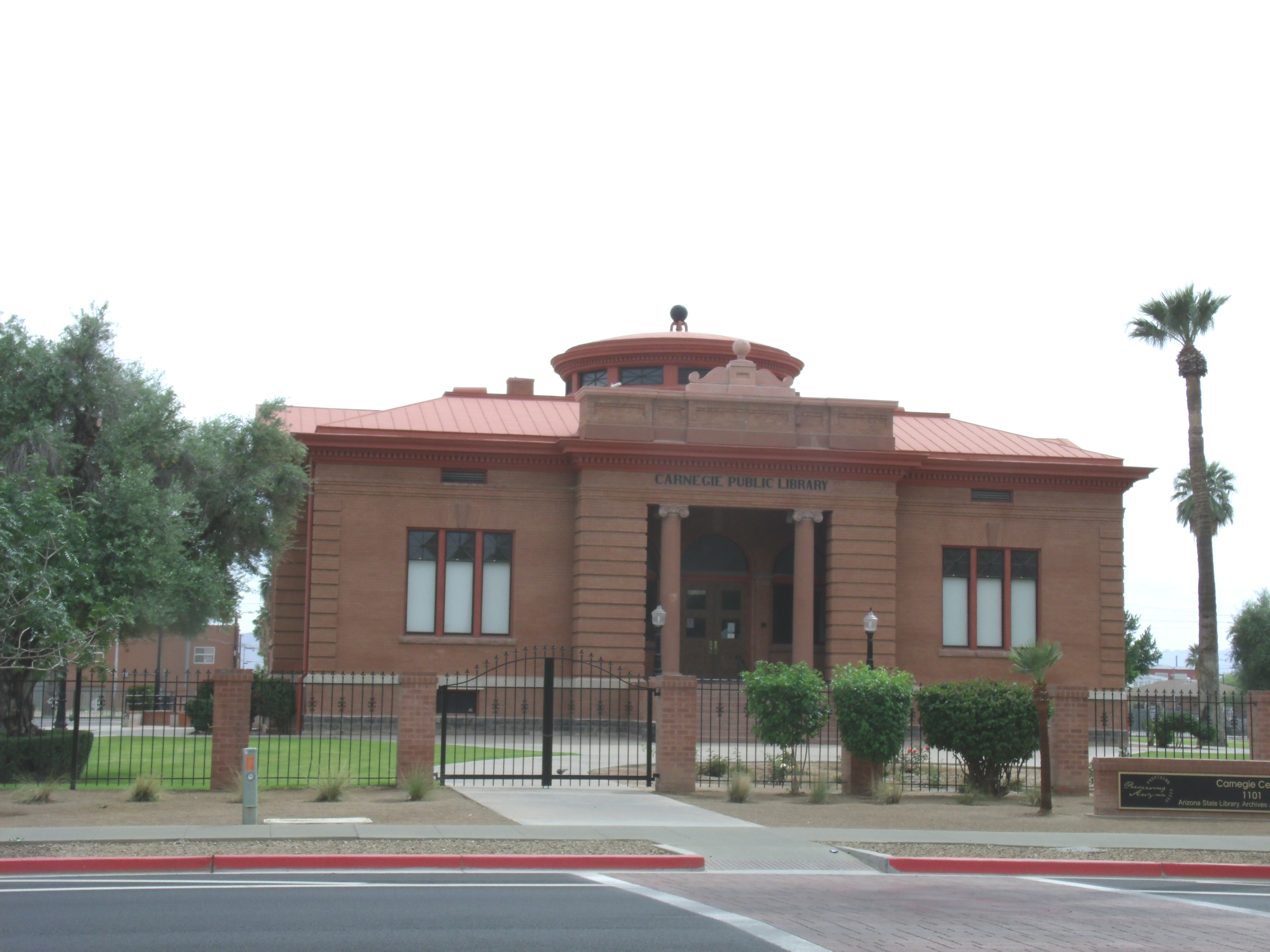

- Location within Arizona Location within the United States
- Location: 1101 W. Washington St., Phoenix, Arizona
- Coordinates: 33°26′51″N 112°5′10″W
- Area: 4 acres (1.6 ha)
- Built: 1908
- Architect: Millard & Creighton; William R. Norton; Reeves & Baillie
- NRHP reference No.: 74000456
- Added to NRHP: November 19, 1974

The Phoenix Carnegie Library and Library Park, now known as the Carnegie Center, is a historic site in Phoenix, Arizona. Completed in 1908, it was listed on the National Register of Historic Places in 1974.

== Background ==
The first Phoenix public library opened in the spring of 1898 thanks to the efforts of the Friday Club, whose members collected books and secured two rooms on the second floor of the Fleming Block, one of the largest office buildings in downtown Phoenix. This venture was so well received that the following spring, the Phoenix Library Association was formed and the expanded library moved into a room in Phoenix City Hall which had been vacated by the legislative assembly, having moved to the new capitol building made the rooms available for other purposes. The books of the library were now for the first time catalogued by the Dewey system.

The success of the library made necessary a more permanent and structured arrangement, and the Library Association consequently endeavored to transfer the project to the city. However, this could not be accomplished until March 1901 after an amendment to the territorial statutes. At this time, the Phoenix Public Library was established, with 1350 volumes.

Since 1899 the Library Association had been unsuccessfully attempting to secure a grant from Andrew Carnegie, and in December 1901 the Phoenix Woman's Club joined the campaign. Some progress was made in March 1902 when the city agreed to put up the required 10% of the anticipated $25,000 grant and to levy an annual tax of 5 mills on the dollar. In June, the city agreed to furnish the site if the grant was received.

Negotiations with Carnegie hit a snag when he saw the 1900 census report giving Phoenix a population of 5500, and decided that a grant of $15,000 would be sufficient. However, by the fall of 1903 a committee had gathered evidence to show that additions of land and population to Phoenix since 1900 had resulted in a population of 14,000. The committee also pointed out that the nearest public libraries were in Tucson and Prescott, leaving the entire Salt River Valley in need of this public service. Carnegie was convinced and agreed to the original sum of $25,000.

== Construction ==
In July 1904, the city accepted this offer and set about selecting a suitable site. The first site chosen was on Central Avenue north of Van Buren Street, but the money for the lots had to be donated within 45 days and when this could not be accomplished, a second site was chosen. This site was known as Neahr's Park and covered two blocks on West Washington Street between 10th and 12th Avenues, halfway between the court house and the capitol. The land was donated to the city by Mr. Neahr. In the spring of 1905 the city approved the plans for the new building as drawn by Phoenix architect William R. Norton. William H. Reeves, of Reeves & Baillie, Peoria, Illinois, revised the plans at the request of the city council. A board of trustees was appointed in August. By 1906, the project had been turned over to Millard & Creighton, and plans were approved in April.

== Later history ==
The red brick building was completed and opened for business on February 14, 1908, and continued in use as a library until the new main library was built in 1952. Since that time it has been used for various purposes, including a recreation hall, social service center, storage facility, and a homeless shelter. In 1984, the building was restored at a cost of $1.3 million, and the state leased it from the city in 1985. In 1987, the building was reopened as the Arizona Hall of Fame Museum. Due to safety concerns, it was closed in 2001. It reopened in 2003 and has since been used as administrative and museum space for the Arizona State Library. It is home to the Arizona Women's Hall of Fame.
