= President's House (Tempe, Arizona) =

- U.S. National Register of Historic Places
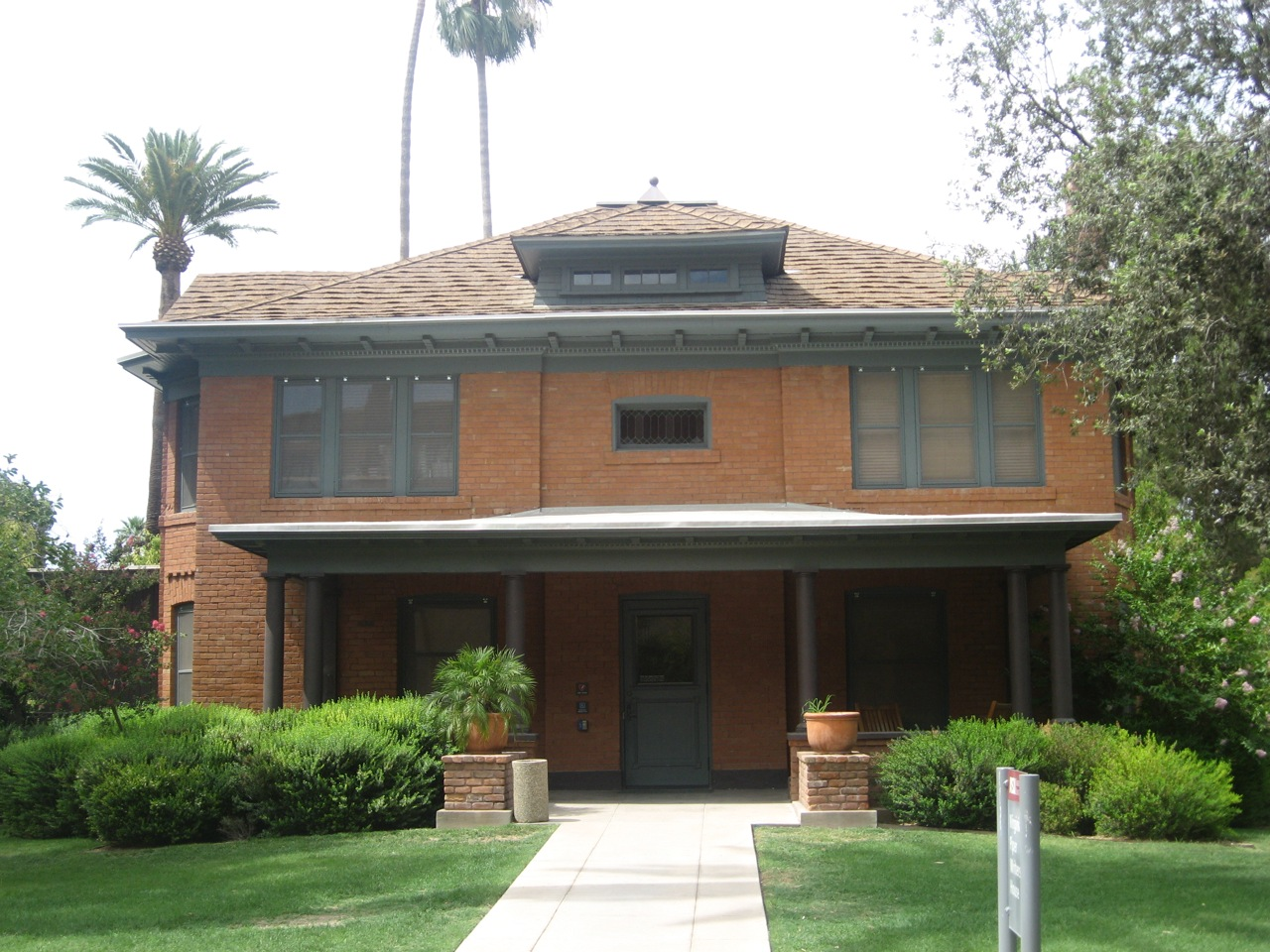

- Location within Arizona Location within the United States
- Location: ASU campus, Tempe, Arizona
- Coordinates: 33°25′13″N 111°55′56″W
- Area: less than one acre
- Built: 1907
- Architect: James M. Creighton; Campbell, Clinton
- Architectural style: Western Colonial
- MPS: Tempe MRA
- NRHP reference No.: 85000054
- Added to NRHP: January 7, 1985

The President's House is a building on the Tempe campus of Arizona State University. It was built in 1907 to serve as the lodgings for the president of what was then known as the Tempe Normal School. It was listed on the National Register of Historic Places in 1985 and currently houses the Virginia G. Piper Center for Creative Writing, known as the writer's house.

== History ==
The President's House was constructed in 1907 to house the university president, and two of the university's most famous presidents lived there: Dr. Arthur Matthews held the title from 1900 to 1930, while Grady Gammage was the university president from 1933 until 1959. These two presidents shaped the institution, and under Gammage, what was once a normal school became Arizona State University.

After 1959, upon Gammage's death, the building was no longer used as the home of the president. It was occupied by the Alumni House, alumni offices, and later by the University Archives, and it currently houses the Virginia G. Piper Center for Creative Writing.

== Architecture ==
The President's House was the last known design from territorial architect James M. Creighton, who designed the now-demolished original Normal School buildings. It is also Creighton's lone surviving structure on campus.

The building is a two-story Western Colonial brick building with a copper shingle roof. The main house features a two-story bay window on the west and a two-story bay with fireplace on the east. The hipped roof features projecting gables and boxed eaves, while the double-hung windows have segmental arches.

In 1931, a bath and two rooms were added to the northwest corner; in 1937, the front porch was enclosed with casement windows.

Restoration work that concluded in 2005 restored the building to its original appearance, including the porch, brick exterior and roof. Most interior finishes are original, with minor accommodations to meet the standards of the Americans with Disabilities Act.
