= 10046 Creighton =

Main-belt asteroid

Discovery
- Discovered by: INAS
- Discovery site: Palomar Obs.
- Discovery date: 2 May 1986

Designations
- Named after: James M. Creighton (American architect)
- Alternative designations: 1986 JC · 1986 LD; 1990 KH_{2} · 1990 SJ_{10}
- Minor planet category: main-belt · (inner) background

Orbital characteristics
- Epoch 23 March 2018 (JD 2458200.5)
- Uncertainty parameter 0
- Observation arc: 63.74 yr (23,280 d)
- Aphelion: 2.8999 AU
- Perihelion: 1.7791 AU
- Semi-major axis: 2.3395 AU
- Eccentricity: 0.2396
- Orbital period (sidereal): 3.58 yr (1,307 d)
- Mean anomaly: 297.13°
- Mean motion: 0° 16^{m} 31.44^{s} / day
- Inclination: 8.3234°
- Longitude of ascending node: 101.68°
- Argument of perihelion: 176.98°

Physical characteristics
- Mean diameter: 9.80±2.58 km 10.00±0.67 km 10.428±0.207 km 11.15±2.45 km 12.40 km (derived)
- Synodic rotation period: 6.566±0.002 h (Note: Skiff (2011) web: rotation period 6.566±0.002 hours with a brightness amplitude of 0.68 mag. Summary figures at the LCDB.); 6.567±0.0036 h 6.5698±0.0002 h
- Geometric albedo: 0.0417 (derived); 0.05±0.01; 0.052±0.038; 0.07±0.04; 0.071±0.013
- Spectral type: X · C (Note: Search for Unusual Spectroscopic Candidates Among 40313 minor planets from the 3rd Release of the Sloan Digital Sky Survey Moving Object Catalog (publication). SDSS-MFB (Masi Foglia Binzel) taxonomy (catalog).)
- Absolute magnitude (H): 13.4; 13.50; 13.60; 13.637±0.009 (R); 13.73±0.32; 13.85

10046 Creighton, provisional designation 1986 JC, is a carbonaceous background asteroid from the inner regions of the asteroid belt, approximately 10 kilometers (6.2 miles) in diameter. It was discovered on 2 May 1986, by astronomers with the International Near-Earth Asteroid Survey (INAS) at Palomar Observatory, California, in the United States. The C-type asteroid has a rotation period of 6.57 hours. It was named after American architect James M. Creighton.

== Orbit and classification ==
Creighton is a non-family asteroid from the main belt's background population. It orbits the Sun in the inner main-belt at a distance of 1.8–2.9 AU once every 3 years and 7 months (1,307 days; semi-major axis of 2.34 AU). Its orbit has an eccentricity of 0.24 and an inclination of 8° with respect to the ecliptic. The body's observation arc begins with a precovery taken at the discovering observatory in July 1954, nearly 32 years prior to its official discovery observation.

== Physical characteristics ==
Creighton has been characterized as a common X-type asteroid by Pan-STARRS' photometric survey. It is also characterized as a dark C-type asteroid in the SDSS-MFB (Masi Foglia Binzel) taxonomy.

=== Rotation period ===
In April 2011, a rotational light-curve was obtained for this asteroid from photometric observations by American astronomer Brian Skiff. The light-curve gave a well-defined rotation period of 6.566±0.002 hours with a brightness variation of 0.68 in magnitude (U=3). Two other light-curves – obtained at the Palomar Transient Factory, California, in February 2014, and by astronomer Maurice Clark at Texas Tech's Preston Gott Observatory in June 2011 – are in agreement with a period of 6.5668±0.0036 and 6.5698±0.0002 hours, and an amplitude of 0.46 and 0.65, respectively (U=2/3-).

=== Diameter and albedo ===
According to the survey carried out by the NEOWISE mission of NASA's Wide-field Infrared Survey Explorer, Creighton measures between 9.80 and 11.15 kilometers in diameter and its surface has an albedo between 0.05 and 0.071.

The Collaborative Asteroid Lightcurve Link derives an albedo of 0.0417 and a diameter of 12.40 kilometers based on an absolute magnitude of 13.6.

== Naming ==
This minor planet was named after pioneering American architect James M. Creighton (1856–1946), who designed the Old Main building at Arizona State University, and designed and constructed the original road to the summit of Pikes Peak in Colorado. The official naming citation was published by the Minor Planet Center on 2 December 2009 (M.P.C. 67759).
