= James M. Creighton =

American architect (1856–1946)

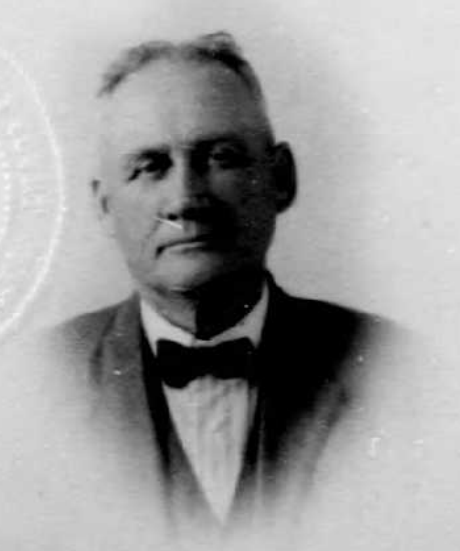
Creighton, from his 1922 passport application.

James Miller Creighton (September 14, 1856 – November 25, 1946) was an American architect who practiced in Phoenix, Arizona from the 1880s to the 1920s. He is considered to be one of Arizona's first architects.

== Early years ==
Creighton was born in Newcastle, New Brunswick, now Miramichi, in 1856. At the age of 13, Creighton began working as an apprentice, to learn carpentry and building. He remained in his native Canada until 1879, when he emigrated to Denver, Colorado. He worked for a local builder, and studied architecture at night school.

== Arizona ==
Interested in opportunities in Arizona, he moved, this time to Tucson. There, he formed a partnership with J. M. Henderson. in 1882 he moved on to Phoenix, hoping to get a job on the construction of the new Maricopa County Courthouse. Unsuccessful, he formed a partnership, Patton & Creighton, with Samuel E. Patton. Patton had been the successful bidder on the courthouse's carpentry.

Gradually, he focused more and more on design and less on building, and opened an office for the practice of architecture in late 1887, after obtaining the commission for City Hall. He practiced alone until the mid-1890s, when he added Denslow W. Millard, formerly of Minnesota, as a partner. The firm of Creighton & Millard only lasted until 1897, When Millard went on to establish his own practice. Circa 1898, he partnered with C. Schenstrom as Creighton & Schenstrom, and ended the partnership in 1899.

Around the turn of the century, Creighton moved to Birmingham, Alabama, in the face of a severe drought that limited opportunities. However, he soon returned to Phoenix. In 1905 he again partnered with Millard, this time as Millard & Creighton. The partnership lasted until 1907. That year, Creighton associated with Henry C. Trost of El Paso. The resulting firm, Trost & Creighton, was organized to supervise Trost's Arizona work. They dissolved partnership in 1908, when Trost established Trost & Trost. Creighton practiced alone until 1915, establishing Creighton & McDonald, but soon returned to private practice. He continued to practice under his own name until the mid-1920s.

== Later years ==
During the early 1880s, Creighton became a naturalized citizen. He married Mary E. Smith, in Phoenix. He became a widow in 1913 and later married Nellie Eliza, Mary's younger sister.

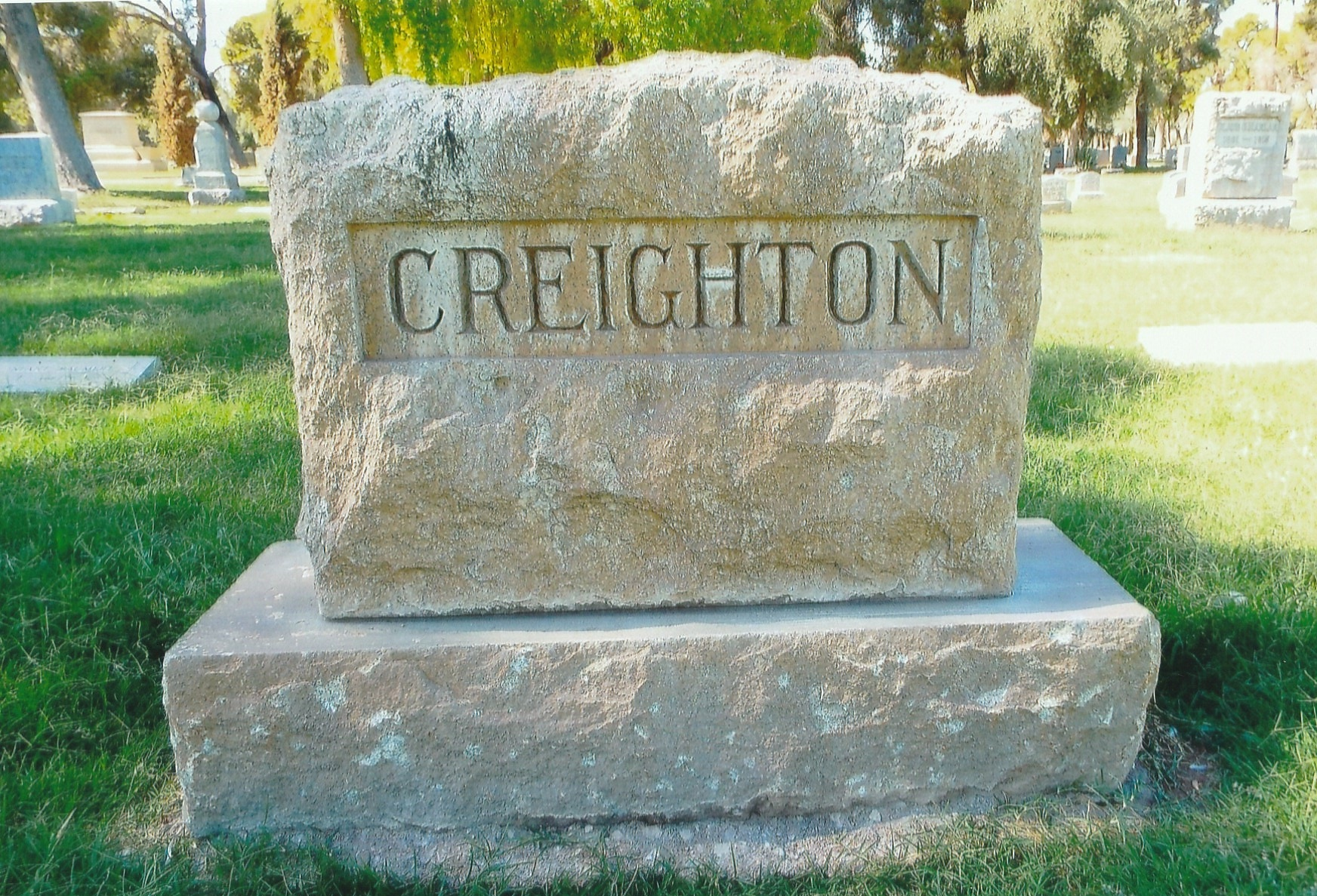
Creighton family plot

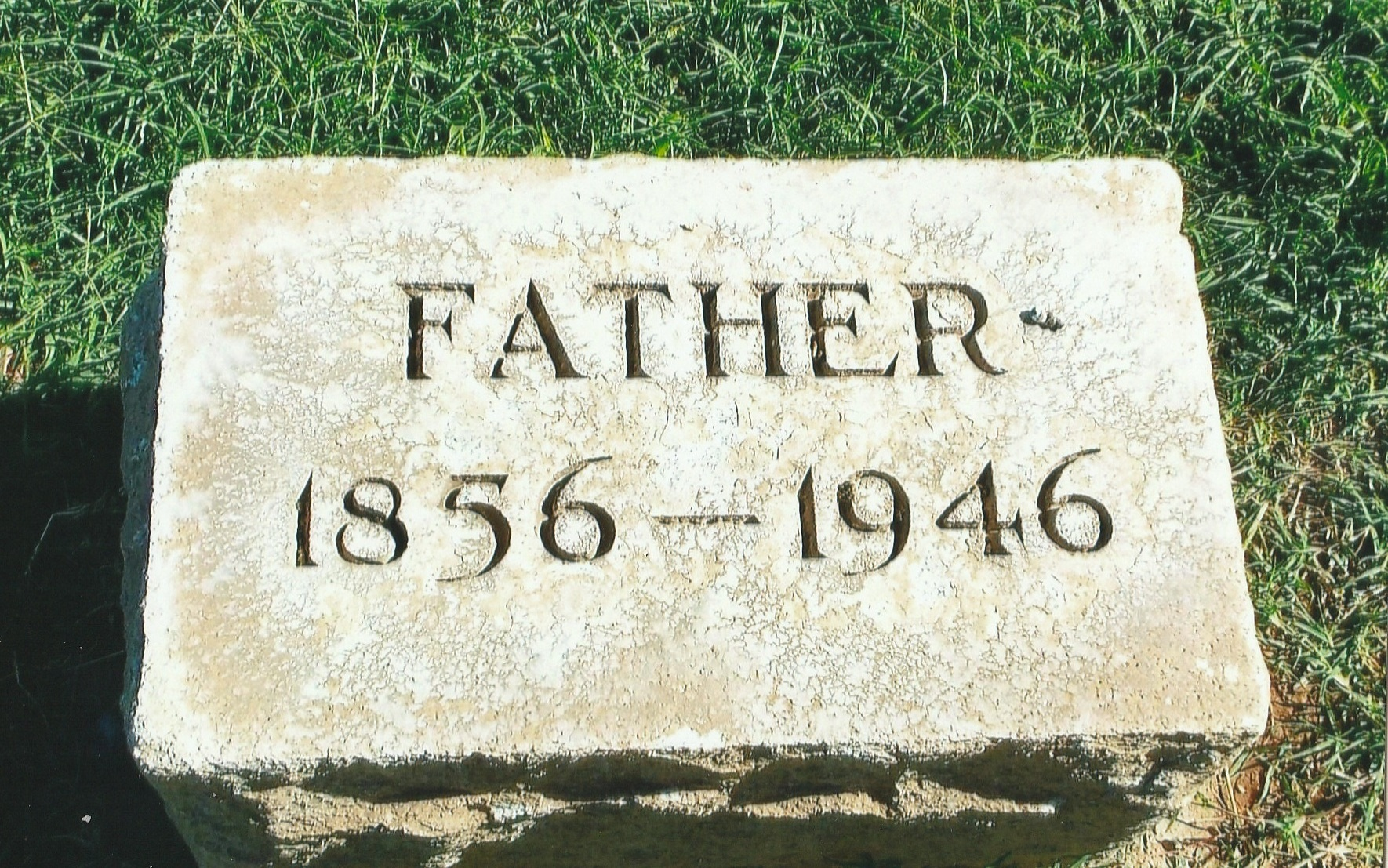
Grave of James Miller Creighton

Despite traveling extensively, he died at his home in Phoenix in 1946. Creighton is buried in Phoenix's Greenwood/Memory Lawn Mortuary & Cemetery. In 2009, the asteroid 10046 Creighton was named in his memory.

== Works ==
A number of his works are listed on the National Register of Historic Places.

Patton & Creighton, ?–1887:

- Fry Building, 146 E. Washington St., Phoenix (1885) – Altered. Also the oldest identified commercial building in Phoenix
- Territorial Insane Asylum, 2500 E. Van Buren St., Phoenix (1886–87) – From plans by an unidentified Californian firm
- Territorial Normal School, Tempe (1886) a.k.a. Old Main
- Old Main, University of Arizona, Tucson (1887–91)

James M. Creighton, 1887–?:

- Phoenix City Hall, 125 E. Washington St., Phoenix (1887–88) – Demolished c. 1928
- John Nicholas Saloon, 46 E. 11th St., Florence (1889)
- Andre Building, 401 S. Mill Ave., Tempe (1888) – Remodeled 1900
- Phoenix Indian School, 300 E. Indian School Rd., Phoenix (1891–92)
- Second Pinal County Courthouse, 135 N. Pinal St., Florence (1891)
- Osborn School, 3443 N. Central Ave., Phoenix (1892) – Demolished. Now the site of Phoenix Financial Center
- Niels Petersen House, 1414 W. Southern Ave., Tempe (1892)
- Frank Titus House, 1310 N. Hayden Rd., Scottsdale (1892)
- Con P. Cronin House, 2029 W. Jefferson St., Phoenix (1893)
- Oscar Roberts House, 2004 W. Madison St., Phoenix (1893)

Creighton & Millard, ?–1897:

- George J. Roskruge House, 318 E. 13th St., Tucson (1895)
- Hotel Adams, 50 E. Adams St., Phoenix (1896) – Burned
- Darius M. Purman House, 1317 W. Jefferson St., Phoenix (1897–98)

James M. Creighton, 1897–1898:

- Odd Fellows Hall, 520 S. Mill Ave., Tempe (1898)

Creighton & Schenstrom, 1898–1899:

- Ellingson Building, 21 W. Washington St., Phoenix (1899) – Demolished

James M. Creighton, 1899–1905:

- Vernetta Hotel, 216 N. Frontier St., Wickenburg (1905)

Millard & Creighton, 1905–1907:

- Dominion Hotel, Broad & Sycamore Sts., Globe (1905) – Burned 1981
- Carnegie Public Library, 1101 W. Washington St., Phoenix (1906–07)
- President's House, Tempe Normal School, Tempe (1907)

Trost & Creighton, 1907–1908:

- Y.M.C.A. Building, Monroe St. & 2nd Ave., Phoenix (1908) – Demolished

James M. Creighton, 1908–1915:

- Gold Hotel, 3rd & Washington Sts., Phoenix (1911–12) – Demolished
- Tempe City Hall, 140 E. 5th St., Tempe (1913–14) – Demolished 1968

Creighton & McDonald, 1915–?:

- Wilson School, 3025 E. Fillmore St., Phoenix (1915) – Demolished
- Suhwaro Hotel, 58 W. Buffalo St., Chandler (1916)

== Historic structures ==
The following are images of historical structures in whose development James M. Creighton played an instrumental role:

Historic structures

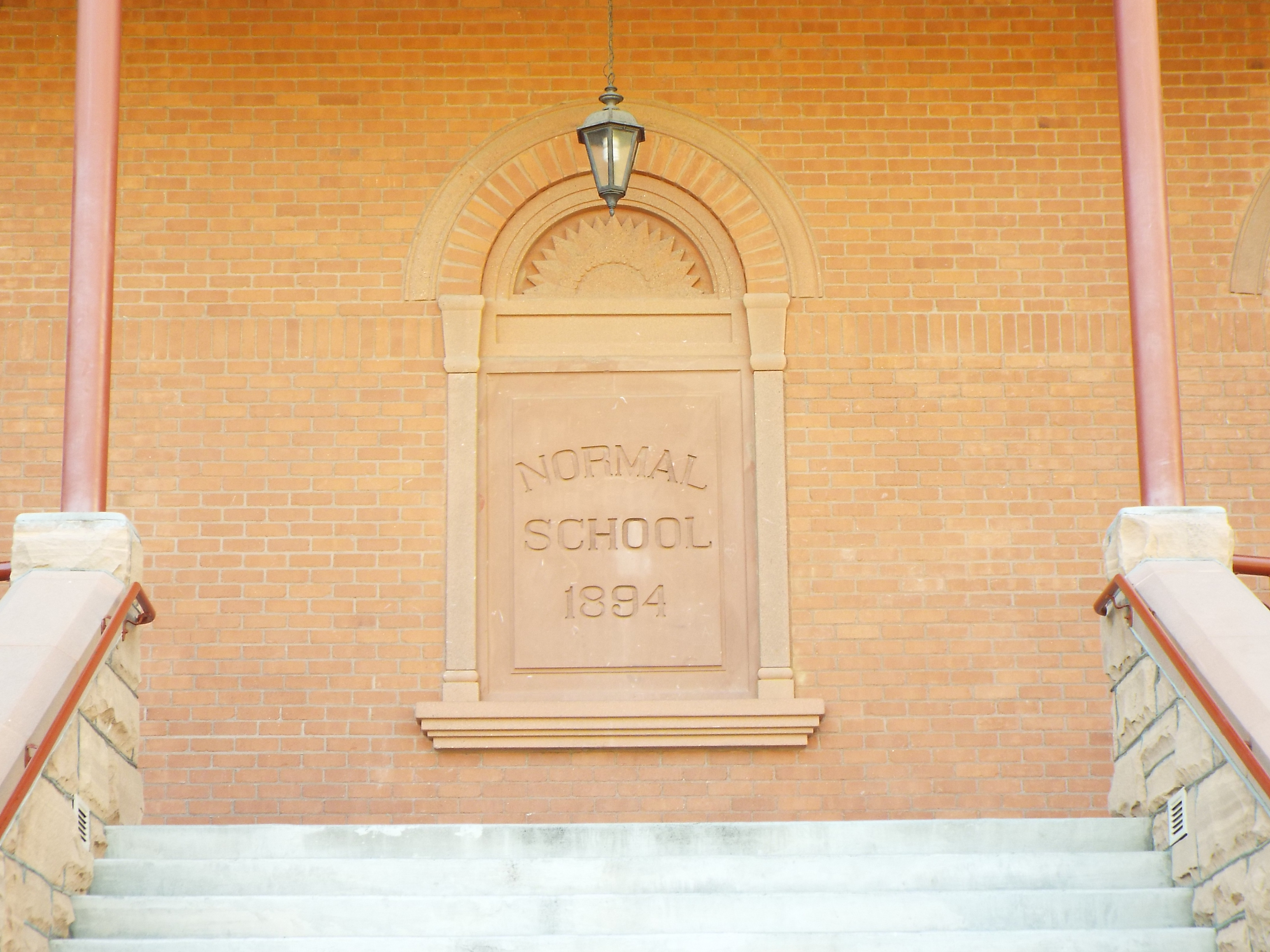
Plaque in the main entrance of the Main Building, also known as Old Main and the Normal School.

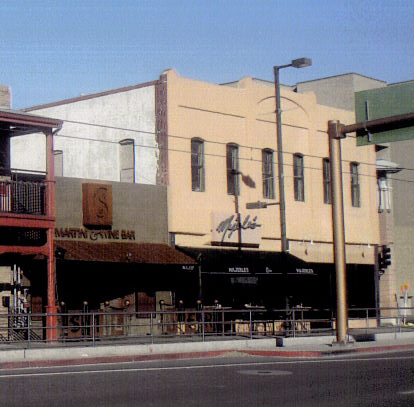
The Fry's Building – 1885

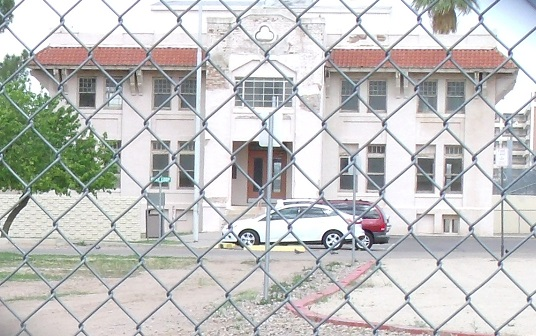
Arizona State Hospital Building (Territorial Insane Asylum) – 1900

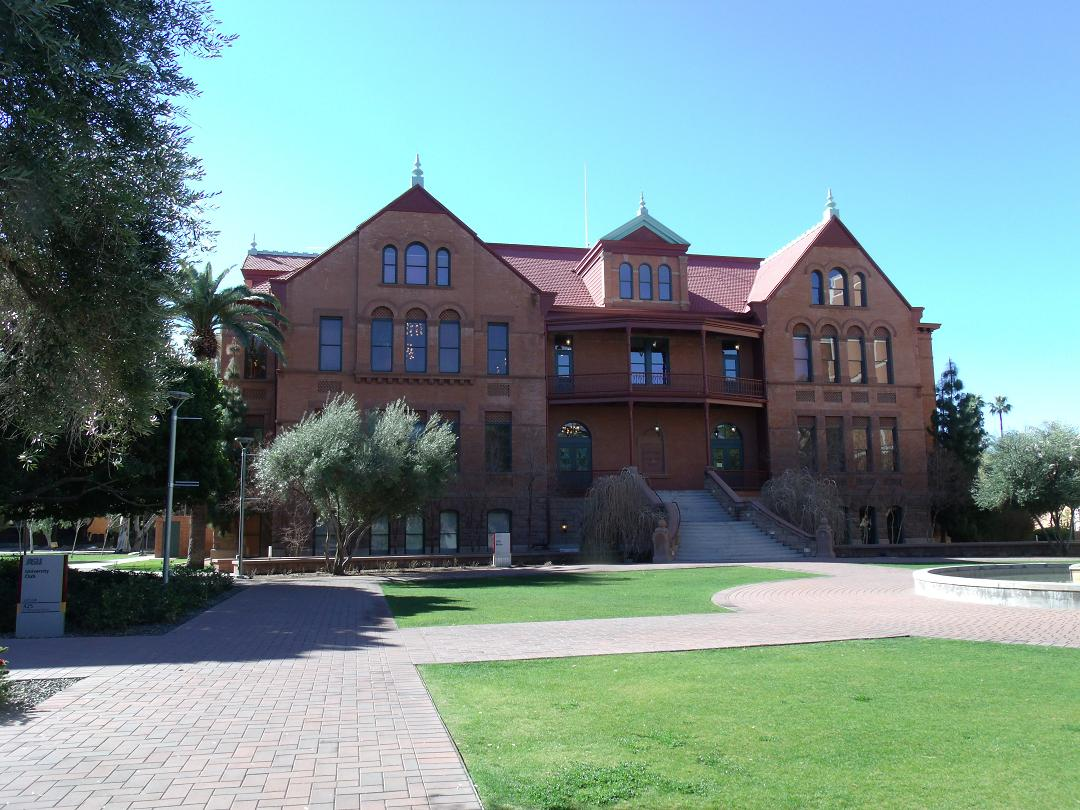
The Old Main building a.k.a. Tempe Normal School – 1889

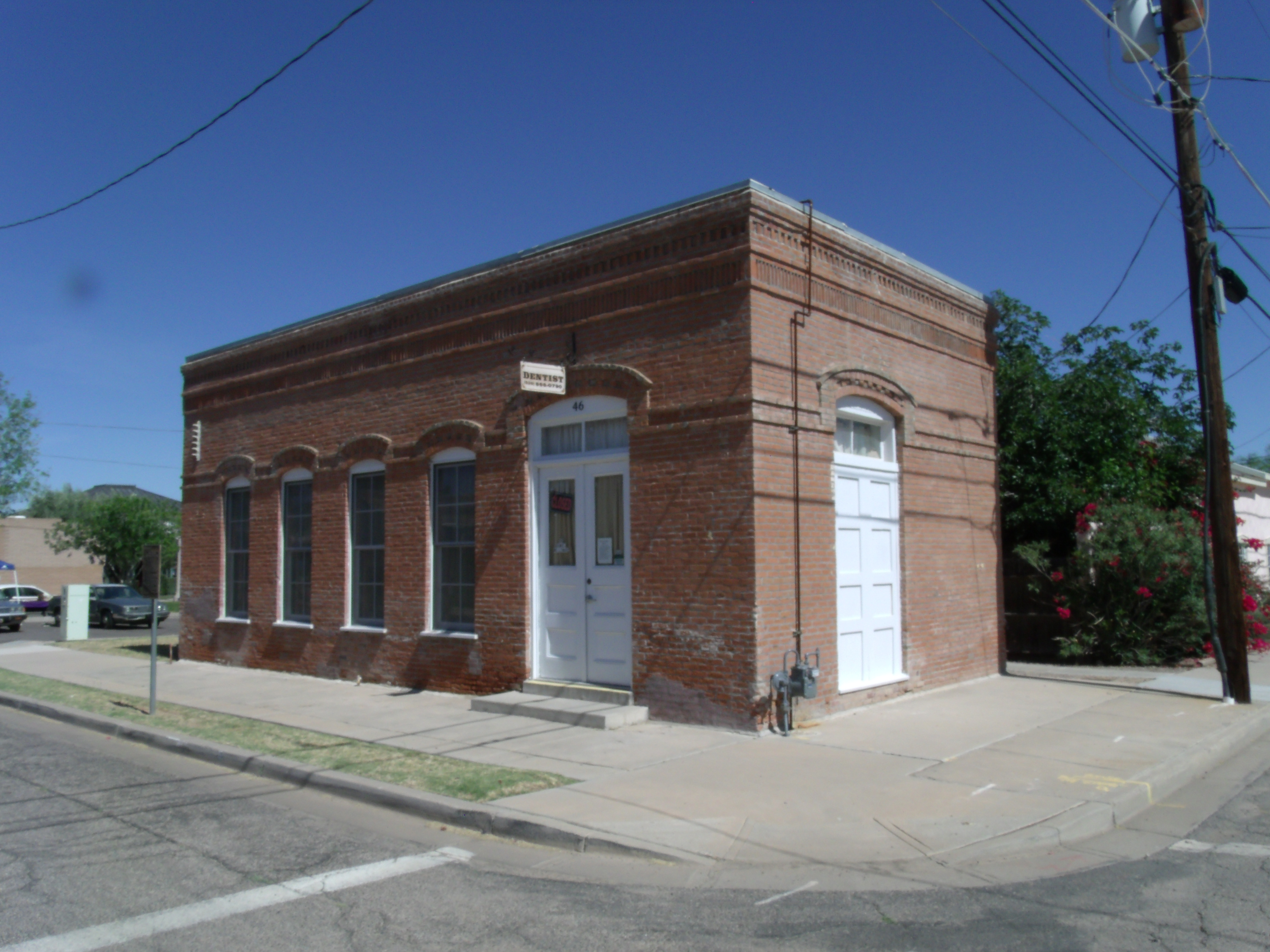
The John Nicolas Saloon

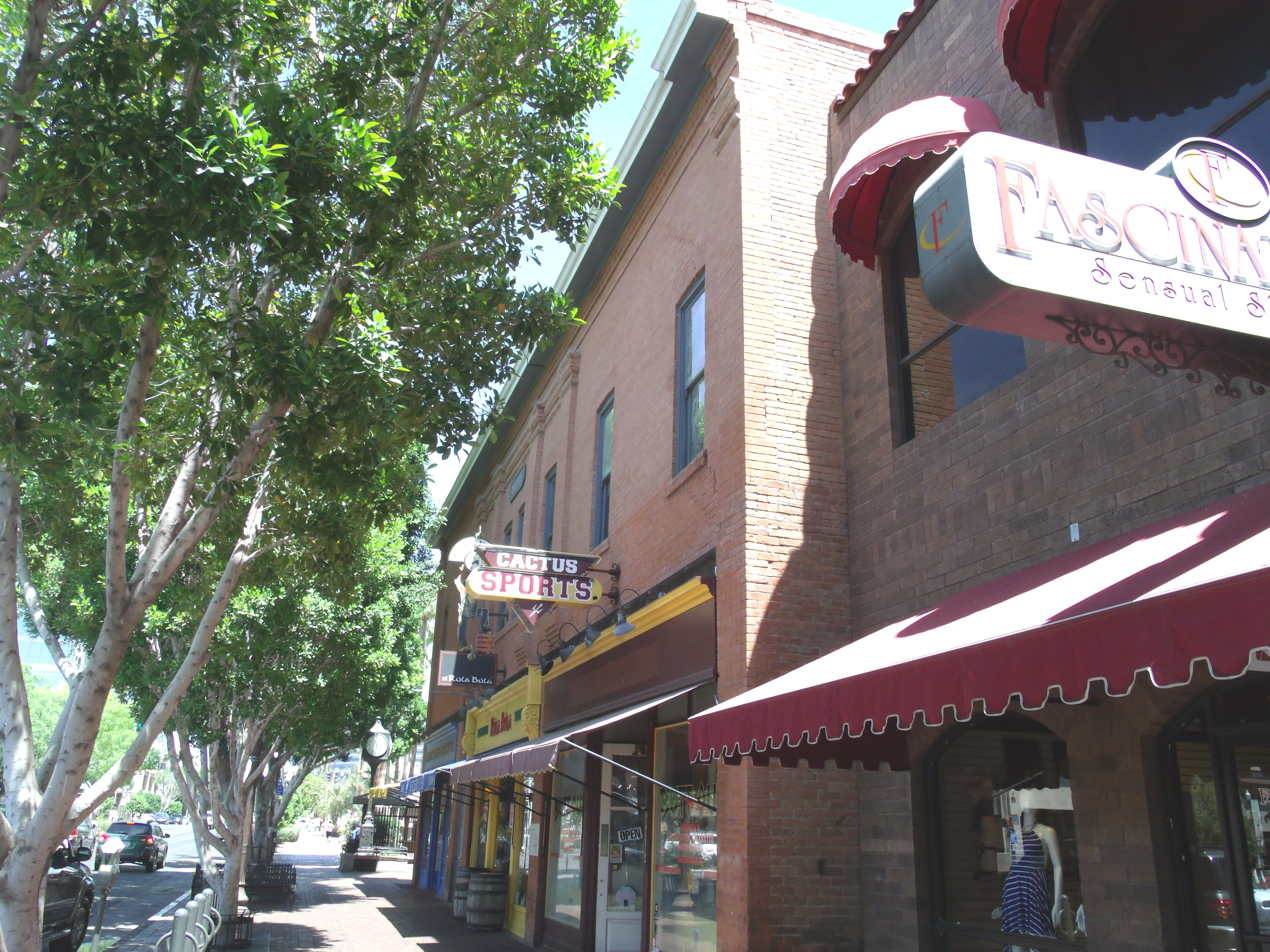
The Andre Building – 1888

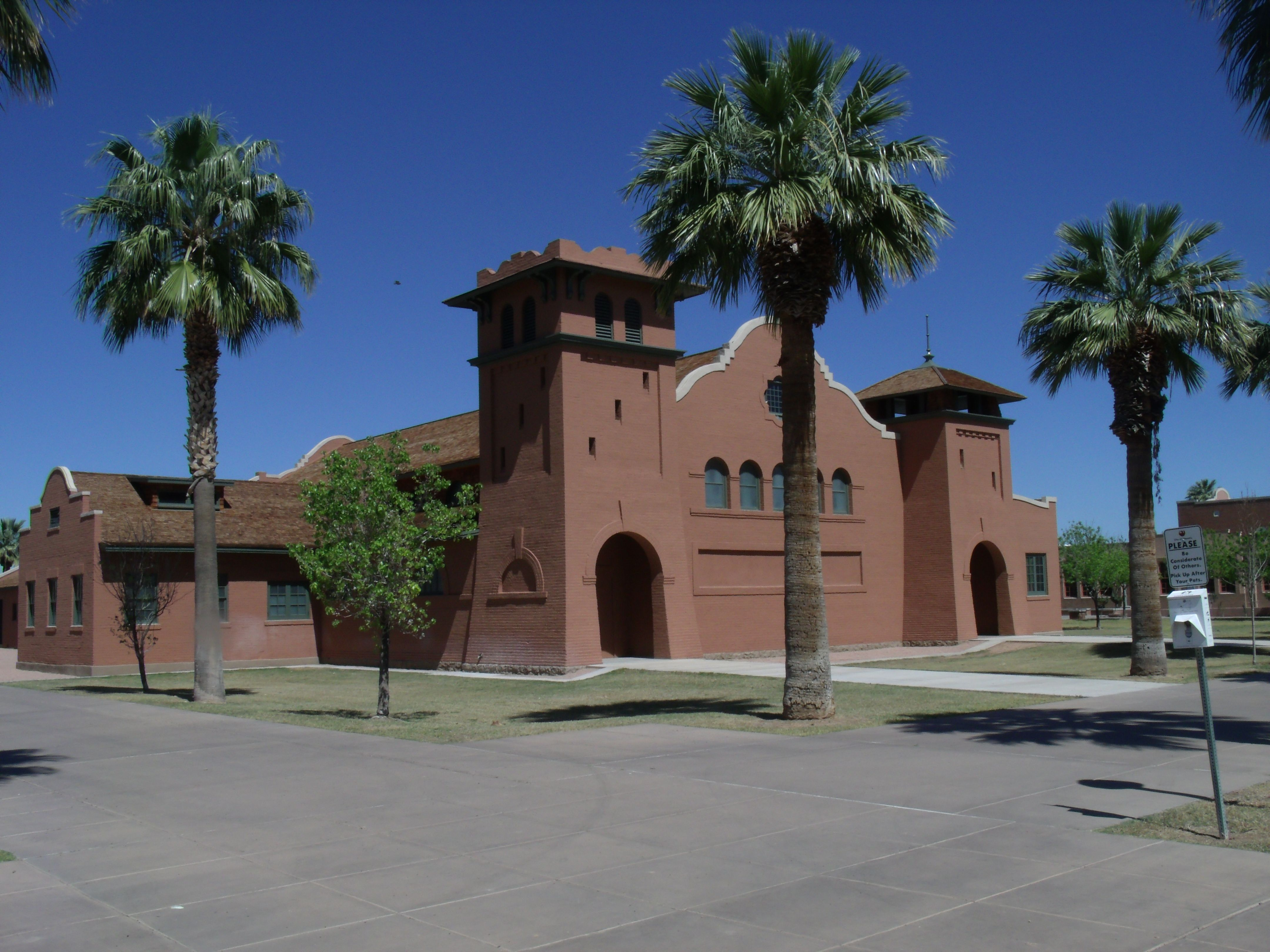
The Phoenix Indian School – 1891

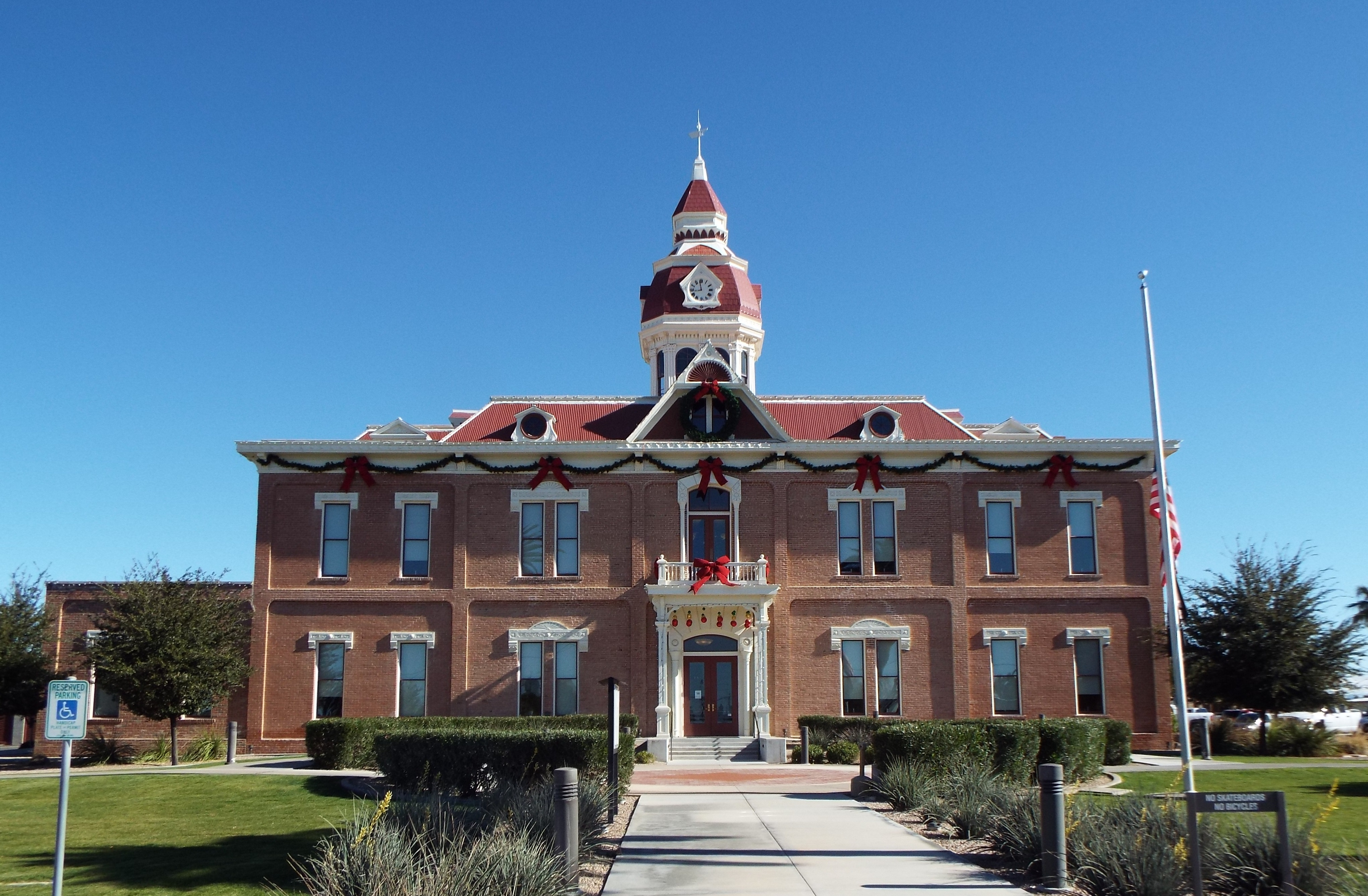
Second Pinal County Courthouse, Florence – 1891

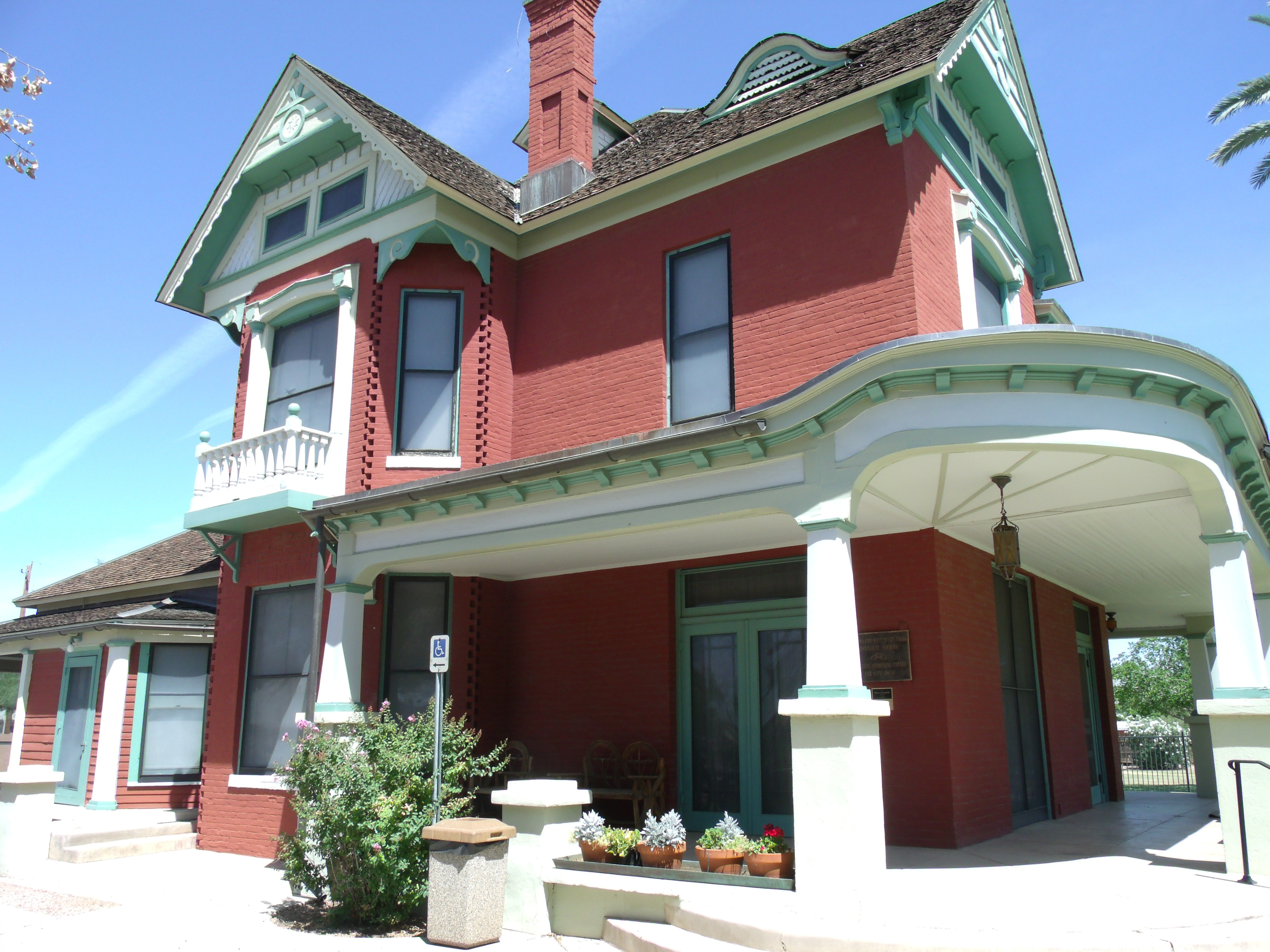
Niels Petersen House, Tempe – 1892

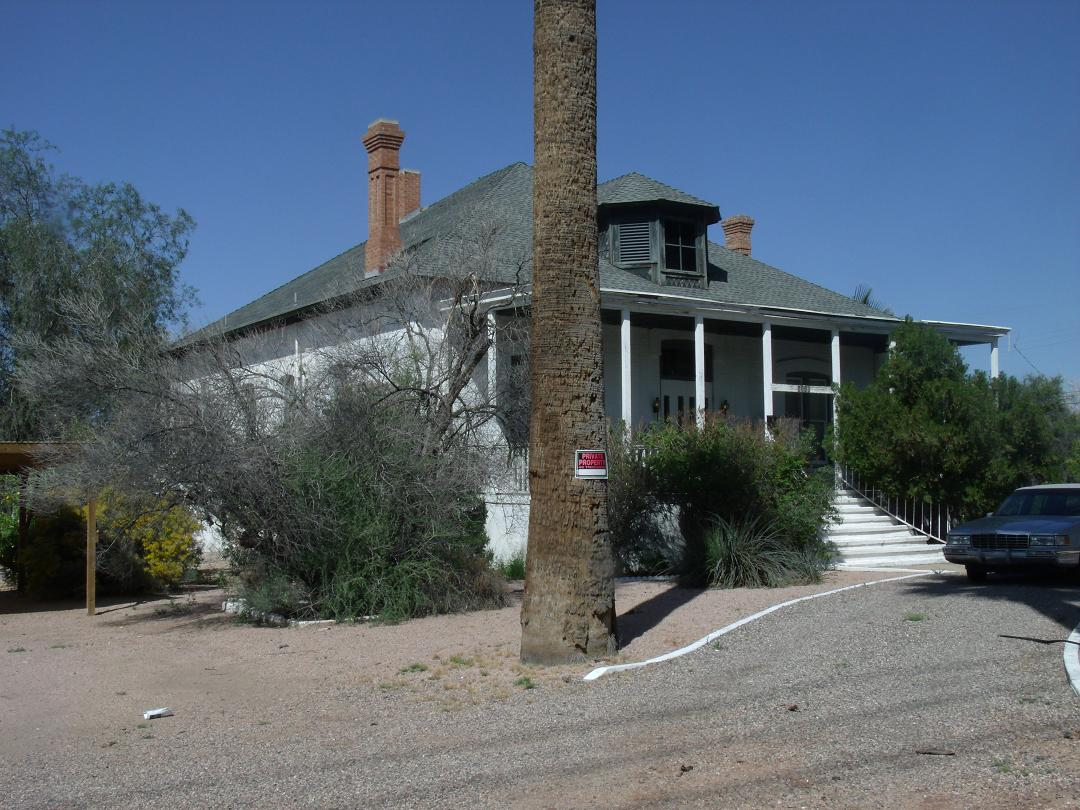
The Frank Tilus House – 1875

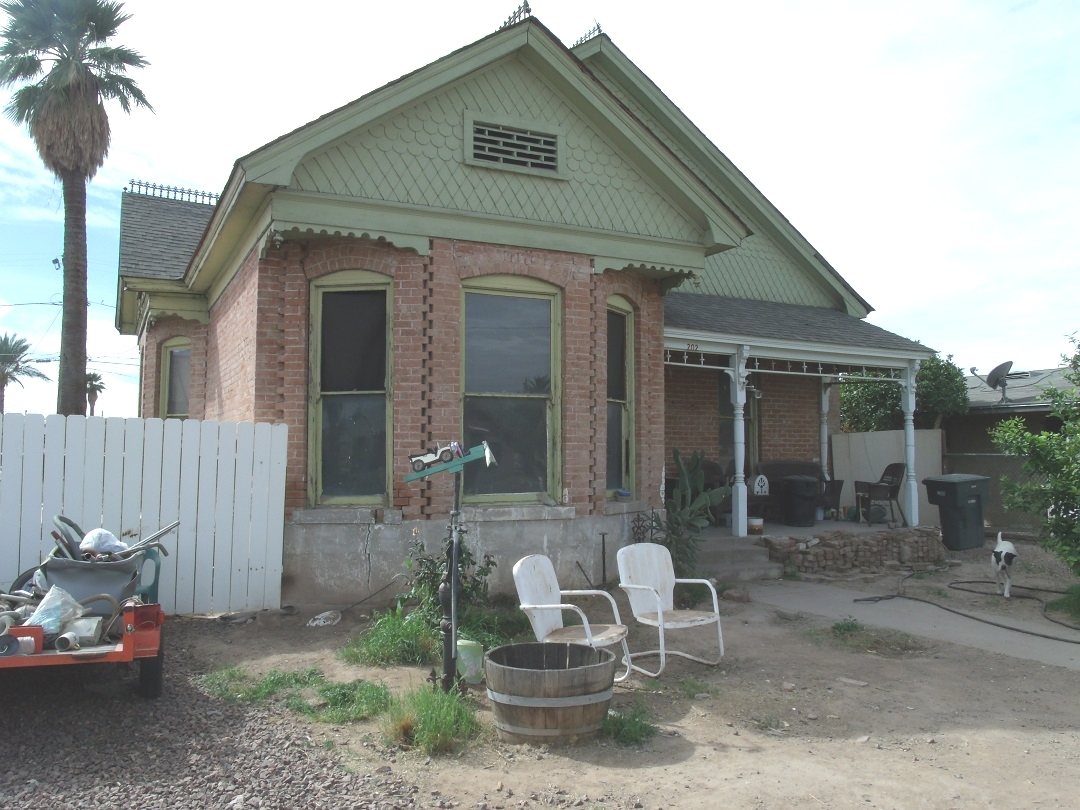
Con P. Cronin House, Phoenix – 1893

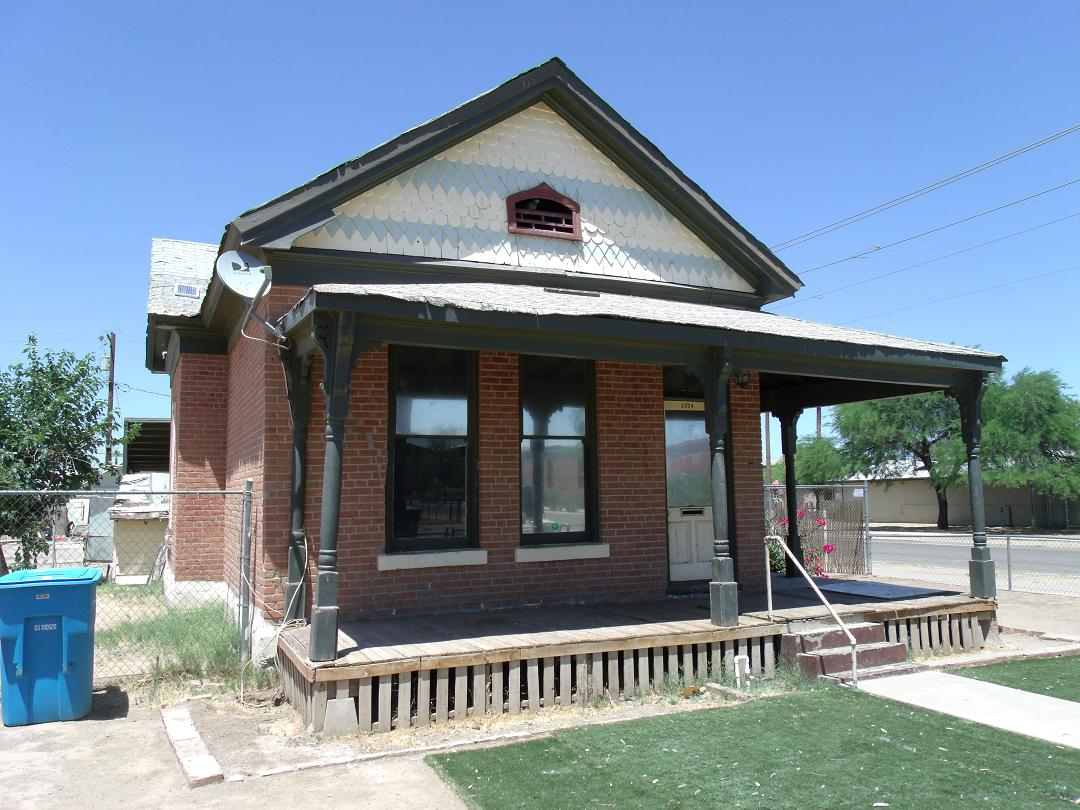
Oscar Roberts Madison House – 1893

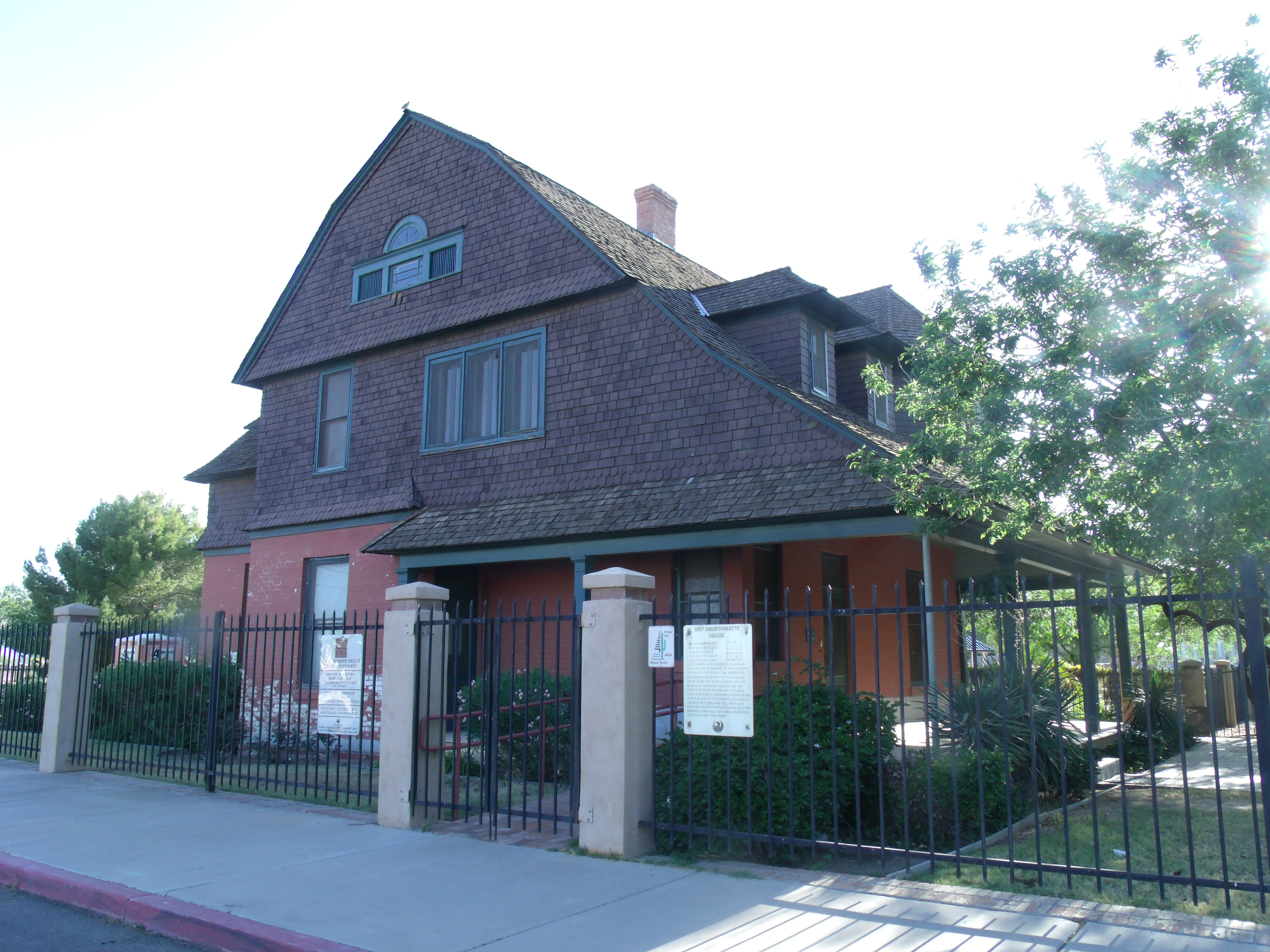
Darius M. Purman House, Phoenix – 1897

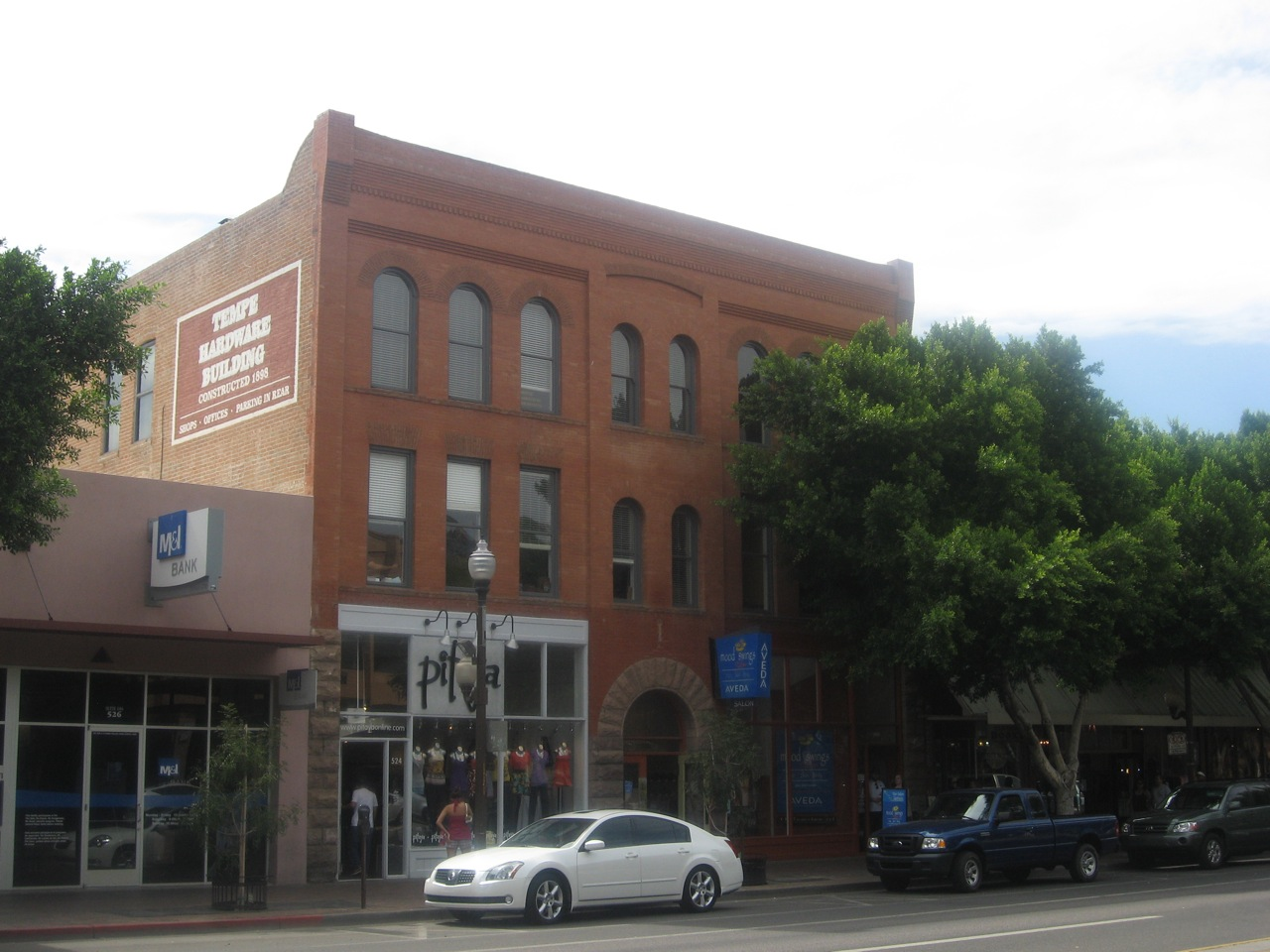
Odd Fellows Hall, Tempe – 1898

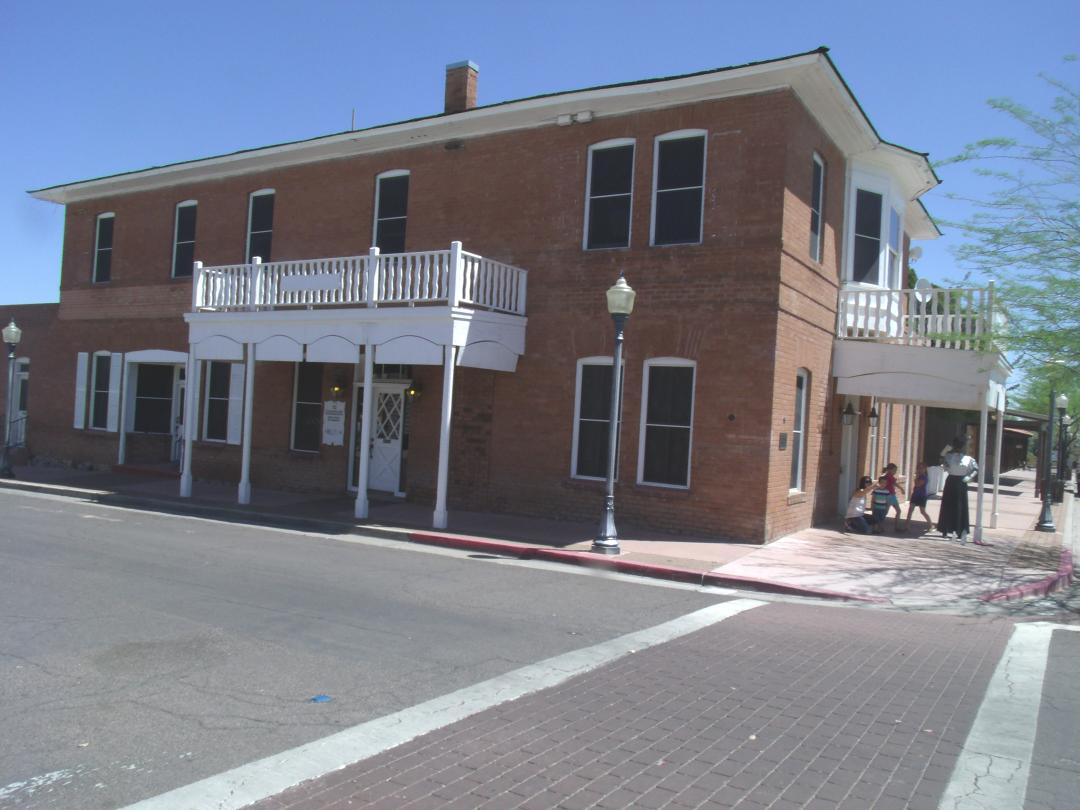
Vernetta Hotel – 1905

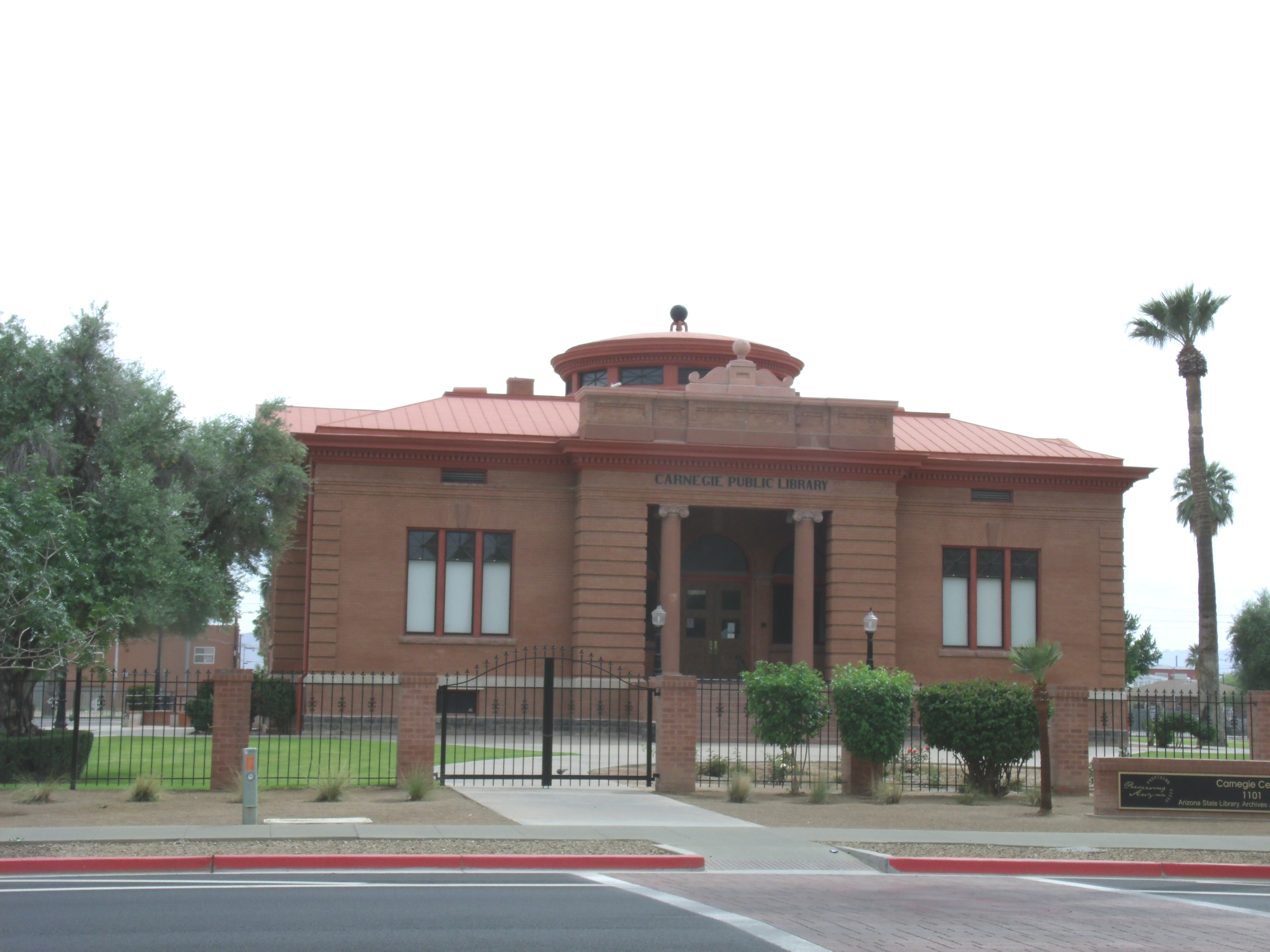
Carnegie Public Library, Phoenix – 1906–07

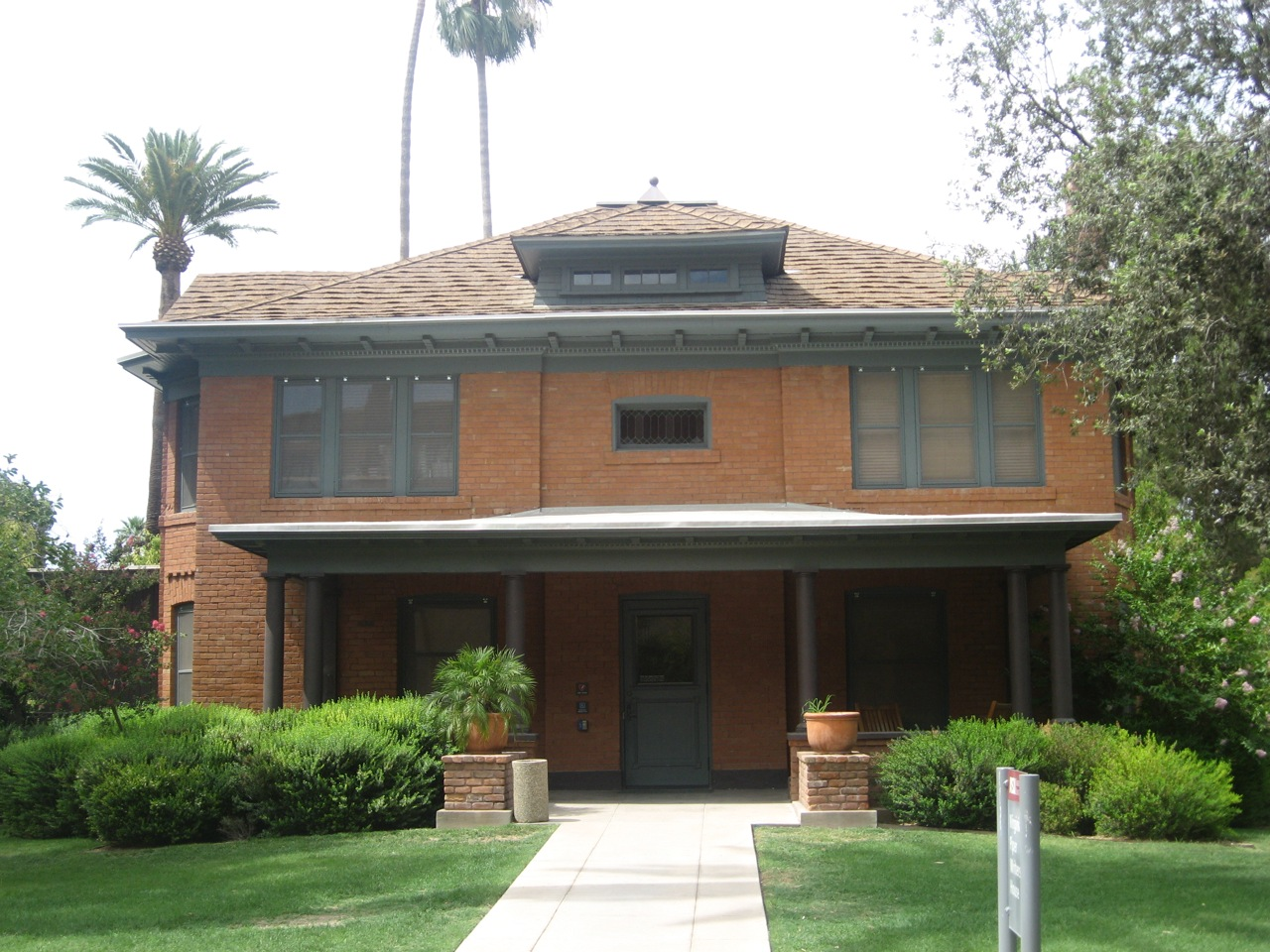
President's House

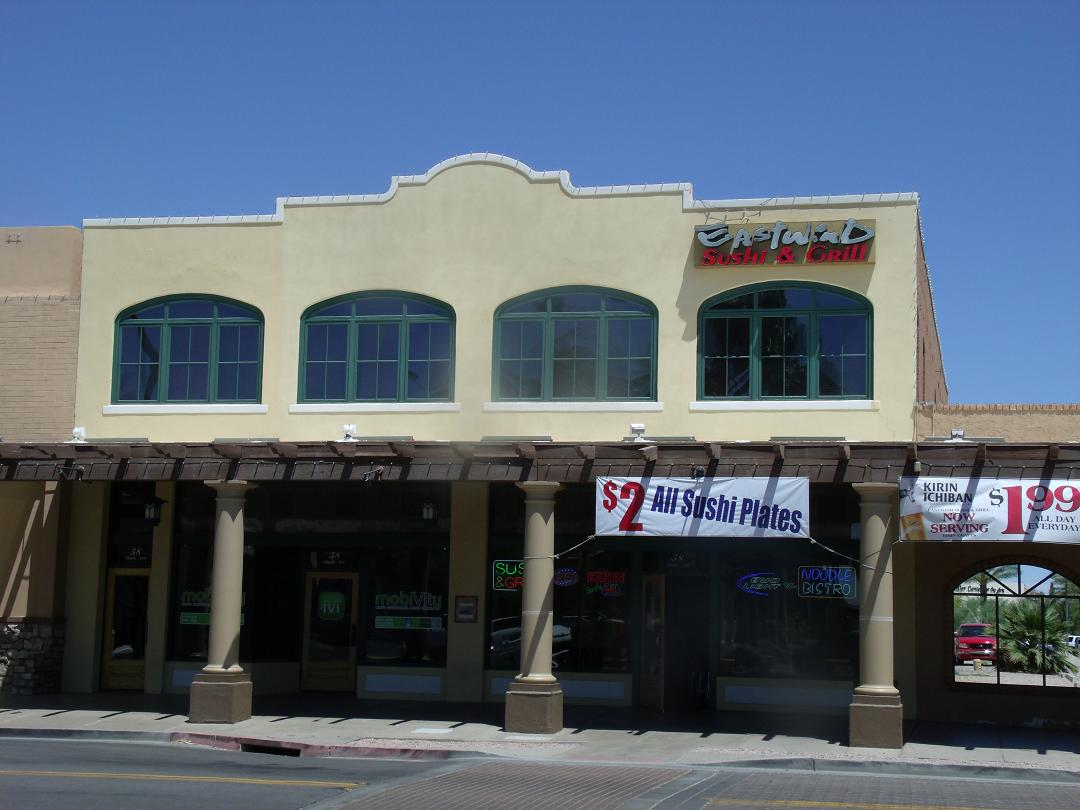
Suhwaro Hotel, Chandler – 1916
