= Niels Petersen House =

Historic house in Arizona, United States

- U.S. National Register of Historic Places
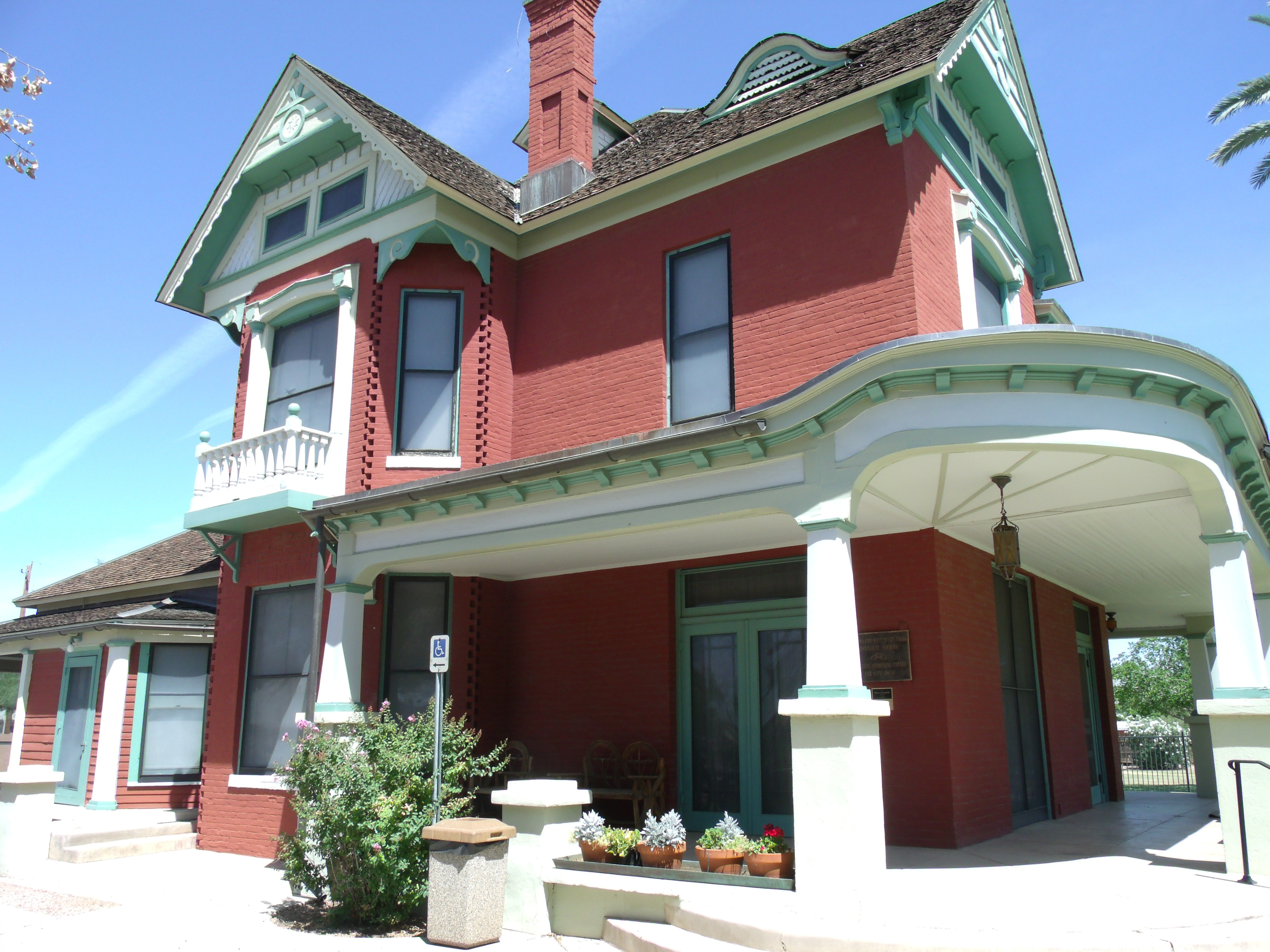
- Niels Petersen House

- Location within Arizona Location within the United States
- Location: Southern Ave. and Priest St., Tempe, Arizona
- Coordinates: 33°23′36″N 111°57′40″W
- Area: 2.9 acres (1.2 ha)
- Built: 1892
- Architect: James M. Creighton
- Architectural style: Queen Anne
- NRHP reference No.: 78000553
- Added to NRHP: January 5, 1978

The Niels Petersen House is a local historic landmark in Tempe, Arizona, that is listed on the U.S. National Register of Historic Places. It is an example of Queen Anne Style brick architecture in the Salt River Valley.

== Biography of Niels Petersen ==
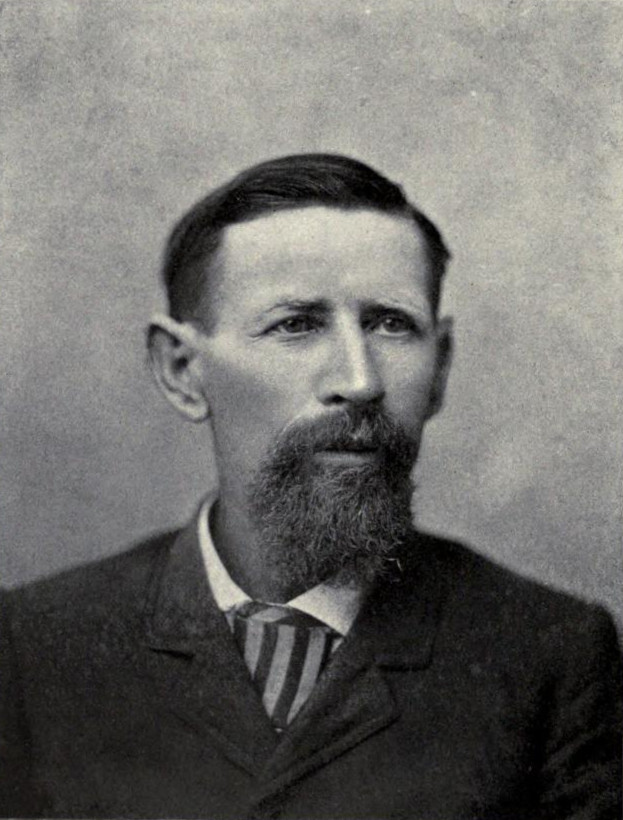
Niels Petersen, original owner of the house

Niels Petersen was born on October 21, 1845, to Peder Mikkelsen and Gunder Marie Nisdatter in Vilslev, Denmark, a small farming village in the southwestern portion of that country. Petersen spent several years in the English Merchant Marines, beginning in 1863, allowing him to travel the world. He continued in this stead until 1870, when he immigrated to the United States.

In 1871, Petersen arrived in the Salt River Valley of central Arizona, where he decided to stake a homestead claim and begin farming. He filed a declaratory statement on July 1, 1874, claiming 160 acres (0.65 km^{2}) in section 29, southwest of Tempe (the original homestead is currently bordered by Priest, southern, Alameda and 52nd Streets). After submitting his claim, Petersen began work on the construction of a two-room adobe house. Four years later, in 1878, Petersen became a United States citizen and subsequently filed a homestead entry, the next step in permanently establishing himself in the valley. The final action in this process was the filing of a homestead proof, providing evidence that improvements to the land had been made by the claimant, which Petersen filed on May 12, 1883. By the time of his final homestead filing, Petersen had built two small adobe houses on the property and maintained 140 acres (0.57 km^{2}) in cultivation.

Among his various undertakings was the operation of Tempe founder Charles Hayden’s general store when he was away on business. Additionally, he worked for the Tempe Irrigating Canal Company, eventually earning shares in the company. In 1884, Peterson married Isabel Dumphy, a teacher at Tempe Grammar School; Isabel subsequently resigned from her teaching position and moved into the Petersen house. She died during child birth one year later, in 1885, and their infant son, John Petersen, is believed to have likewise died within months of his birth.

Within a few years, Petersen began acquiring properties surrounding his homestead claim, thus expanding his interest in the area. His ranch grew to more than 1,000 acres (4.0 km^{2}) and Petersen emerged as one of the area's leading producers of cattle and grain.

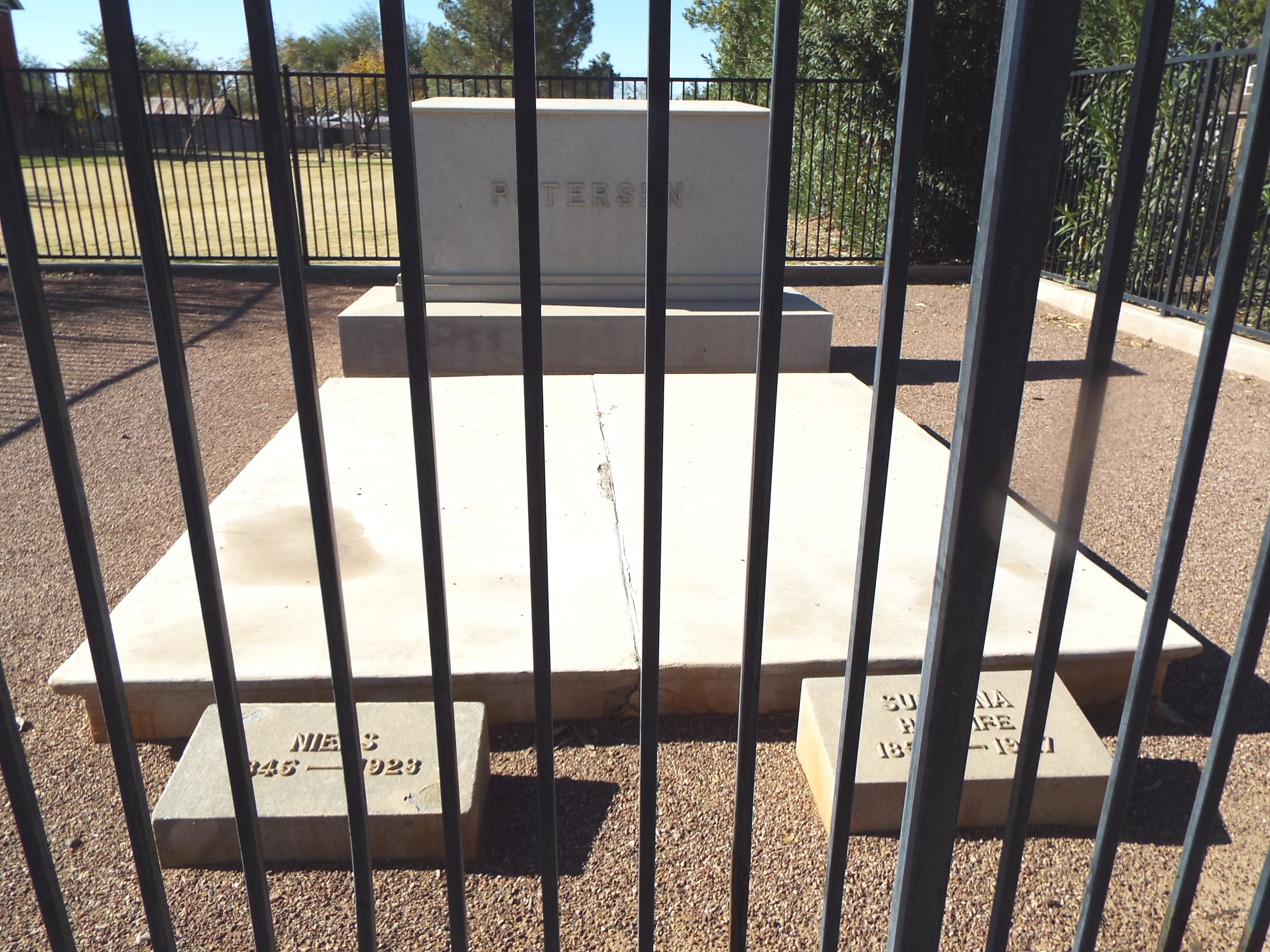
Graves of Niels and Susanna Petersen located within the property which they once owned.

As his financial interests grew, so too did his involvement in the Tempe community. Petersen served as a trustee for the Tempe School District and was a member of the Maricopa County Board of Supervisors, thus asserting his interest in local education. He played a role in the development of the Tempe Methodist Episcopal Church, the Bank of Tempe, and the Tempe Lodge of the Independent Order of Odd Fellows, which was chartered on March 5, 1888. Other positions held by Petersen included treasurer of the Tempe Irrigating Canal Company, president of the Farmers and Merchants Bank, and a term on the Arizona's Eighteenth Territorial Legislature from 1895 to 1896.

By the 1890s, Petersen had emerged as one of the Salt River Valley's wealthiest and most revered citizens. In 1892, he made the decision to construct a new home, in the Queen Anne Victorian style. Architect James Creighton was commissioned by Petersen to design the new two-story home to be constructed at Petersen's ranch south of town. While the new home was being built, Petersen traveled back east, where he met his future bride Susanna Decker of South Montrose, Pennsylvania. They were married on September 1, 1892, and when he returned to his new house in Tempe his new wife accompanied him. Upon completion, Petersen's house was widely considered one of the most elegant homes in the region.

Niels Petersen died in Tempe on April 27, 1923, at the age of 78. As a testament to his status in the community, flags were flown at half-mast and all schools and businesses were closed during his funeral. Originally buried in Tempe's Double Buttes Cemetery, he was exhumed and reburied on the grounds of his home next to the grave of his wife Susanna.

== History of the house ==
The house is significant as the oldest Queen Anne Style brick residence in the Salt River Valley. When Rev. Edward Decker inherited the house in 1927, he made modifications.

The house is associated with Niels Petersen, a Danish immigrant and prominent local farmer and entrepreneur. It is further important for its design by James Creighton, a well-known Arizona architect. The house was built for Petersen who came to Tempe in 1871 and developed substantial land holdings, was president of a local bank, co-founder of the Methodist Episcopal Church, and representative at the 18th Territorial Legislature. Creighton, the architect, worked for many years in Arizona, and among his extant works are the Pinal County Courthouse, Old Main (Arizona State University), and the Tempe Hardware Building on Mill Ave. in Tempe. The house was added to the National Register of Historic Places in 1978.

== Gallery ==
The Historic Niels Petersen House
(NRHP = National Register of Historic Places)
(THPR = Tempe Historic Property Register)

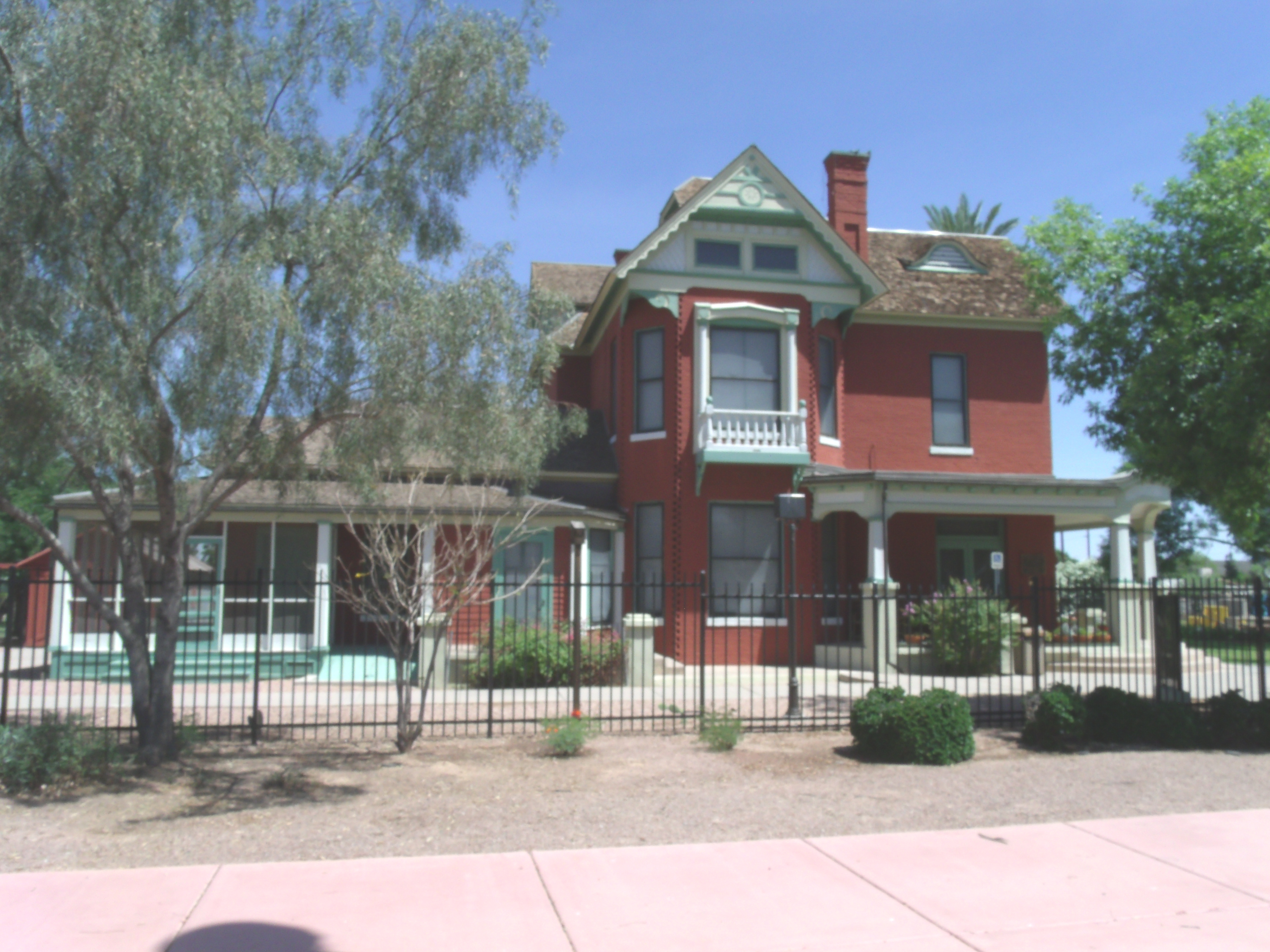
Niels Petersen House (1892) at 1414 W. Southern Ave.

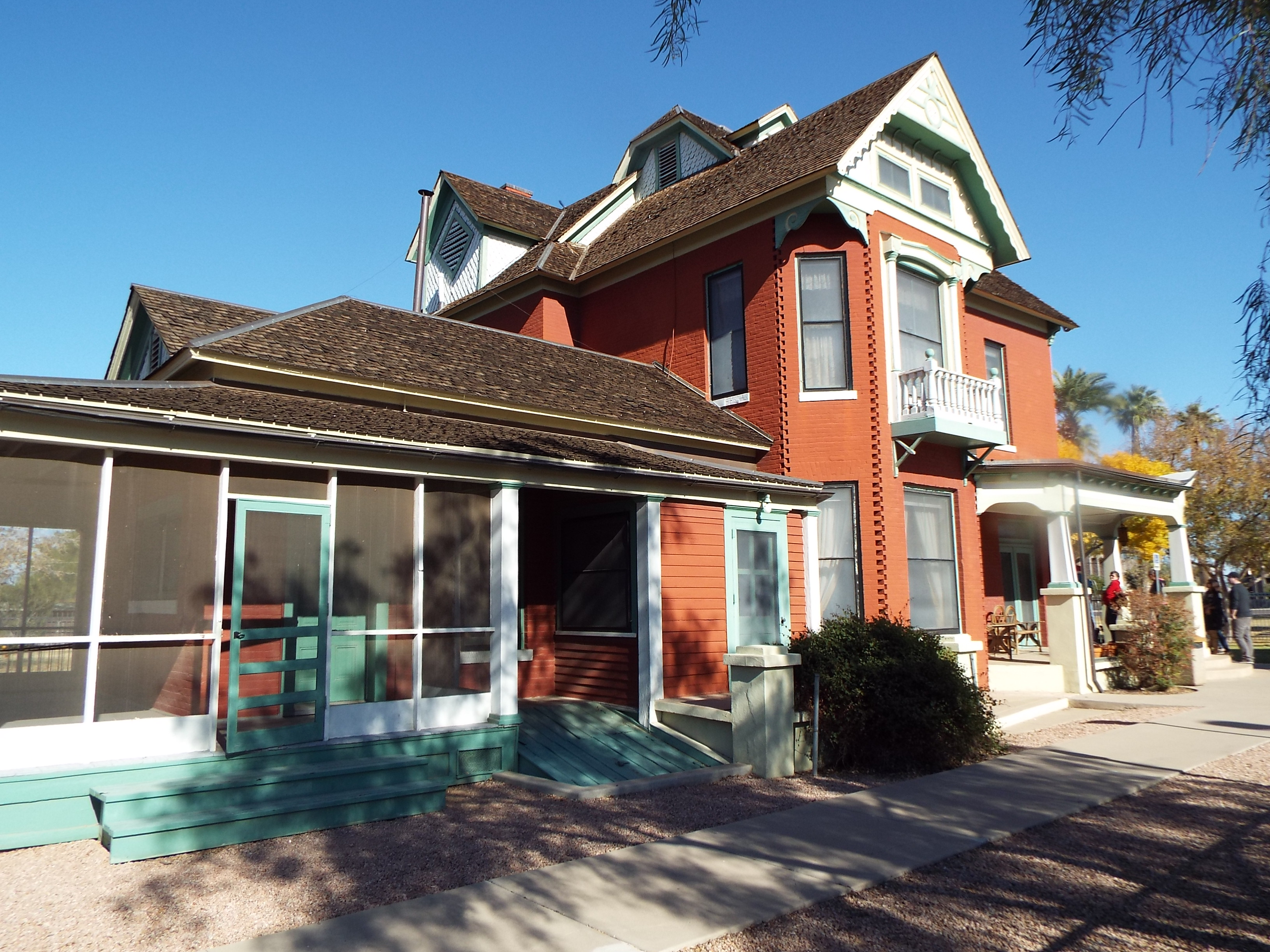
Different view of the Niels Petersen House.

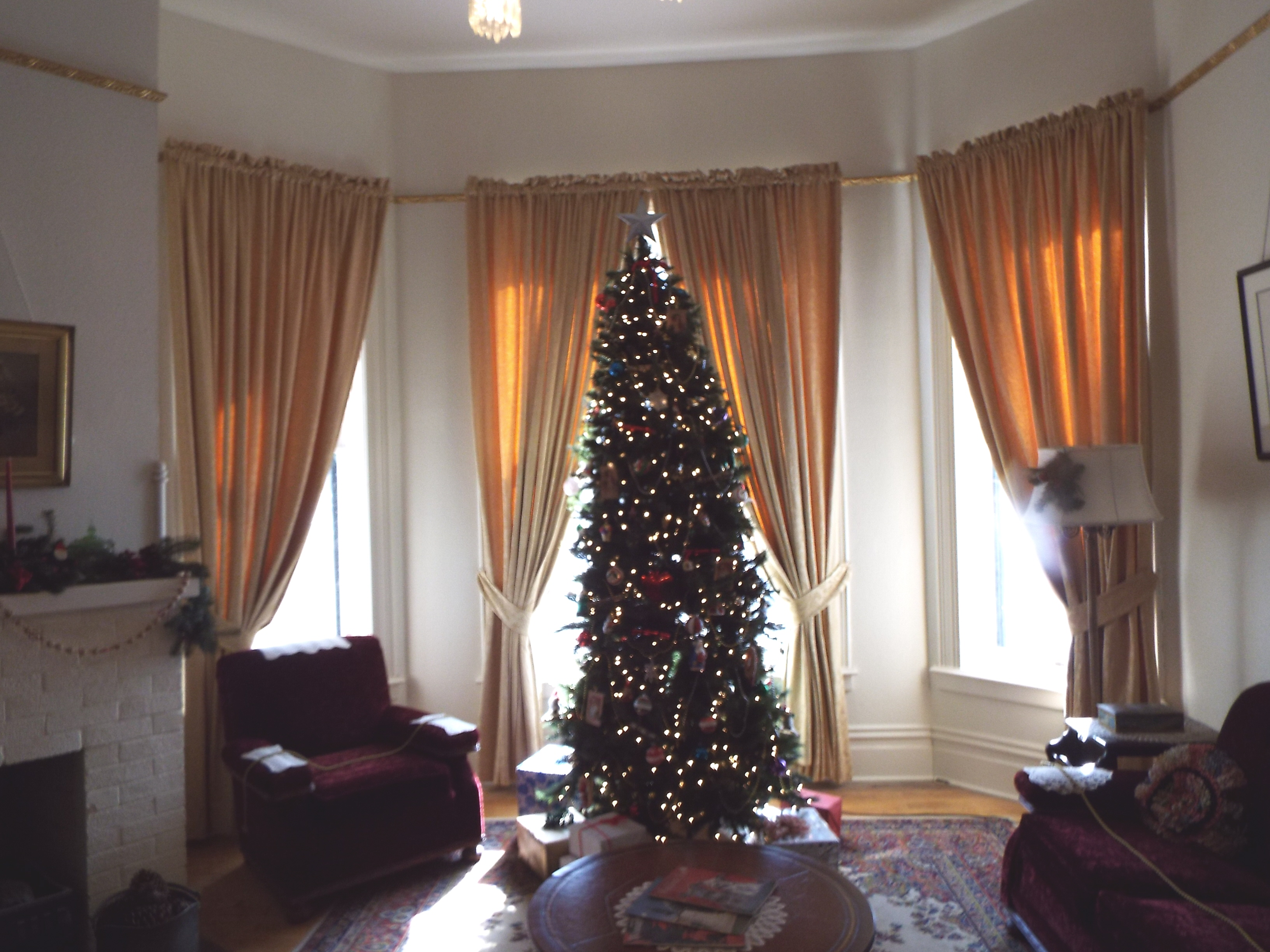
The Niels Petersen House living room.

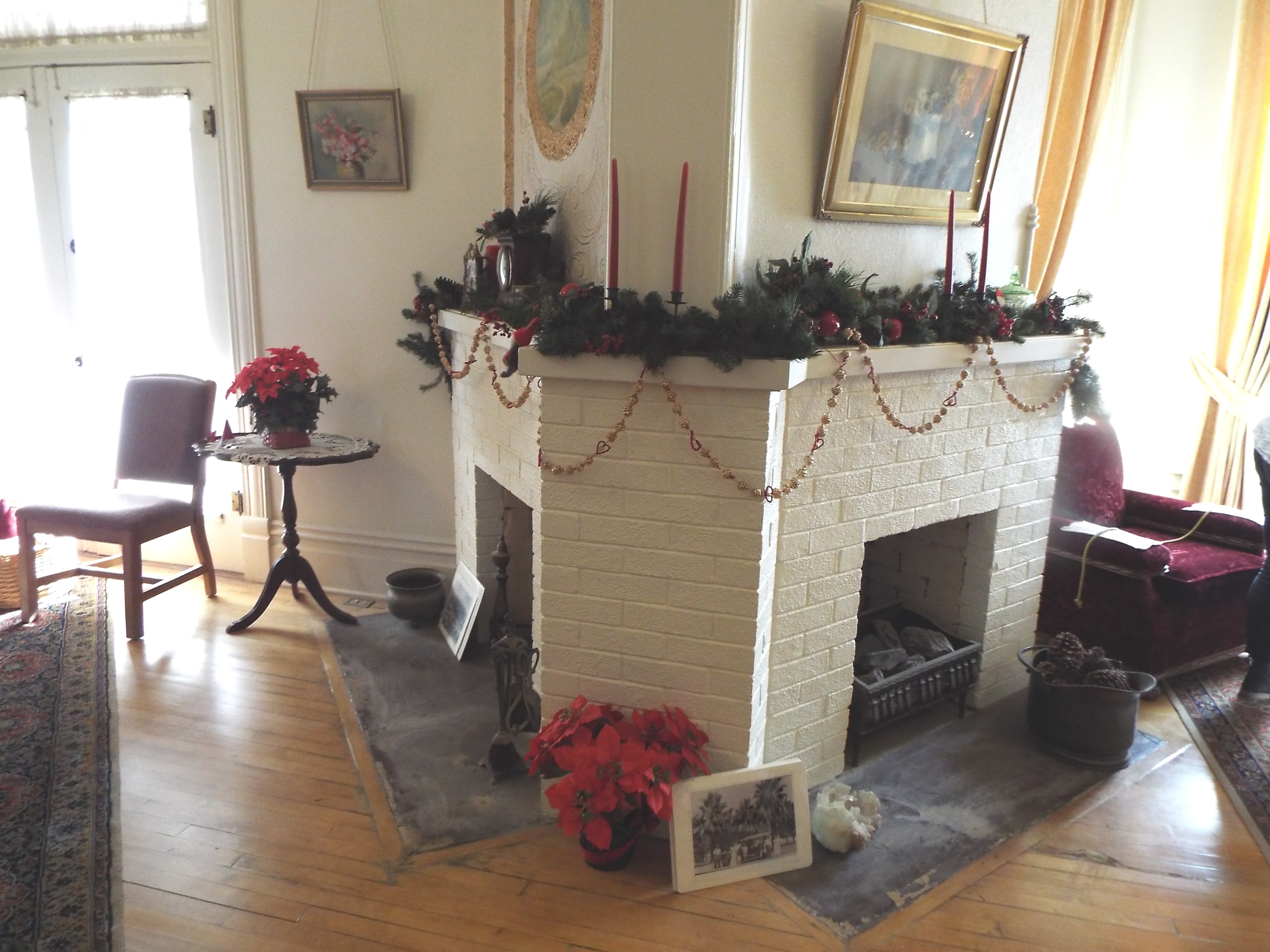
Double chimney in the Niels Petersen House living room.

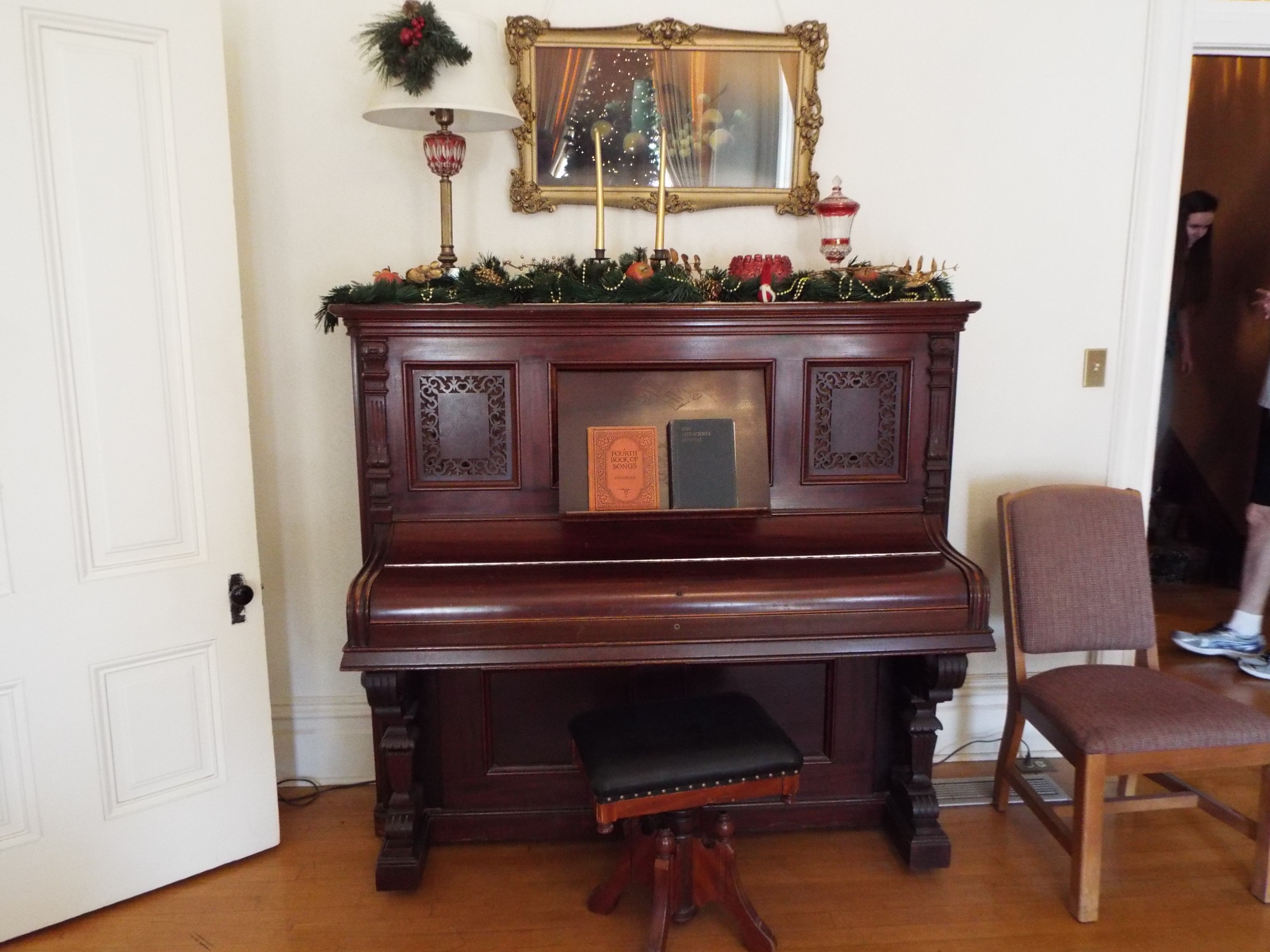
The Niels Petersen House living room piano.

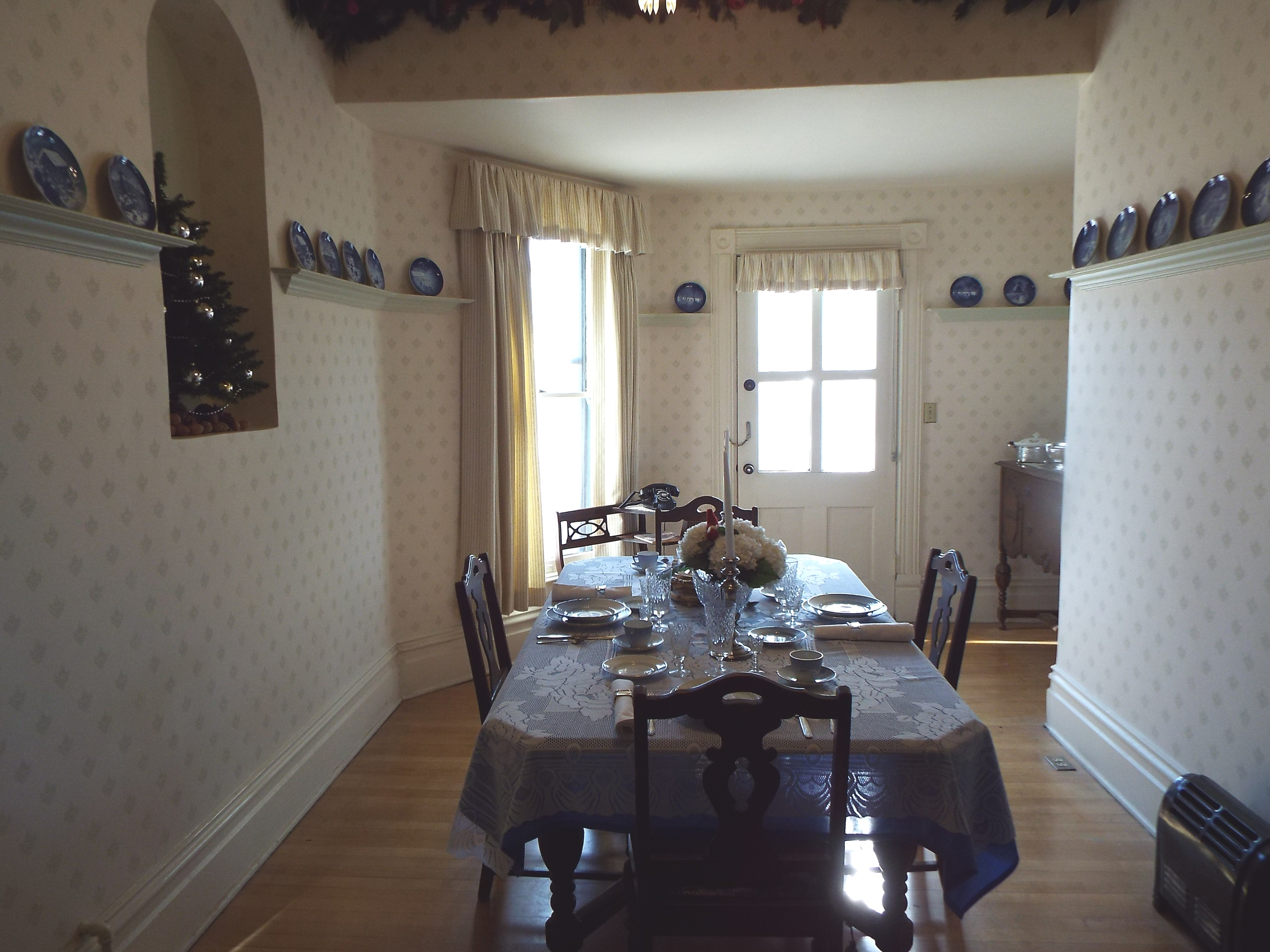
The Niels Petersen House dining room.

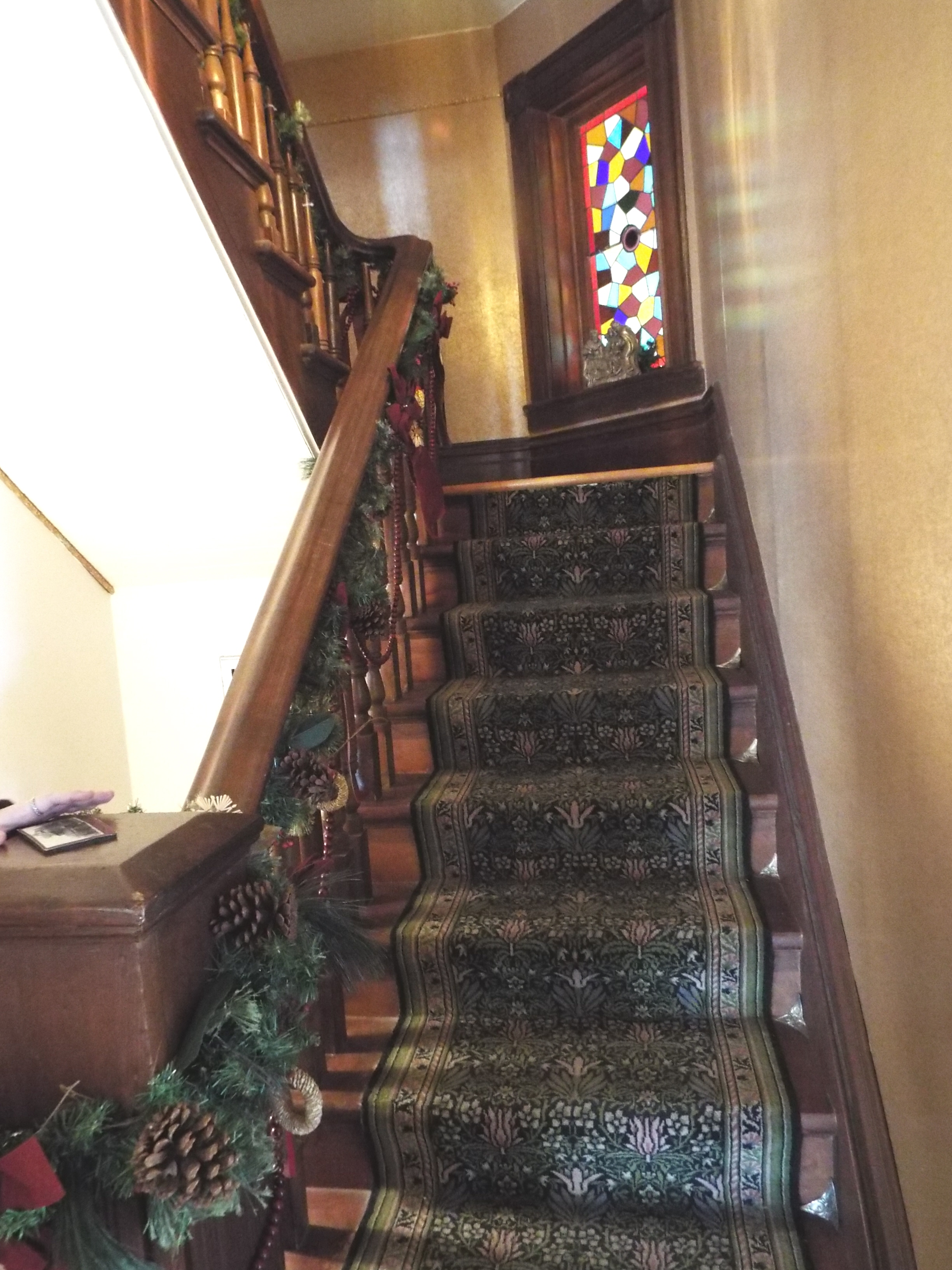
Staircase leading to the second floor.

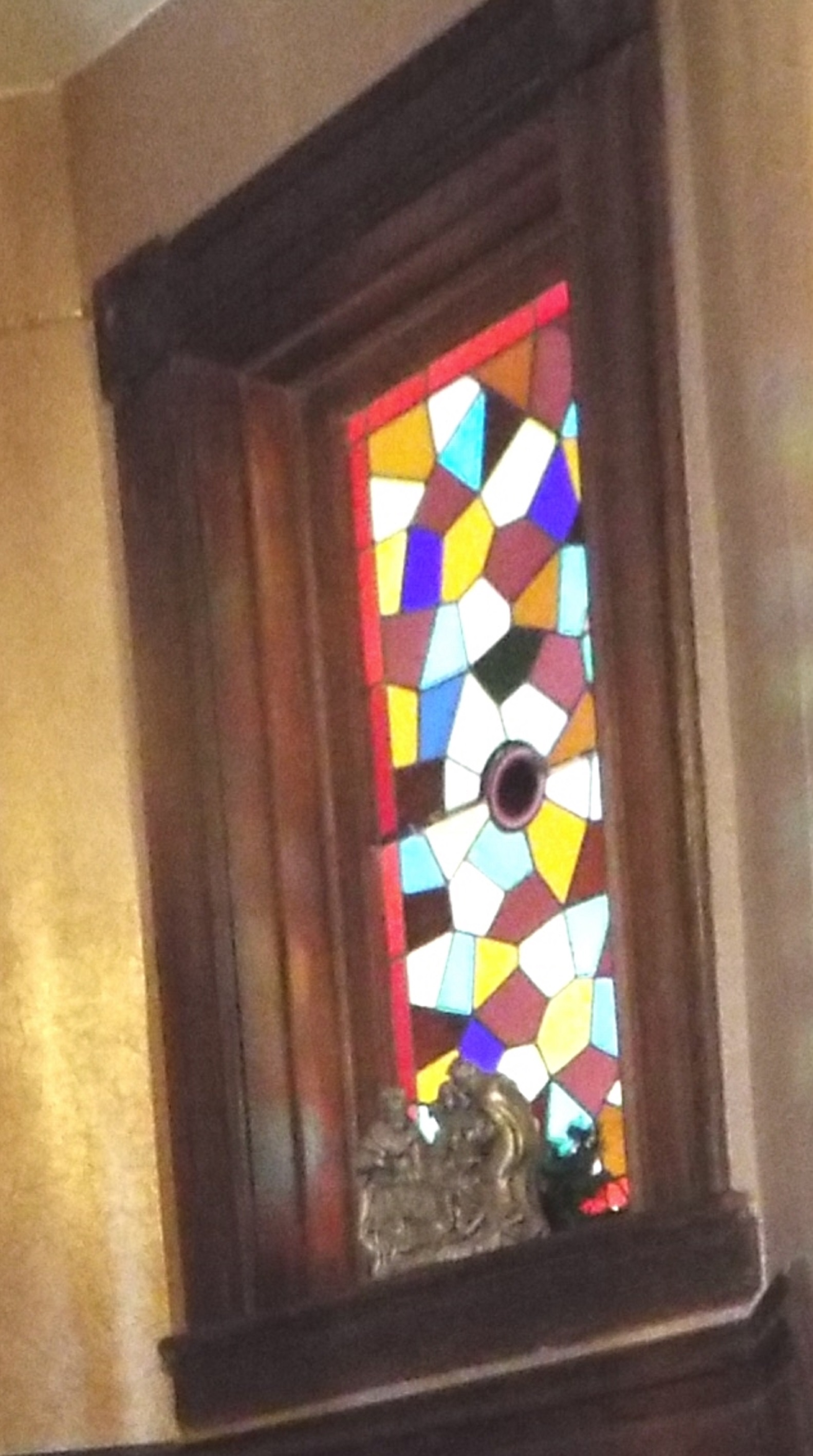
Stained glass window on the staircase hall which leads to the second floor.

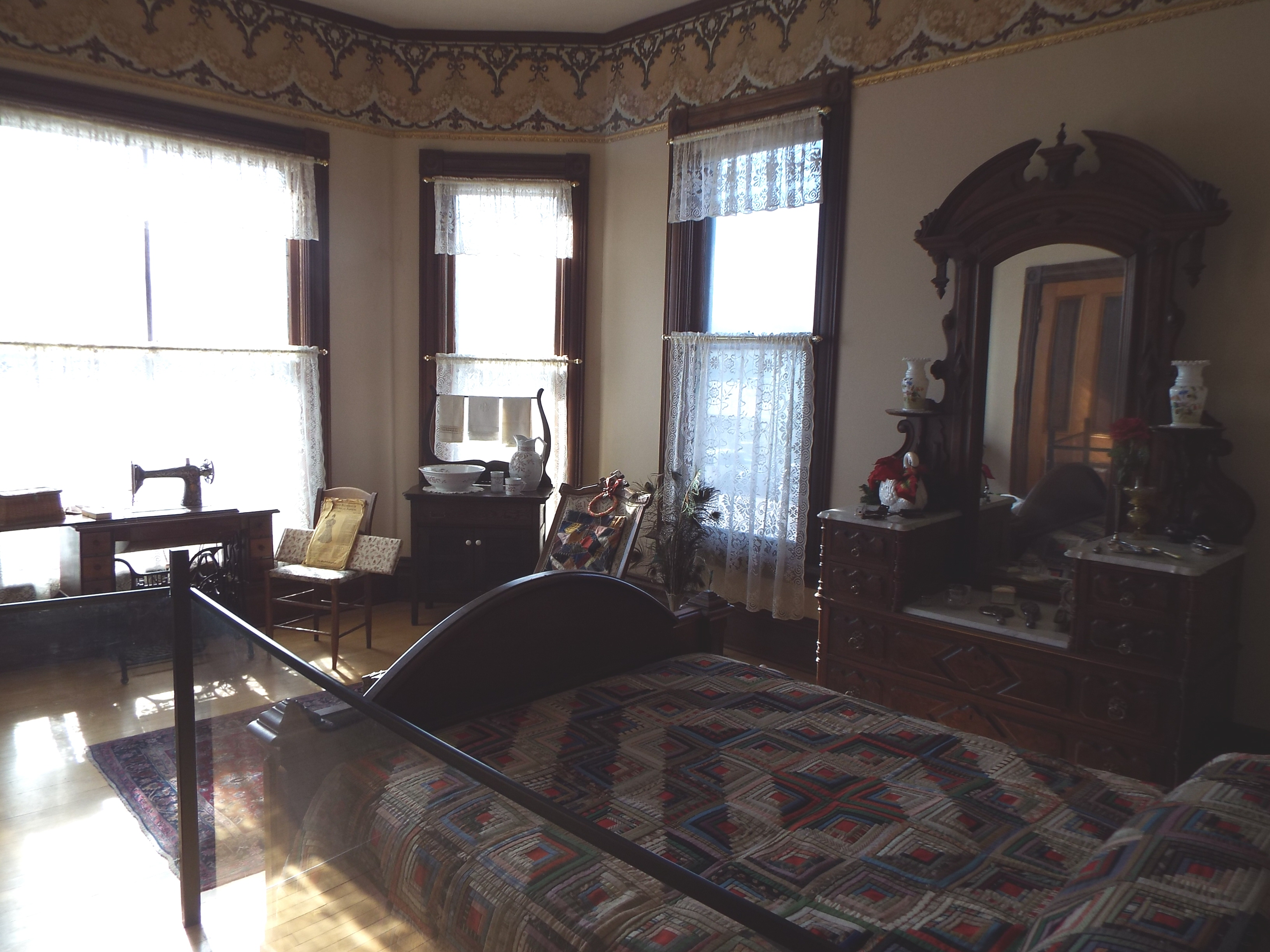
Main bedroom.

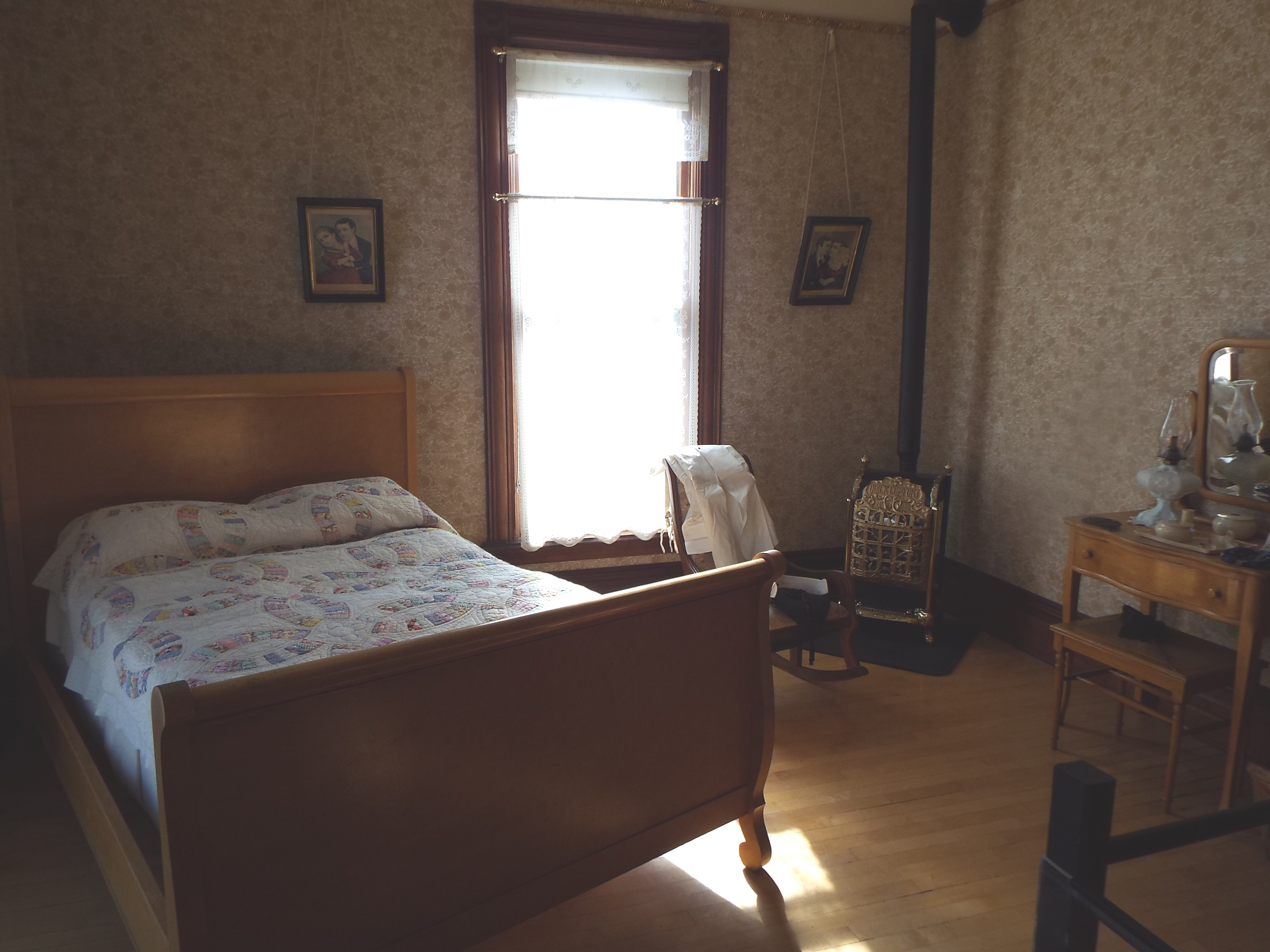
Bedroom.

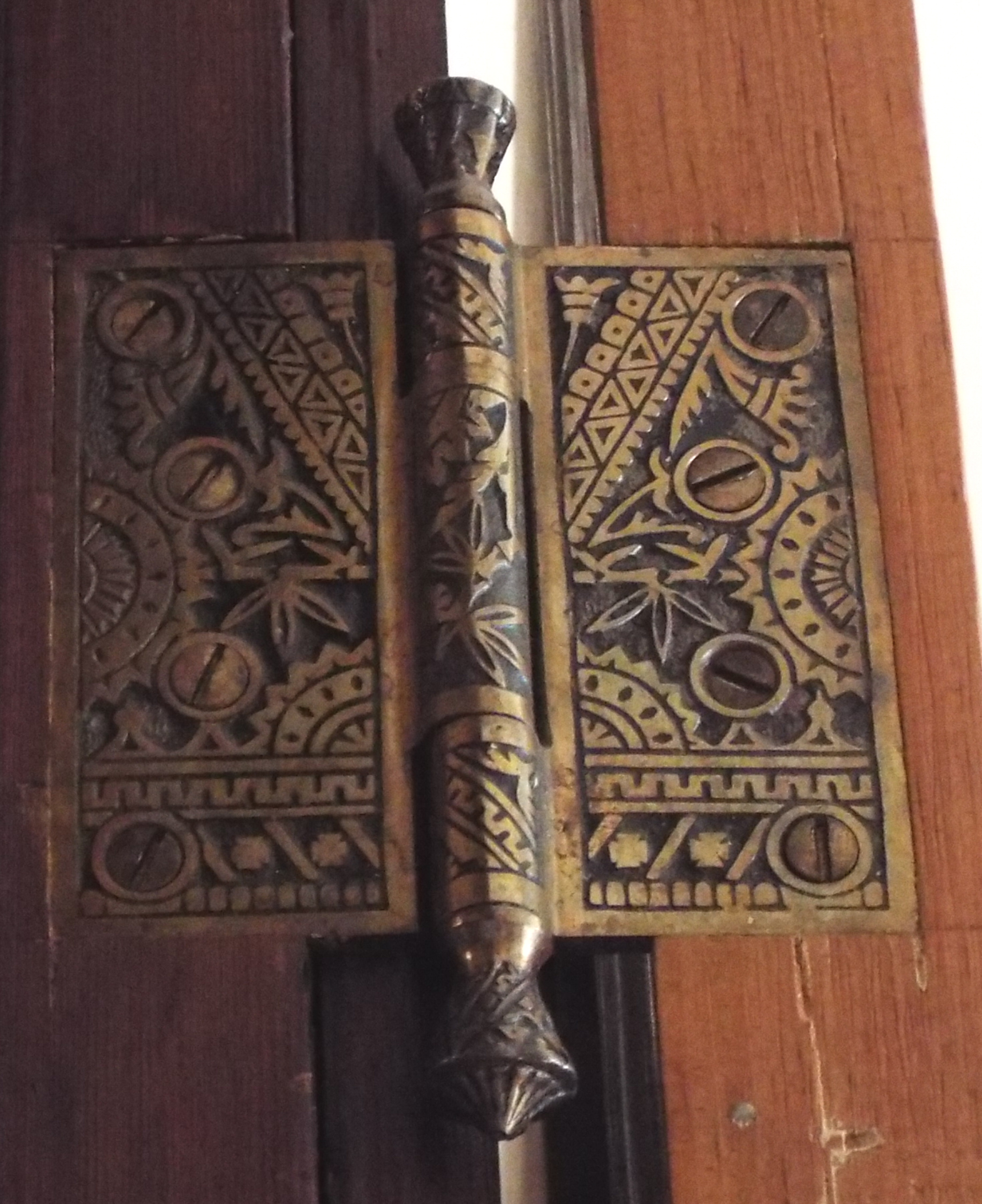
Art work on the original door hinges.

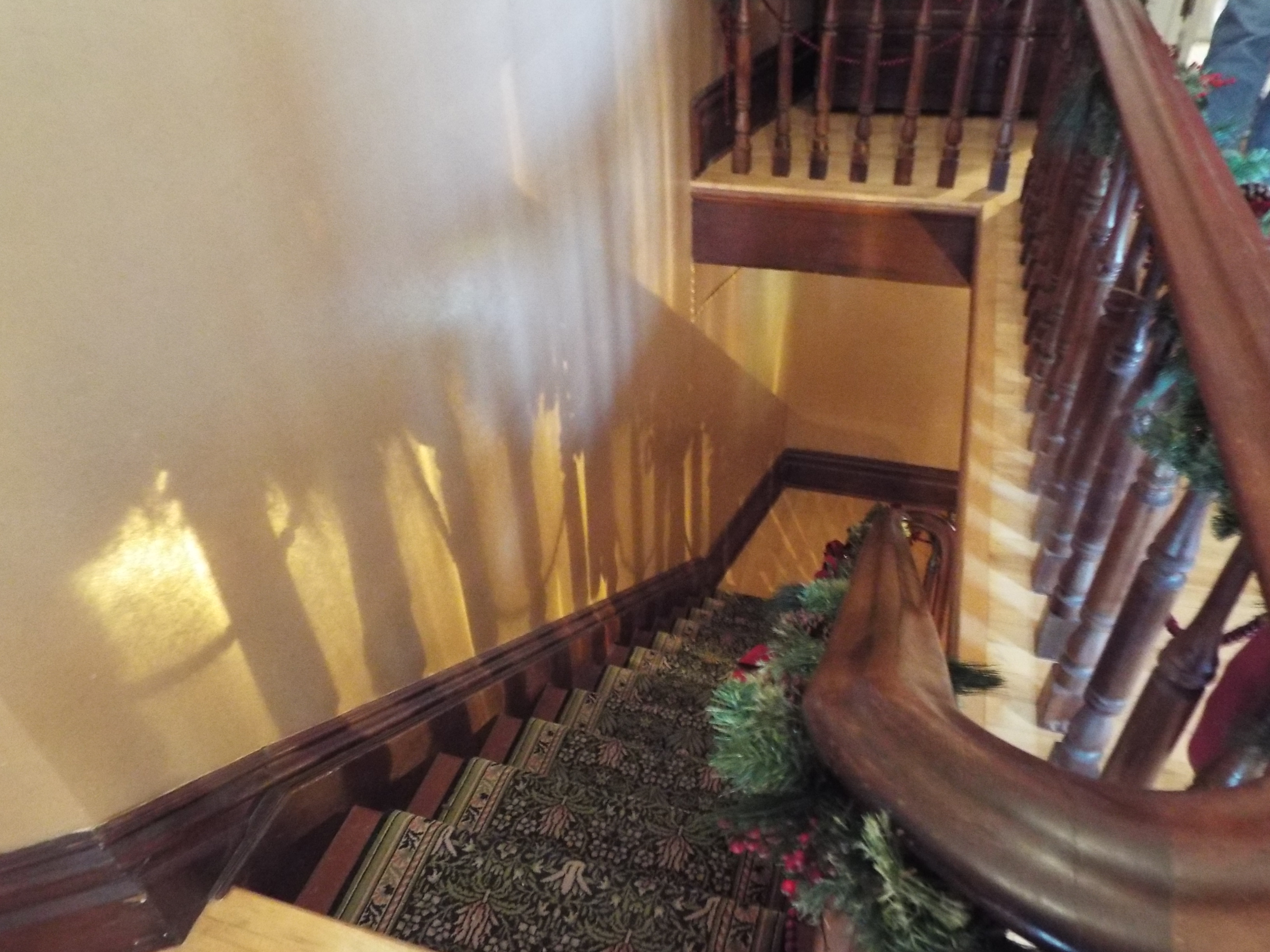
Staircase leading back to the first floor.

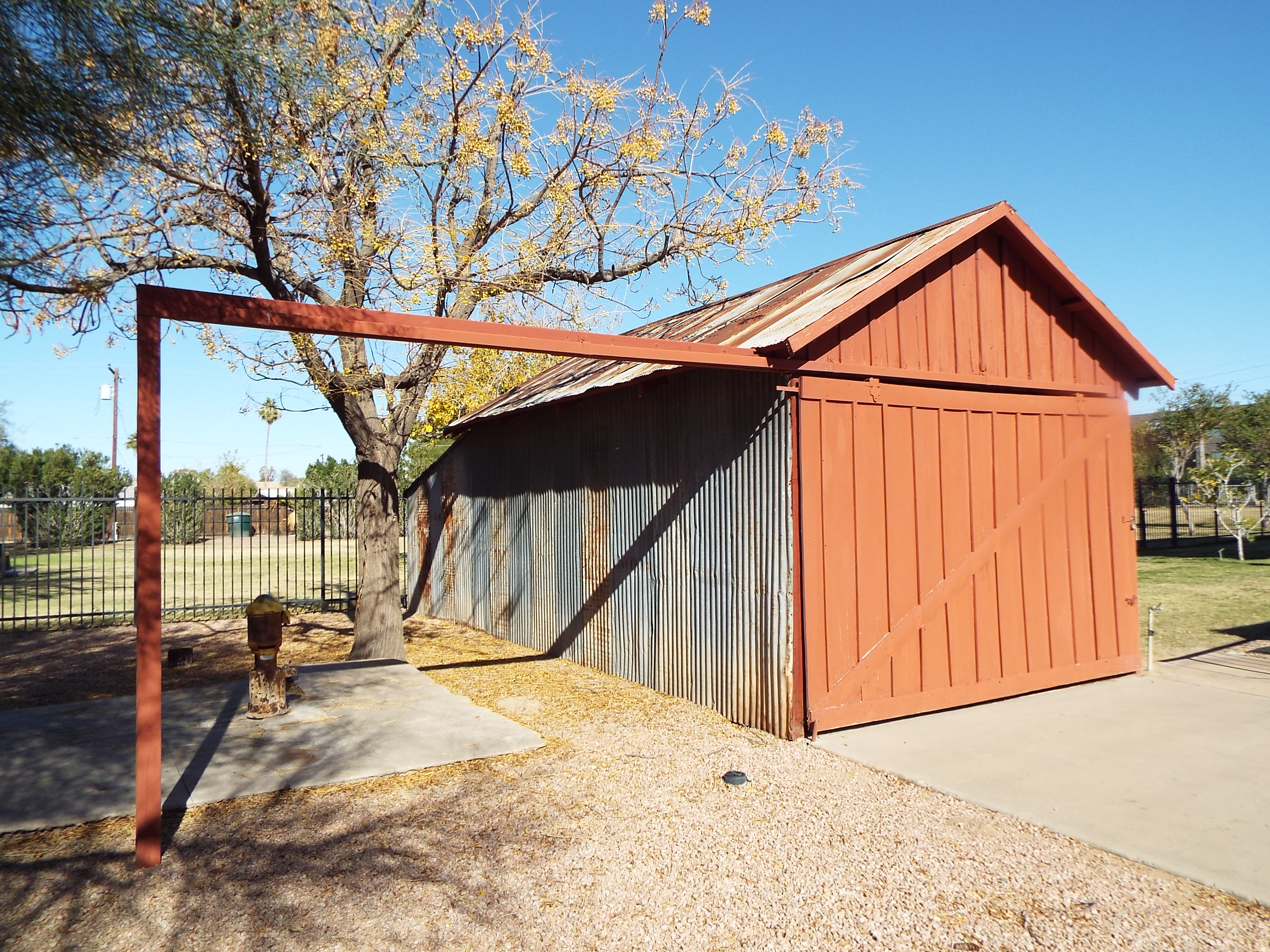
1890s tool shed.

== See also ==
- List of historic properties in Tempe, Arizona
