= Arizona State Prison Phoenix-West =

Prison facility operated for the Arizona Department of Corrections

Coordinates: 33.4328°N 112.1329°W

- Interactive map of Arizona State Prison Phoenix-West
- Location: Phoenix, Arizona
- Status: open
- Security class: security level 2
- Capacity: 519
- Opened: 1996
- Managed by: GEO Group

Arizona State Prison Phoenix-West is one of 13 prison facilities, a private prison operated by the GEO Group on contract with the Arizona Department of Corrections (ADC). ASP Phoenix-West is located in southwest Phoenix, Maricopa County, Arizona.

ASP Phoenix-West has an inmate capacity of approximately 470 in 1 housing unit at security levels 2. The ADC uses a score classification system to assess inmates appropriate custody and security level placement. The scores range from 1 to 5 with 5 being the highest risk or need. ASP Phoenix-West is a secure, minimum custody private prison.

ASP Unit	Custody Level
ASP-West	2

== See also ==
- List of U.S. state prisons
- List of Arizona state prisons
