= Arizona State Prison Complex – Lewis =

Prison facility operated by the Arizona Department of Corrections

Coordinates: 33.209°N 112.653°W

- Interactive map of Arizona State Prison Complex – Lewis
- Location: Buckeye, Arizona
- Status: open
- Security class: mixed
- Capacity: 4,397
- Opened: 1977
- Managed by: Arizona Department of Corrections
- Warden: Jason Monson
- Website: https://corrections.az.gov/lewis

Arizona State Prison Complex – Lewis, one of 13 prison facilities operated by the Arizona Department of Corrections (ADC) is in Buckeye, Maricopa County, Arizona, 43 miles west of the state capital of Phoenix.

== Naming ==
Each of ASPC-Lewis's housing units is named after an ADC correctional officer killed in the line of duty:

- Sandra Bachman
- Theodore Buckley
- Robert Barchey
- Dale Morey
- Paul Rast
- Jim Stiner

ASPC-Lewis is a modern, medium-security prison built by both commercial and convict labor. It has an inmate capacity of over 5,000 in 7 units, at level 2, 3, 4, and a MAX custody security level. The ADC uses a score classification system to assess inmates' appropriate custody and security level placement. The scores range from 1 to 5, with 5 being the highest risk or need.

ASPC Unit	Custody Level
Stiner	3
Barchey	2 and 3 mixed
Morey Unit	4
Bachman	2, 2/3 mixed and 5
Buckley	4
Rast	4 and 5
Eagle Point / Sunrise	2

== Standoff ==
In early 2004, the Morey Unit of the Lewis complex was the site of the longest standoff between inmates and law enforcement officers in United States history. It was a 15-day ordeal, beginning January 18 and ending February 2. Two officers were taken hostage, one male and one female, by two inmates, Ricky Wassenaar and Steven Coy. In addition, they sexually assaulted the female officer and a kitchen officer. The inmates were originally trying to escape, but their plan went awry, and the escape event turned into a hostage situation. Wassenaar was later convicted of 19 charges relating to the siege and was given 16 life sentences. In 2025, Wassenaar was accused of murdering three fellow inmates.

== Notable Inmates ==
- Chris Simcox - Member of the now defunct Minuteman Civil Defense Corps.

== See also ==
- List of U.S. state prisons
- List of Arizona state prisons
