= Arizona State Prison Complex – Yuma =

Prison facility operated by the Arizona Department of Corrections

Coordinates: 32°29′18″N 114°38′26″W

- Interactive map of Arizona State Prison Complex – Yuma
- Location: San Luis, Arizona
- Status: open
- Security class: mixed
- Capacity: 4,200
- Opened: 1987
- Managed by: Arizona Department of Corrections
- Director: David Shinn

Arizona State Prison Complex – Yuma is one of 13 prison facilities operated by the Arizona Department of Corrections (ADC). ASPC–Yuma is located in San Luis, Arizona, 187 miles southwest from the state capital of Phoenix, Arizona. It lies about 12 miles south of downtown Yuma and only about three miles north of the Mexican border.

The Cocopah Unit, a 250 bed minimum security facility, readied for inmates in 1986, but was not used until 1987 due to a possible sale to the Federal government that never occurred. The Cocopah Unit, is a level two (low custody) unit. In October 1992, ASP Yuma became part of the Arizona State Prison Complex – Perryville until November 1995 when it became its own prison complex.

In June 1995, the Cheyenne Unit began construction using both commercial and inmate labor. In September 1996, the Cheyenne Unit, a level three (medium custody) was opened to receive inmates.

In June 1997, the Dakota Unit began construction with only commercial labor and was expected to open in September 1998.

ASPC–Yuma has an inmate capacity of 2,245 in 3 housing units, at security levels 2, 3 and 4. The ADC uses a score classification system to assess each inmate's appropriate custody and security level placement. The scores range from 2 to 5, with 5 being the highest risk or need. (level 1 no longer exists). ASPC–Yuma is a modern, medium security prison.

The ASPC–Yuma complex has added two new units in the past 10 years. The new additions are La Paz level 2 and Cibola level 3. The 2 new units house over 2000 inmates. Bringing the population to a total of at least 4,200 inmates incarcerated.

ASPC Unit	Custody Level
Cheyenne	3
Cocopah	2
Dakota	4
La paz	2
Cibola	3

== Notable Inmates ==
Inmate Name	Register Number	Status	Details
Sterling Hunt	347465	Serving three life sentences without the possibility of parole.	Perpetrator of the 2018 Globe, Arizona shooting in which he murdered 3 people and injured 1 other.

== See also ==
- Lists of United States state prisons
- List of Arizona state prisons
