= Arizona State Prison Complex – Phoenix =

Prison facility operated by the Arizona Department of Corrections

Coordinates: 33.453°N 112.026°W

- Interactive map of Arizona State Prison Complex – Phoenix
- Location: Phoenix, Arizona
- Status: open
- Security class: mixed
- Capacity: 1,042
- Opened: 1979
- Managed by: Arizona Department of Corrections

Arizona State Prison Complex – Phoenix is one of 13 prison facilities operated by the Arizona Department of Corrections (ADC). ASPC-Phoenix is located in Phoenix, Maricopa County, Arizona, which includes a minimum security unit near Globe, the Arizona Correctional Facility for Woman (ACW), and ASPC-Aspen.

== Description ==
The Phoenix Complex is a unique facility within the Department. Four of its units are on the grounds of the Arizona State Hospital and leased through the Department of Health Services. They are Alhambra Reception and Treatment Center, which opened in 1979, and handles all incoming male inmates. Reception has a design capacity of 207; another 40 beds are in B-Ward, the Treatment Center; and there are 65 beds designated for resident workers (F-area). The other units are Aspen DWI, a 200-bed facility which opened in 1983 for adult males incarcerated under the state Driving While Intoxicated (DWI) law; Now called Aspen MTU, It is operated as a Mental Health treatment facility for male inmates that are mentally ill but higher functioning. Flamenco Mental Health Center, a licensed 105-bed psychiatric hospital for adult males which opened in 1985 and now is used to house Protective segregation and Max custody inmates; and Flamenco Health Center for Women, a licensed 20-bed behavioral hospital for adult females which opened in 1990.

One other unit is separated geographically but considered part of the Phoenix Complex. ASP-Globe, a 150-bed prison for adult males which was originally Pinal Mountain Juvenile Institution; it was legislatively transferred to ADC on July 1, 1991.

ASPC-Phoenix has an inmate capacity of approximately 1,042 in seven housing units at security levels 2, 3, 4 and 5. The ADC uses a score classification system to assess inmates appropriate custody and security level placement. The scores range from 1 to 5 with 5 being the highest risk or need. ASPC-Phoenix is a modern, medium to high security prison.

ASPC Unit	Custody Level
Reception	5
Inmate Worker	2
B-Ward	5
Flamenco-Male	4
Flamenco-Female	4
Aspen/SPU	3
Globe	2

== See also ==
- List of U.S. state prisons
- List of Arizona state prisons
