= Arizona State Prison Complex – Douglas =

Prison facility operated by the Arizona Department of Corrections

Coordinates: 31°27′47″N 109°35′30″W

- Interactive map of Arizona State Prison Complex – Douglas
- Location: Douglas, Arizona
- Status: open
- Security class: mixed
- Capacity: 2148
- Opened: 1984
- Managed by: Arizona Department of Corrections

Arizona State Prison Complex – Douglas is one of 13 prison facilities operated by the Arizona Department of Corrections (ADC).
ASPC-Douglas is located in Douglas, Cochise County, Arizona, 248 miles southeast from the state capital of Phoenix, Arizona.

The ASPC-Douglas, adjacent to the Bisbee-Douglas airport, first opened as the Cochise Correctional Training Facility early in 1984. It now consists of 6 units: Gila, Maricopa, Eggers, Mohave, Papago and the Complex Detention Unit (CDU). Built with inmate assistance to the contractor, the first unit to become operational at ASPC-Douglas, was the Maricopa unit. The next was the Mohave unit. Due to prison overcrowding the Gila unit was built with portable modular housing. In 1984, a law was passed that DUI inmates could not be housed with other inmates. This led to the Papago Unit being purchased from the Desert Inn Motel Company, after which it was converted into a prison unit. A special Detention unit was also added.

ASPC-Douglas has an inmate capacity of approximately 2,148 in 5 housing units at security levels 2, 3 and 5. The ADC uses a score classification system to assess inmates appropriate custody and security level placement. The scores range from 1 to 5 with 5 being the highest risk or need. ASPC-Douglas is a modern, medium to high security prison.

| ASPC Unit | Custody Level |
|---|---|
| Gila | 2 |
| Maricopa | 2 |
| Mohave | 3 |
| Complex Detention | 5 |
| Papago DUI | 2 |

== See also ==
- List of U.S. state prisons
- List of Arizona state prisons
