= Arizona State Prison Complex – Winslow =

Prison facility operated by the Arizona Department of Corrections

Coordinates: 34°59′5″N 110°43′13″W

- Interactive map of Arizona State Prison Complex – Winslow
- Location: Winslow, Arizona
- Status: open
- Security class: mixed
- Capacity: 1,928
- Opened: 1990
- Managed by: Arizona Department of Corrections

Arizona State Prison Complex – Winslow is one of 13 prison facilities operated by the Arizona Department of Corrections (ADC). ASPC-Winslow is located in Winslow, Navajo County, Arizona, 203 miles northeast from the state capital of Phoenix, Arizona.

ASPC-Winslow includes a minimum security unit near St Johns and has an inmate capacity of approximately 1,928 in 3 housing units and 2 special housing units at security levels 2, 4, and 5. The ADC uses a score classification system to assess inmates appropriate custody and security level placement. The scores range from 1 to 5 with 5 being the highest risk or need. ASPC-Winslow is a medium to high security prison.

ASPC Unit	Custody Level
Coronado	2
Kaibab	4
Complex Detention	5
Apache	2
Apache Detention	5

== See also ==
- List of U.S. state prisons
- List of Arizona state prisons
