= Scott Lehr =

American convicted serial killer and serial rapist on Arizona's death row

Scott Alan Lehr
- 1992 booking photo of Lehr
- Born: July 6, 1959 (age 67); Wisconsin, U.S.
- Status: Incarcerated on death row in Arizona
- Convictions: First-degree murder (x3); Aggravated assault Sexual assault (x15); Sexual conduct with a minor (x8); Attempted murder (x3); Kidnapping (x7)
- Penalty: Death

Details
- Victims: 3-5 murdered 17 raped
- Date: November 1991–February 1992
- Country: United States
- Location: Phoenix, Arizona
- Imprisoned at: Tucson State Prison

Scott Alan Lehr (born July 6, 1959), dubbed the Baby Seat Rapist, is an American convicted serial killer and serial rapist who was sentenced to death for the murders of three women in Phoenix, Arizona. Lehr first killed 40-year-old Margaret Christorf in November 1991, before he killed 21-year-old Belinda Cronin in January 1992, as well as 19-year-old Michelle Morales in February 1992. Lehr also committed the non-fatal rapes of 17 women and girls between 1991 and 1992. Lehr, who was arrested in June 1992, was found guilty of first-degree murder on all three counts and sentenced to death. He is currently on death row awaiting his execution in Arizona.

== Murders and rapes ==
=== Homicides ===
Between November 1991 and February 1992, Scott Alan Lehr committed the rapes and murders of three women in Phoenix, Arizona.

On November 8, 1991, Lehr first killed 40-year-old Margaret Christorf (also spelt Margaret Chrisdorf), who was last seen in the morning at a convenience store nearby the local Indian School. Christorf was raped by Lehr, who later bludgeoned her in the head with two rocks, and she died due to fatal blunt force trauma to the head. On the same day, Christorf's body was found lying on a dirt road in an orchard, with her clothes being partially removed. Traces of semen were later detected, and the DNA matched to that of Lehr.

On January 20, 1992, 21-year-old Belinda Cronin became the second to be killed by Lehr. Cronin, who was last seen leaving her apartment that night to hitchhike to a friend's house, encountered Lehr, who took her into his car and later raped and killed her by bludgeoning. Cronin's body was not found until almost six months later in June 1992, with her corpse badly decomposed and missing both legs and one arm, and her clothes, including a sweater, underwear and jeans, scattered near a canal where her body was left behind. According to autopsy findings, Cronin died as a result of blunt force trauma to her head and her skull was fractured. At the time of her death, Cronin, who was divorced, left behind a son.

On February 7, 1992, 19-year-old Michelle Marie Morales was the third and final victim to be murdered. Morales, who was last seen nearby a convenience store, was raped and bludgeoned to death by Lehr with a rock, and her body was found two weeks later in a deserted area. Reportedly, Morales was only wearing her shirt and there were bruises around her vaginal area, as well as a fractured skull and lacerations on her scalp. Like both Cronin and Christorf, Morales also died due to lethal blunt force trauma to her head, and despite the inconclusive findings, DNA test results revealed that Lehr was a possible contributor of the semen found in Morales's anal area.

=== Rape cases ===
In addition to the murders, Lehr also assaulted and raped 17 women and girls aged between 10 and 48. Seven of these cases were detailed in court documents, with the victims addressed only by their initials.

On February 13, 1991, a 48-year-old woman, known as W.C. in court documents, accepted a ride from Lehr, who took her to a secluded area and raped her, and forcibly performed oral sex on her. W.C. was later shoved into a ravine and left behind by Lehr.

On February 23, 1991, an 18-year-old girl, known as T.H. in court documents, accepted a ride from Lehr, who agreed to bring her to her destination. Instead, Lehr took her to a freeway and entered a desert, where he forcibly performed anal sex and raped the girl. When the girl refused to have oral sex with him, Lehr threw rocks at T.H. and one of them hit her chest, but the girl managed to flee the scene.

On March 23, 1991, a 34-year-old woman, known as S.G. in court documents, encountered Lehr while waiting at a bus stop, and she got into his car after accepting his ride offer. However, he took her to a desert and raped the woman, and even used his fingers to sexually penetrate her. Afterwards, the woman was released.

On April 4, 1991, a 21-year-old woman, known as C.Z. in court documents, met Lehr and he offered to give her a ride. After this, the woman was taken to a dirt road, where she was raped, molested and forced to engage in oral sex. Lehr also choked her and used a rock to hit her head several times. The victim survived the attack.

On October 24, 1991, a 13-year-old girl, known as J.T. in court documents, accepted a ride from Lehr, who took her to the desert and raped her. Lehr performed oral sex on the girl and hit her head against the ground, and choked her until she lost consciousness. Lehr left her behind and drove off; the girl survived the attack.

On November 18, 1991, a 10-year-old girl, known as J.A. in court documents, was picked up by Lehr, who offered her a ride, and later drove to a convenience store to buy soft drink and a bottle of hand lotion. Afterwards, the girl was taken to the desert, where she was raped and forced to perform oral sex; Lehr also rubbed lotion onto the victim's private parts before the rape. After the gruesome acts, the girl was left behind in the desert.

On February 23, 1992, a 14-year-old girl, known as E.R. in court documents, entered Lehr's car after she accepted a ride from him. However, Lehr drove out of the city and reached a dirt road, where he forced the girl to perform oral sex before raping her. Lehr also used a heavy object to bludgeon her on the head and later left her behind. The girl was found alive the next day.

=== Modus operandi ===
For all the killings and rapes he committed, Lehr was noted to have often picked up his victims by offering to give them a ride, pretending to show concern for their safety. He also randomly selected his victims, mainly women or girls who hitchhiked or walking alone on the streets, and also would rape and assault them. The surviving victims noted that there was a baby seat in the back of Lehr's car, and as a result, Lehr was dubbed the "Baby Seat Rapist" by the media.

=== Suspected connection to other cases ===
Lehr was named a suspect behind the disappearance of 13-year-old Brandy Lynn Myers, but no charges were made against him pertaining to the case.

In November 2023, Lehr was named a suspect behind another possible homicide. In this case, the police identified the skeletal remains of a teenage girl, initially dubbed the "Apache Junction Jane Doe", as 15-year-old Melody Harrison. Harrison had been found dead in June 1992, but her remains went unidentified for more than 30 years until DNA testing confirmed her identity. Her death was ruled a homicide, and investigators believed she may have been the victim of a serial killer. Both Lehr and another known serial killer, Bryan Patrick Miller, were considered potential suspects in her murder. Miller was subsequently sentenced to death in 2023 for two of the killings he was charged for.

== Arrest and charges ==
On June 27, 1992, four months after killing Morales, 32-year-old Scott Lehr was arrested for the rapes and murders he committed throughout the past year.

According to the police, the surviving rape victims testified that their attacker had a baby seat at the back of the car, and some stated that the offender drove a Nissan while others described the vehicle as a Chevrolet Caprice. One victim also told the police that the car license number was "ADW-515" while another claimed it was "ADW-519". The police uncovered that Lehr originally drove a Chevrolet Caprice before he changed to a Nissan after his wife accidentally wrecked his previous car, and Lehr's Nissan was the only vehicle registered with an "ADW" based on records from the Arizona Department of Public Safety and Motor Vehicle Division. Lehr's car license number was "ADW-015", which was one digit off the description of one victim. Lehr was also identified by some of the surviving victims after police showed them his photograph obtained from his driver's license records.

In July 1992, the police were able to locate the Chevrolet Caprice, which Lehr drove to find and pick up potential victims to rape and kill.

== Trial and sentencing ==
On July 8, 1992, a Maricopa County grand jury formally indicted Lehr for three counts of first-degree murder and 36 counts of rape and other sexual offences. That same month, a tentative trial date of September 29, 1992, was scheduled for Lehr.

On July 17, 1992, the prosecution officially announced they would seek the death penalty for Lehr.

On November 26, 1996, four years after his arrest, a Maricopa County Superior Court jury convicted Lehr of all three counts of first-degree murder, as well as multiple charges of rape and sexual offences against the three murder victims and seven other women.

On August 8, 1997, 38-year-old Scott Lehr was sentenced to death for all three murders upon the jury's unanimous recommendation for capital punishment. Apart from the three death sentences, Lehr was also sentenced to 17 consecutive life sentences (or 947 years in prison) for 32 counts of raping, kidnapping and assaulting (and attempted murder for some) the 17 rape victims.

== Appeals and death row ==
As of January 1, 2003, Lehr was listed among the 122 prisoners held on death row in Arizona.

A 2014 report revealed that Lehr was one of 113 inmates held on death row in Arizona.

As of 2021, Lehr was one of 114 inmates on Arizona's death row. As of October 2022, when the state sought a death warrant for death row inmate Murray Hooper, Lehr was one of 111 prisoners remaining on Arizona's death row.

=== First appeals and re-trial ===
On January 30, 2002, the Arizona Supreme Court allowed the first appeal of Lehr and overturned two of his death sentences and conviction for the killings of both Michelle Morales and Margaret Christorf, and further ordered a re-trial for these cases. However, the third death sentence for the murder of Belinda Cronin was upheld after the court found it appropriate. This judgement was made in light of a 2002 landmark ruling by the U.S. Supreme Court, which ruled that only juries, not judges, should impose death sentences.

On April 30, 2003, the Arizona Supreme Court allowed the second appeal of Lehr against his remaining death sentence for the murder of Belinda Cronin and vacated it, and remitted his case back to the trial court for re-sentencing.

On April 17, 2009, Lehr was once again sentenced to death for both the murders of Margaret Christorf and Michelle Morales. However, the jury deadlocked on the death penalty for the third charge of killing Belinda Cronin, and as a result, the prosecution chose to take the death penalty off the table and not pursue another re-sentencing trial, and Lehr was thus sentenced to life imprisonment for Cronin's murder.

=== Further appeals ===
On July 13, 2011, the Arizona Supreme Court rejected Lehr's appeal against his two death sentences.

On January 11, 2019, Lehr's appeal for post-conviction relief was denied by the Maricopa County Superior Court.

On September 25, 2023, the U.S. District Court for the District of Arizona dismissed Lehr's petition for post-conviction relief.

On July 1, 2024, the U.S. District Court for the District of Arizona dismissed Lehr's appeal against his death sentence.

== See also ==
- Capital punishment in Arizona
- List of serial killers in the United States
- List of death row inmates in the United States § Arizona
