= Arizona State Prison Complex – Eyman =

Prison in Arizona, United States

Coordinates: 33°02′13″N 111°19′50″W

- Interactive map of Arizona State Prison Complex – Eyman
- Location: Florence, Arizona
- Status: open
- Security class: mixed
- Capacity: 4,549
- Opened: 1991
- Managed by: Arizona Department of Corrections

Arizona State Prison Complex – Eyman is a state prison for men located in Florence, Arizona. Eyman is one of 13 prison facilities operated by the Arizona Department of Corrections (ADC).

On May 3, 1991, Governor Fife Symington provided an opening address, officially opening ASPC–Eyman. In addition, ASPC–Eyman/Rynning Unit also officially opened. The complex was named after Frank Eyman who was a Warden at Florence. The Meadows Unit was named after Della Meadows who worked 35 years as the Wardens' secretary during her tenure with the Arizona Department of Corrections. Special Management Unit II (SMU II) was renamed Browning Unit on June 2, 2008, after Army Staff Sgt. Charles R. Browning, who died serving in Afghanistan and worked at SMU II.

ASPC–Eyman has an inmate capacity of approximately 4,544 in 8 housing units at security levels 3, 4 and 5. The ADC uses a score classification system to assess inmates appropriate custody and security level placement. The scores range from 2 to 5, with 5 being the highest risk or need. ASPC–Eyman is a modern, medium to high security prison.

Browning Unit (Formerly SMU II) in Eyman contains Arizona's one of two male death row cell blocks. The execution chamber for the State of Arizona is located at the Central Unit of the Arizona State Prison Complex – Florence.

ASPC Unit	Custody Level
Cook	3
Meadows	3
Rynning	3-4
SMU I	5
SMU I PS	5
Browning	5
Browning Minors	5
Browning Mental Health	5

== Notable inmates ==
- Mark Goudeau – Serial killer known as The Baseline Killer. Sentenced to death.
- Dale Hausner – Serial killer. Sentenced to death. Committed suicide in prison in 2013.
- Leroy Nash – Murderer sentenced to death. Died of natural causes on February 12, 2010, at the age of 94. Oldest prisoner in Arizona at time of death.
- Richard Djerf – Murderer sentenced to death. Executed on October 17, 2025.

== See also ==
- Prison
- List of U.S. state prisons
- List of Arizona state prisons
