= Arizona State Prison Florence-West =

Prison facility operated for the Arizona Department of Corrections

Coordinates: 33.0372°N 111.3765°W

- Interactive map of Arizona State Prison Florence-West
- Location: Florence, Arizona
- Status: open
- Security class: security level 2
- Capacity: 775
- Opened: 1997
- Managed by: GEO Group

Arizona State Prison Florence-West is one of 13 prison facilities, a private prison on contract with the Arizona Department of Corrections (ADC), designated for male inmates who have demonstrated a need for substance abuse treatment. ASP Florence West is located in Florence, Pinal County, Arizona, 65 miles east from the state capital of Phoenix, Arizona. The facility is operated by the GEO Group.

ASP Florence West has an inmate capacity of approximately 775 in 2 housing dorms at security level 2. The ADC uses a score classification system to assess inmates appropriate custody and security level placement. The scores range from 1 to 5 with 5 being the highest risk or need. ASP Florence West is a secure, minimum custody private prison.

ASP Dorm	Custody Level
3 (RTC)	2
4 (DUI)	2

== See also ==
- List of U.S. state prisons
- List of Arizona state prisons
