= Arizona State Prison Complex – Safford =

Prison facility operated by the Arizona Department of Corrections

Coordinates: 32°49′42″N 109°33′48″W

- Interactive map of Arizona State Prison Complex – Safford
- Location: Safford, Arizona
- Status: open
- Security class: mixed
- Capacity: 1717
- Opened: 1968
- Managed by: Arizona Department of Corrections

Arizona State Prison Complex – Safford is one of 13 prison facilities operated by the Arizona Department of Corrections (ADC). ASPC-Safford is located in Safford, Graham County, Arizona, 173 miles southeast of the state capital of Phoenix, Arizona.

== History ==
In 1968, the Arizona State Legislature passed a bill making the Fort Grant State Industrial School a part of the State's Department of Corrections. In 1973, Fort Grant became an adult male prison. In December 1997, the Arizona State Prison at Fort Grant became the Fort Grant Unit of ASPC-Safford.

Designated as a prison complex, Safford had its beginnings as a Department facility in 1970. Then called the Safford Conservation Center, it was a minimum security work camp that housed 185 adult male inmates in tents and Quonset huts before any permanent buildings were erected, the first one a 48-man dormitory constructed in 1976. Two 64-man dormitories were completed by 1983.

The 1986–87 building program added 100EBUs, in the form of Quonset huts, to expand the capacity of the unit. Today, the prison has a designated capacity of 730 and the Graham and Tonto units house adult male minimum security inmates, the majority working in the community or for other government agencies.

== Population ==
ASPC-Safford has an inmate capacity of approximately 1,717 in 3 housing units at security levels 2 and 3. The ADC uses a score classification system to assess inmates' appropriate custody and security level placement. The scores range from 1 to 5 with 5 being the highest risk or need.

ASPC Unit	Custody Level
Graham	2
Tonto	3
Fort Grant	2

== Human rights abuses ==
Amnesty International has singled out the prison as an example of human rights violations in US prisons. In an incident in August 1995 at the Graham Unit, 600 prisoners were "forced by guards to remain outdoors, handcuffed, for 96 hours, required to defecate and urinate in their clothes. Many suffered severe sunburn, heat exhaustion and dehydration in the intense heat."

== Notable Inmates ==
Inmate Name	Register Number	Status	Details
Samuel John Dieteman	111193	Serving a life sentence without parole.	Convicted, along with his accomplice, Dale Hausner, of mulitiple murders and shootings in the Phoenix area between 2005-2006.

== See also ==
- List of U.S. state prisons
- List of Arizona state prisons
