= Murder of Dale Harrell =

2009 incident in Maricopa County, Arizona

The murder of Dale Harrell (December 18, 1974 – February 9, 2009) occurred after he was fatally attacked on January 14, 2009, by his wife Marissa-Suzanne "Reese" DeVault (born November 6, 1977) in Maricopa County, Arizona, US. Though she faced the possibility of a death penalty for her crime, DeVault was sentenced to life in prison. She is imprisoned at Perryville within the Arizona Department of Corrections.

Her trial made national and global headlines. The case was noted as being very similar to that of the murder of Travis Alexander by Jodi Arias, with whom DeVault was in contact and whose murder trial occurred in the same courthouse one year earlier.

== Murder and investigation ==
On January 14, 2009, DeVault entered the master bedroom she and Harrell shared at their home in Gilbert, Arizona. She then struck Harrell several times in the head while he was sleeping. Harrell received multiple skull fractures and was taken to the hospital. DeVault initially claimed that Harrell was beaten by an unknown assailant who had broken into the home. She later confessed that she had beaten Harrell as an act of self-defense and alleged that Harrell was physically and sexually abusive. DeVault was arrested the same night on charges of aggravated assault and was held at a local jail, but was later released on bail. Officers noted that DeVault had reddened marks upon her neck and that they had found a hammer covered with blood at the crime scene. In early February 2009, DeVault was indicted for attempted murder and released on bond.

On February 9, 2009, Harrell died of his wounds and a grand jury indicted DeVault for first-degree murder. At 3:00 the next morning, DeVault was assaulted by an unknown assailant as she was jogging, suffering a broken jaw and ankle. Following the beating, police investigated a man who lived with DeVault, Stanley Cook, Jr., and found dirty, bloody clothing.

Both DeVault and Cook initially told police that Cook had killed Harrell. Cook had a brain injury that caused him to suffer from short-term memory loss— neither he nor DeVault could provide details concerning his involvement. Police found no evidence linking Cook to the crime; indeed, forensic evidence ruled out Cook had been the assailant. When confronted with this fact, DeVault confessed that she had bludgeoned her husband with the hammer.

After Harrell was cremated at a Mesa mortuary, DeVault refused to give the remains to his parents, who then filed a civil suit against her for Harrell's remains and punitive damages. DeVault filed a 300-page confession with the Gilbert police where she detailed the years of alleged abuse, stating that Harrell had beaten and raped her on January 14, prompting her to assault him with the hammer. She also reported that Harrell had frequently sent her to the hospital and that he had once, in front of several witnesses, shoved her and dislocated her shoulder, which one of the witnesses helped pop back into place. During this time, police interviewed friends of DeVault and Harrell. The police found that they had no evidence to corroborate claims that Harrell had been abusive towards DeVault. They also mentioned that DeVault had lied to them in the past about receiving a large inheritance from the death of her stepfather, who was in fact not deceased.

DeVault was also discovered to have lied about an older lover she was seeing, Allen Flores. She borrowed over US$300,000 from Flores, who had been introduced to police as an ex-lover of her stepfather. Flores' house was searched twice, and the police located a computer with child pornography on it. Flores later agreed to testify on the Harrell murder in exchange for full immunity over the pornography charges.

== Trial ==
DeVault was initially set to go to trial in 2011, but the trial was postponed. The prosecutors in the case sought the death penalty. Defense attorneys stated that DeVault had battered woman syndrome and post-traumatic stress disorder, which they used to argue against the death penalty. Jury selection for the new trial began in January 2014, where Judge Roland Steinle commented that he did not want anyone on the jury who had been overly focused on the Jodi Arias trial. The trial for DeVault officially began on January 22, 2014, and was expected to run until April.

In their opening statements, the defense and prosecutors posed different reasons as to DeVault's motivations for beating Harrell with a hammer. Prosecutors alleged that DeVault killed Harrell with the intention of collecting a total of US$1,250,000 from two life insurance policies so she could repay Allen Flores the US$300,000 she had borrowed from him, while DeVault's defense attorneys claimed that DeVault acted in self-defense.

The defense also stated that DeVault had experienced abuse as a child and that her mother had physically abused her, while her stepfather had sexually abused her. Dr. Jon Conte, a clinical psychologist that was also knowledgeable about the effects of child abuse, testified on behalf of the defense, stating that he believed that DeVault's actions were consistent with a long history of childhood abuse. One of DeVault's children testified that she had witnessed Harrell abuse her mother. The prosecution countered this with testimony from clinical psychologist Dr. Janeen DeMarte, who diagnosed DeVault as having antisocial personality disorder. She also questioned why DeVault would give custody of her children to her mother and stepfather after DeVault had earlier claimed that they had abused her. The prosecution also pointed out that DeVault had initially claimed that an unknown assailant had broken into the home and assaulted Harrell, before confessing that she was the perpetrator.

On April 8, 2014, DeVault was found guilty of first-degree premeditated murder for the death of Harrell. The jury found that excessive cruelty had been used, which made DeVault eligible for the death penalty. In a statement to the court, DeVault apologized for the murder, saying that she was "sorry, not only for my actions but for everyone I hurt". She also addressed Harrell's parents, stating, "My heart goes out to them...his mother and father have had to experience the worst loss in the world – the loss of a child. I know there is nothing I can say that will ever ease their pain."

=== Sentencing ===
The penalty phase of the trial commenced on April 15, and deliberations began on April 22. The jury sentenced DeVault to life in prison instead of the death penalty, and Maricopa County Attorney Bill Montgomery stated that "imposing the death penalty in any circumstance is difficult, and in this one, the jurors felt that a life sentence was appropriate". On June 6, 2014, the judge sentenced DeVault to life in prison without the possibility of parole.
