= Federal Correctional Complex, Tucson =

Prison complex in Arizona

Coordinates: 32.08611°N 110.85798°W

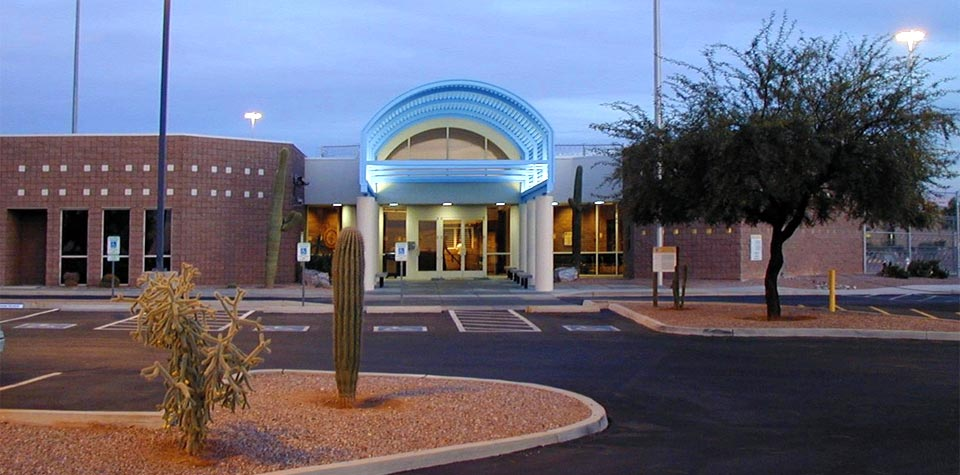
- Interactive map of Federal Correctional Complex, Tucson
- Location: Tucson, Arizona
- Status: Operational
- Security class: High, medium and minimum-security
- Population: 2,500 (two facilities and prison camp)
- Managed by: Federal Bureau of Prisons

The Federal Correctional Complex, Tucson (FCC Tucson) is a United States federal prison complex for male inmates in Arizona. It is operated by the Federal Bureau of Prisons, a division of the United States Department of Justice.

The complex consists of two facilities:

- Federal Correctional Institution, Tucson (FCI Tucson): a medium-security facility.
- United States Penitentiary, Tucson (USP Tucson): a high-security facility with a satellite prison camp for minimum-security inmates.

== History and facility ==
About 520 employees are required to staff the entire federal complex with additional labor provided by the minimum-security camp. The opening of the U.S. Penitentiary in February 2007 worsened a local shortage of prison officers, drawing some staff away from the nearby state prison complex operated by the Arizona Department of Corrections, also on Wilmot Road.

== See also ==
- List of U.S. federal prisons
- Federal Bureau of Prisons
- Incarceration in the United States
