= Murder of Gary Triano =

Murder of American businessman Gary Triano

Gary Lee Triano
- Born: November 6, 1943
- Died: November 1, 1996 (aged 52); Catalina Foothills, Arizona
- Occupation: Real estate developer
- Spouses: Mary Cram (m. 196?; div. 198?); Pamela Phillips (m. 1986; div. 1993)
- Partner: Robin Gardner (1994-1996; his death)
- Children: 5

Gary Lee Triano (November 6, 1943 – November 1, 1996) was an American real estate developer from Tucson, Arizona who was killed in Catalina Foothills by a pipe bomb explosion in his 1989 Lincoln Town Car on November 1, 1996. His former wife, Pamela Anne Phillips, a one-time model, real estate agent, and socialite, was charged with orchestrating her ex-husband's death. In a sensational trial nearly 18 years after Triano's murder, Phillips was convicted of first-degree murder and conspiracy to commit murder and was sentenced to life in prison. Phillips, who is now incarcerated at the Arizona State Prison Complex – Perryville, claims that Triano's death was a mob revenge killing. Ronald Young, who was hired by Phillips as a hit man, was also convicted and sentenced to life in prison.

== Background ==
Gary Triano was a longtime Tucson, Arizona resident. He graduated from Rincon High School and earned a degree in accounting from the University of Arizona. He also attended the University of Arizona's law school. He married Mary Cram, and they had two children, Heather and Brian.

In 1978, he was executive producer of the movie The Mafu Cage.

Triano married his second wife, Pamela Phillips, on October 4, 1986, in San Diego, California. During their marriage, the couple had two children, Trevor and Lois, before their bitter divorce in 1993. At the time of the divorce, Triano filed for Chapter 11 bankruptcy, claiming $40 million in debt after several failed business dealings regarding Indian casinos. Phillips moved to Aspen, Colorado with the couple's two children, where she continued her career in commercial real estate.

== Murder ==
On November 1, 1996, Gary Triano was killed when a pipe bomb exploded in his car at the La Paloma Country Club in Catalina Foothills, Arizona. Within weeks, the investigation centered around his ex-wife Pamela Phillips, who was still living in Aspen. It was discovered that she had taken out a $2 million life insurance policy on Triano shortly before his death. The couple's two children were the beneficiaries of the policy, which was paid out to Phillips in 1997. Evidence also linked Phillips to Ronald Young, a small-time criminal with whom Phillips developed a relationship while in Aspen. Shortly before the bombing, a van rented by Young was found abandoned in Yorba Linda, California, and inside the vehicle, there were documents pertaining to Phillips and Triano's divorce, a map of Tucson, Arizona, and a sawed-off shotgun.

Nine years after the murder, on November 19, 2005, an episode of America's Most Wanted profiled Ronald Young, who was then wanted for forgery and embezzlement. The episode also mentioned his suspected involvement in Triano's death. Two days later, Young was apprehended in Fort Lauderdale, Florida. He served a 10-month sentence in federal prison for weapon possession before being extradited to Aspen. Following Young's arrest, investigators found records of phone calls and email correspondence between Young and Phillips related to Triano's murder.

In 2008, Ronald Young was charged with the murder of Gary Triano. On December 3, 2009, Pamela Phillips was also arrested for Triano's murder in Vienna, Austria, when she fled after her indictment in October 2008. She was later returned to the United States to stand trial.

== Trials ==
Ronald Young went to trial for Gary Triano's murder in 2010. Prosecutors showed records that Phillips agreed to give Young $400,000 to kill her ex-husband. The tapes and recordings outlining the conspiracy were also introduced into the evidence. After his trial, Young was convicted of first-degree murder and conspiracy to commit murder. He was sentenced to two life terms.

Following her extradition to Arizona to stand trial, Pamela Phillips was held on a $5 million bond at the Pima County Jail. In December 2011, she was initially ruled mentally incompetent for trial. In October 2012, she was ruled competent to stand trial after undergoing treatment at the jail.

Phillips' trial began in 2014 and lasted for seven weeks. Prosecutors used similar evidence in her trial to convict Young. Phillips was convicted of first-degree murder and conspiracy. Like Young, she was also sentenced to life in prison; she has no possibility for parole.

== In the media ==
The murder of Gary Triano has been televised on several programs, including Dateline NBC, Dateline on ID, 48 Hours, 20/20, Snapped, American Greed (2015 episode "A Widow's Web"), Fatal Vows and Vengeance: Killer Millionaires.

In January 2012, the case was the subject of a true crime book by Kerie Droban.
