= Arizona State Prison Complex – Perryville =

Prison facility operated by the Arizona Department of Corrections

- Location in the United States Location in Arizona
- Location: Goodyear, Arizona, U.S.; 33°28′14″N 112°26′30″W
- Status: Operational
- Security class: mixed, female
- Capacity: 4,600
- Opened: 1981; 45 years ago
- Managed by: Arizona Department of Corrections (ADCRR)
- Warden: Kathleen Reyes
- Website: corrections.az.gov/perryville

Arizona State Prison Complex – Perryville is one of 13 prison facilities operated by the Arizona Department of Corrections, Rehabilitation & Reentry (ADCRR). ASPC-Perryville is located in Goodyear, Arizona.

ASPC-Perryville has an inmate capacity of approximately 4,382 in 8 housing units and 2 special use units at security levels 2, 3, 4 and 5. The ADC uses a score classification system to assess inmates appropriate custody and security level placement. The scores range from 1 to 5, with 5 being the highest risk or need. ASPC-Perryville is a modern, mixed security prison. ASPC-Perryville's Lumley Unit houses the female death row.

== History ==
In 1981, three units of the Perryville Complex, San Pedro, Santa Cruz, and San Juan (since renamed Lumley Unit), for minimum and medium custody male inmates were opened. In May 1982, Santa Maria Unit, for all custody levels of female inmates, began admitting inmates. ASP-Yuma, a 250-bed adult male prison which opened in 1987 became a part of the Perryville Complex in October 1992 until November 1995 when it became its own prison complex Arizona State Prison Complex - Yuma.

ASPC-Perryville was converted to an all female facility in 2000. That same year the San Juan housing unit was renamed in honor of Brent W. Lumley, an ADC correctional officer who was killed in the line of duty in the unit.

In 2019 many news sources reported on prisoners’ experiences seeing and opening packages of food products which stated that human beings were not intended to consume the items.

=== Death of Marcia Powell ===
Marcia Powell was a 48-year-old inmate who died May 20, 2009, after exposure to 107 °F temperatures for four hours in an outside cage at Perryville Prison. Prison policy limits such outside confinement to a maximum of two hours. An autopsy report showed that Powell had first- and second-degree burns and a core body temperature of 108 degrees. She suffered burn blisters all over her body. The county medical examiner found the cause of death to be due to complications from heat exposure.

== Notable prisoners ==
Inmate Name	Register Number	Status	Details
Jodi Arias	281129	Serving a life sentence without the possibility of parole.	Convicted of the 2008 Murder of Travis Alexander, her ex-boyfriend.
Marissa DeVault	291755	Serving a life sentence without the possibility of parole.	Convicted in the 2009 murder of her husband, Dale Harrell, in a case that was noted as being very similar to that of the previously mentioned murder committed by Arias.
Marjorie Orbin	250060	Serving a life sentence without the possibility of parole.	Convicted of the 2004 murder and dismemberment of her husband, Jay Orbin.
Pamela Anne Phillips	291488	Serving a life sentence without the possibility of parole.	Convicted of orchestrating the 1996 Murder of Gary Triano her ex-husband, in which he was killed by a pipe-bomb.

=== On Death Row ===
- Wendi Andriano – Andriano was convicted of the murder of her husband Joe Andriano. Her 33-year-old husband Joe, who was dying of cancer, was bludgeoned and stabbed to death in the couple's apartment in Ahwatukee, Arizona. His autopsy revealed that he had sustained 23 blows to the skull, and traces of sodium azide (a toxin similar in activity to cyanide) were also found in his system.
- Shawna Forde – on May 30, 2009, 29-year-old Raul Flores and his daughter, Brisenia, 9, of Arivaca, Arizona, were killed at home during a home invasion by Forde, Jason Eugene Bush, and Albert Gaxiola.
- Sammantha Allen – on July 12, 2011, police officers were called to Ame Deal's home, where she was found dead in a small footlocker, having suffocated.

== See also ==
- Lists of United States state prisons
- List of Arizona state prisons
