= Marjorie Ann Orbin =

American murderer (born 1961)

- Born: October 29, 1961 (age 64); Boulder City, Nevada
- Spouse: Jay Orbin
- Status: Imprisoned
- Convictions: First degree murder Theft (2 counts); Fraudulent schemes and artifices (2 counts)
- Penalty: Life without parole

Marjorie Ann Orbin (born October 29, 1961) is an American woman who murdered her husband Jay Orbin in Phoenix, Arizona, on or about September 8, 2004, which would have been his 45th birthday. Jay Orbin was a jewelry dealer. In September 2004 he returned home to Phoenix from a road trip to Florida. Police said he arrived at his home on September 8, based on cell phone and credit-card records. He was never seen alive again.

== Murder and conviction ==
Prior to her crime, Marjorie Orbin was a 43-year-old former Las Vegas showgirl. According to officials, she had been having affairs with several men. When Jay Orbin returned home from a business trip, investigators believe his wife shot and killed him, then dismembered his body with jigsaw blades in an attempt to keep the affairs a secret and inherit Jay's money. The husband's body was found several weeks later, when his torso was discovered on October 23 in a plastic container on the outskirts of Phoenix. The rest of his body was never found.

Orbin was convicted of the murder in 2009 after a trial lasting eight months.

On October 1, 2009, Marjorie Orbin was sentenced to life imprisonment without the possibility of parole by an Arizona court. She is currently serving her time at the Arizona State Prison Complex – Perryville.

== In media ==
Marjorie Orbin's case was featured in an episode of Killer in Plain Sight, the "Fortune Hunters" episode of Deadly Women, an episode of the CBS newsmagazine 48 Hours and in the investigation series Scorned: Love Kills. A book titled Dancing with Death by author and journalist Shanna Hogan was released about the case in May 2011. Author Camille Kimball released a book about the case in 2010 titled What She Always Wanted. The case was also covered in an episode of Snapped. In August 2016 ReelzChannel show Copycat Killers covered Marjorie Orbin's case in an episode titled "Saw". The case is also covered in an episode of the TV show Corrupt Crimes on the True Crime TV Network.

The Investigation Discovery show Betrayed highlighted Jay Orbin's disappearance and subsequent death in the episode entitled "Life and Limb" on October 19, 2016.
