= Federal Correctional Institution, Tucson =

Medium-security prison in Arizona, US

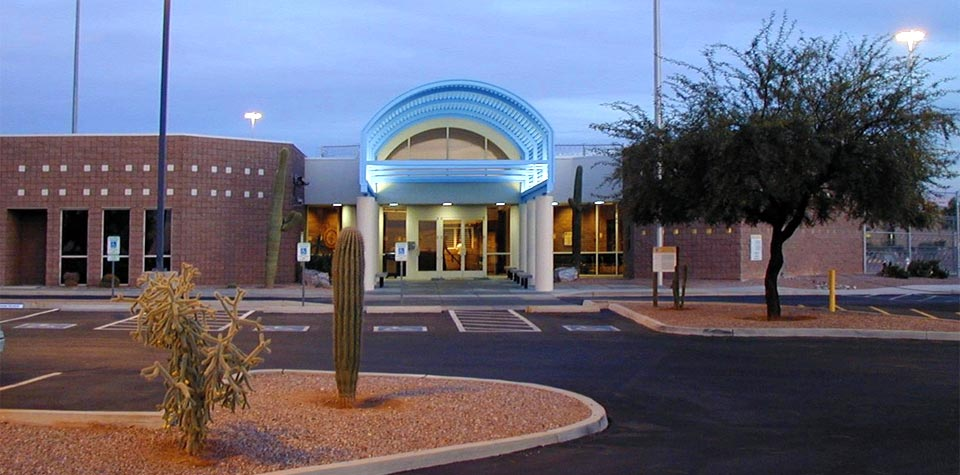
- Interactive map of Federal Correctional Institution, Tucson
- Location: Tucson, Arizona; 32°05′27″N 110°51′29″W
- Status: Operational
- Security class: Medium security
- Population: 795
- Opened: 1982
- Managed by: Federal Bureau of Prisons

The Federal Correctional Institution, Tucson (FCI Tucson) is a medium-security United States federal prison for male inmates with an administrative facility for male and female offenders. It is part of the Tucson Federal Correctional Complex (FCC Tucson) and operated by the Federal Bureau of Prisons, a division of the United States Department of Justice.

FCI Tucson is located within Tucson city limits, 10 miles (16 km) southeast of downtown Tucson.

== History ==
Opened in March 1982, the institution was originally a metropolitan correctional center designed for a capacity of 392 inmates. The staff numbered 237 as of 2002.

In November 2022, an inmate attempted to shoot his wife during a visitation session.

== Facility ==
The facility houses approximately 770 inmates. Males are held in two-person medium security cells, and there is an administrative facility for both male and female offenders. The prison mainly holds pretrial inmates from federal court proceedings in the District of Arizona as well as short term and sentenced inmates awaiting transfer.

== Notable inmates (current and former) ==
†Inmates released prior to 1982 are not listed on the Bureau of Prisons website.

Inmate Name	Register Number	Photo	Status	Details
Charles Keating	97188-012		Released from custody in 1998; served 5 years.	Owner of the now-defunct Lincoln Savings and Loan Association; pleaded guilty to bankruptcy fraud and wire fraud for stealing nearly $1 million from the company prior to its failure in 1989, which cost taxpayers $3.4 billion.
Manuel Henriquez	86705-054		Served a 6-month sentence, released on April 25, 2021.	Pleaded guilty to fraud and bribery, Charged in connection with the 2019 college admissions bribery scandal
Don Black	16692-034		Served a 2 year sentence transferred to FCI, Big Spring; released November 15, 1984	Violation of the Neutrality Act.
Derek Chauvin	47849-509		Transferred to the facility in August 2022. Transferred to FCI Big Spring, Texas, in 2024.	Convicted on several state and federal charges relating to the 2020 murder of George Floyd, among other civil rights charges. Chauvin was stabbed by another inmate on November 24, 2023. Prison employees performed "life-saving" measures before Chauvin was taken to a hospital for evaluation and treatment.
Matthew Muller	72875-097		Scheduled release in 2049.	Perpetrator of 'Gone Girl' kidnapping. Plead guilty and no contest to kidnapping, burglary, forcible rape, battery, assault, and false imprisonment. Some of crimes detailed in American Nightmare.

== See also ==
- List of U.S. federal prisons
- Federal Bureau of Prisons
- Incarceration in the United States
