= Death row =

Place in prison housing inmates awaiting execution

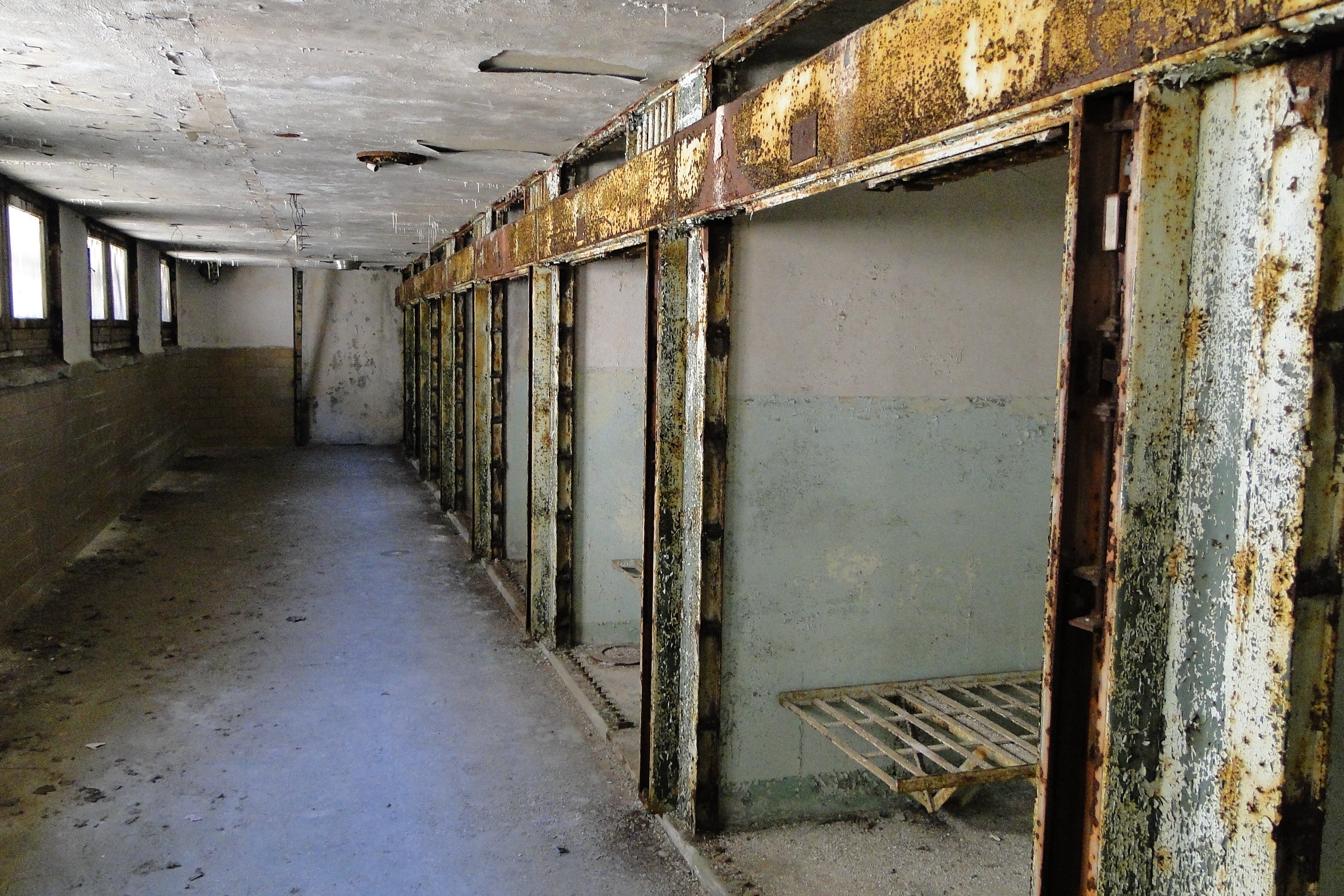
The cellblock that housed death row at Eastern State Penitentiary in Philadelphia

Death row, also known as condemned row, is a place in a prison that houses inmates awaiting execution after being convicted of a capital crime and sentenced to death. The term is also used figuratively to describe the state of awaiting execution ("being on death row"), even in places where no special facility or separate unit for condemned inmates exists. In the United States, after an individual is found guilty of a capital offense in states where execution is a legal penalty, the judge will give the jury the option of imposing a death sentence or life imprisonment without the possibility of parole. It is then up to the jury to decide whether to give the death sentence; this usually has to be a unanimous decision. If the jury agrees on death, the defendant will remain on death row during appeal and habeas corpus procedures, which may continue for several decades.

Opponents of capital punishment claim that a prisoner's isolation and uncertainty over their fate constitute a form of psychological abuse and that especially long-time death row inmates are prone to develop a mental disorder, if they do not already have such a condition. This is referred to as the death row phenomenon. Estimates reveal that five to ten percent of all inmates on death row have a mental health condition. Some inmates may attempt suicide. There have been some calls for a ban on the imposition of the death penalty for inmates with mental illness and also case law such as Atkins v. Virginia to further this. Executions still take place for those with clear intellectual disabilities due to poor legal representation and high standards of proof.

== Etymology ==
In 1933, Giuseppe Zangara attempted to assassinate President-elect Franklin D. Roosevelt. Although he missed Roosevelt, he fatally shot Chicago Mayor Anton Cermak. Zangara was subsequently convicted of Cermak's murder and sentenced to death. At the time, Florida law prohibited housing a condemned inmate in the same cell as another prisoner awaiting execution. As a result, such inmates were required to be held in a separate holding area. At Raiford Prison, where Zangara was incarcerated, one inmate was already occupying the designated "death cell." To accommodate Zangara, the facility expanded the waiting area to include a row of adjacent cells, thus creating what became known as "Death Row."

== United States ==
The absolute number of people on death row, in 2024, per US State as of September 12, 2024. The darker the state, the more people on death row.

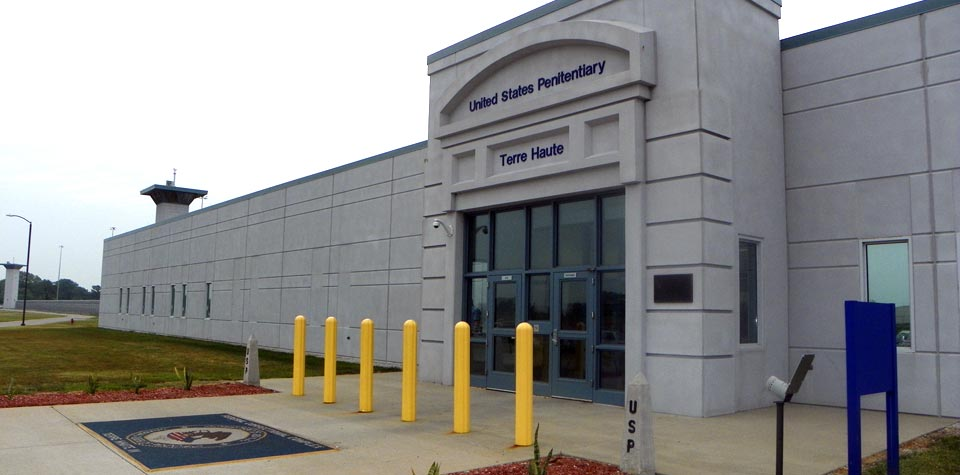
United States Penitentiary, Terre Haute houses all but one male death row prisoners sentenced by the U.S. federal government.

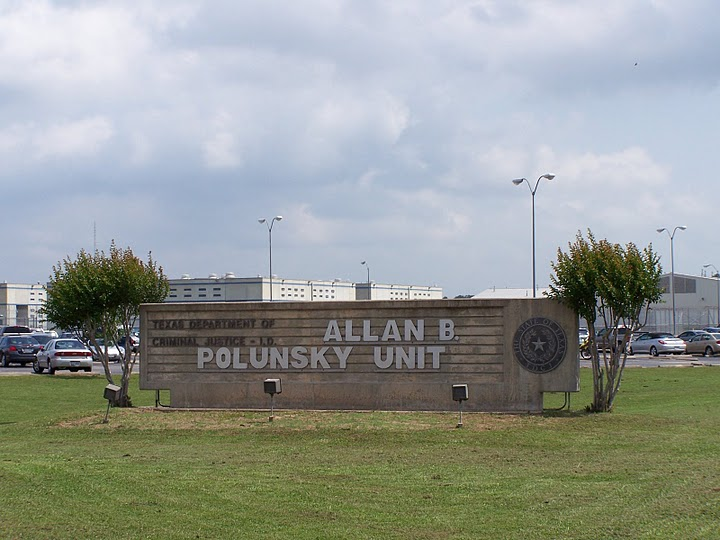
Allan B. Polunsky Unit houses the male death row prisoners sentenced by the U.S. state of Texas.

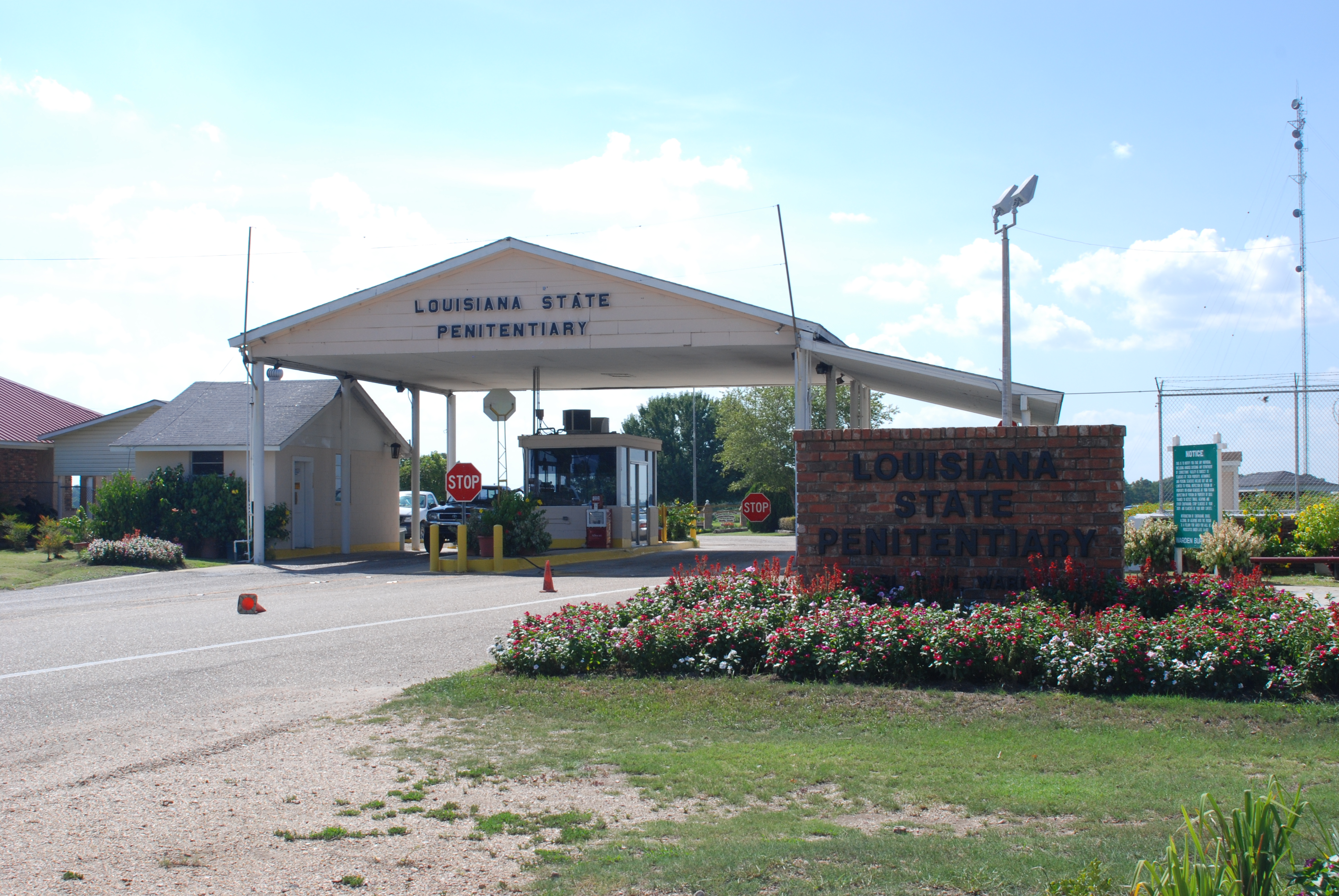
Louisiana State Penitentiary, which houses the male death row prisoners sentenced by the State of Louisiana

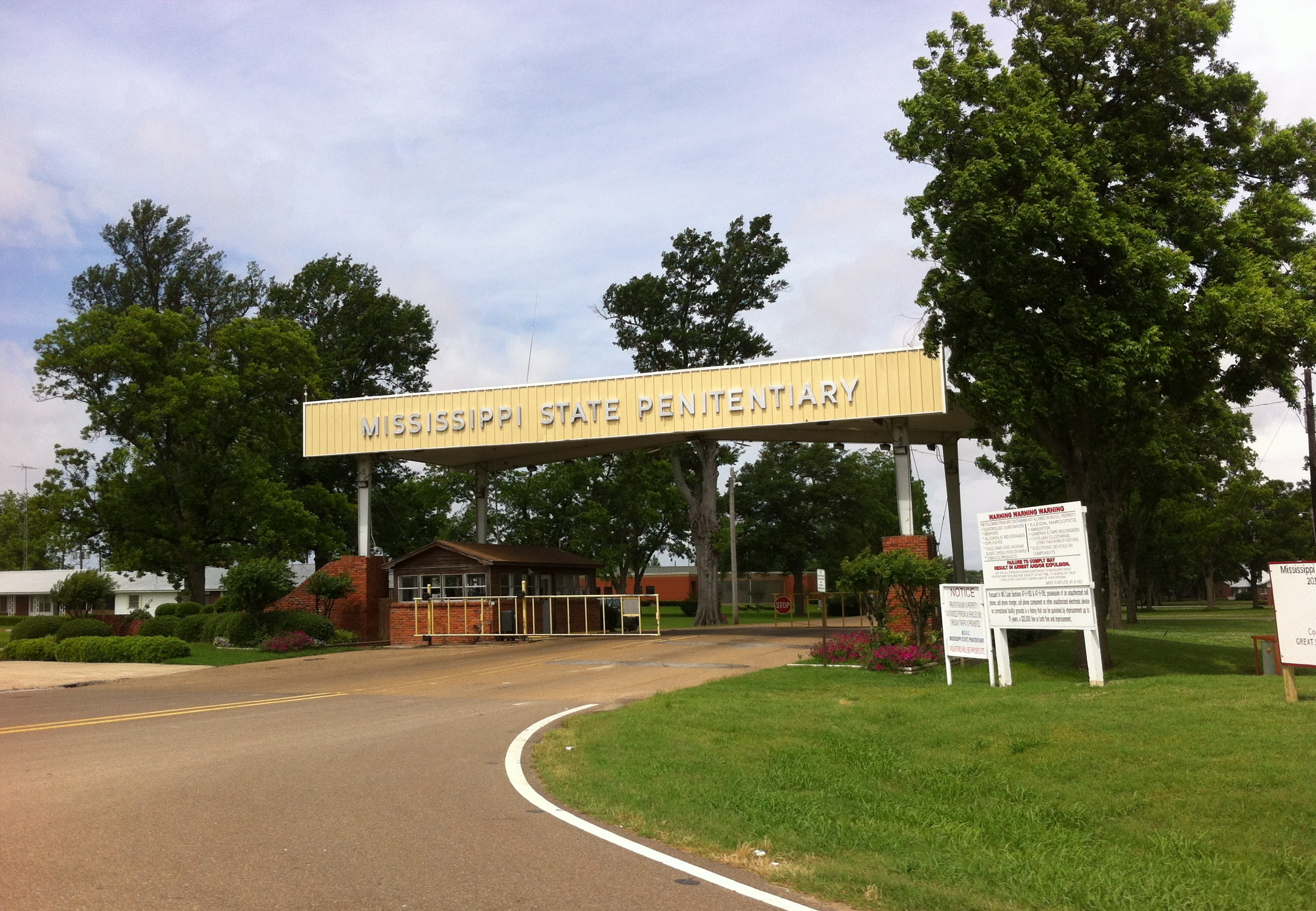
The Mississippi State Penitentiary, which houses male death row prisoners sentenced by the State of Mississippi

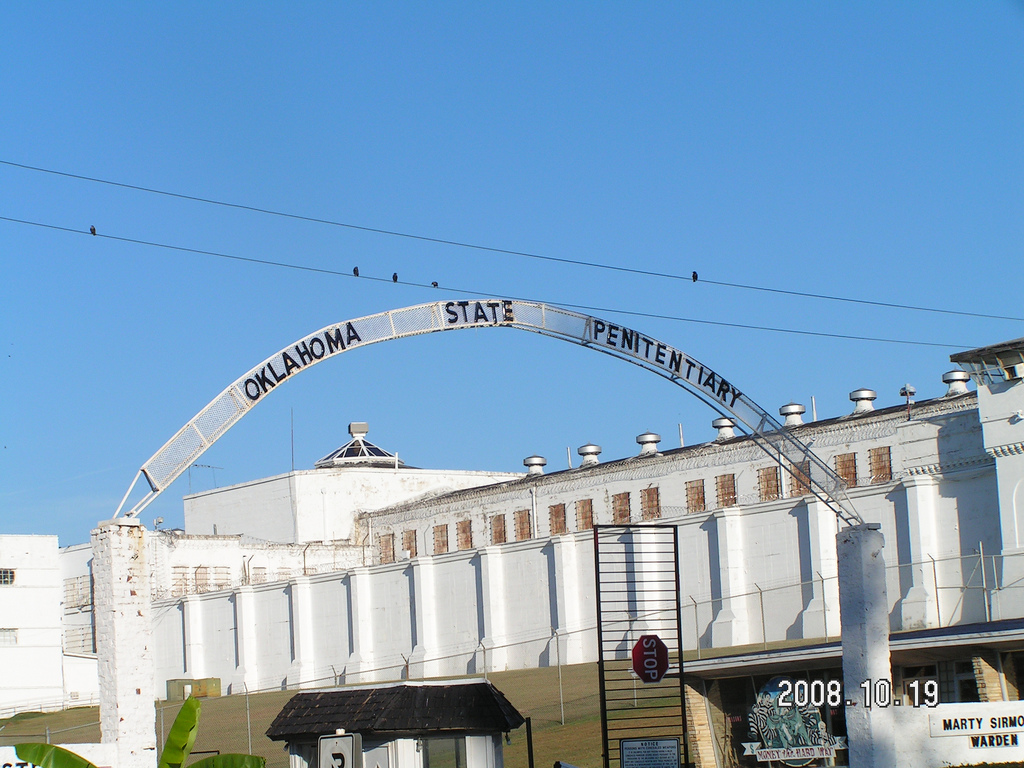
Oklahoma State Penitentiary, which houses male death row prisoners sentenced by the state of Oklahoma

In the United States, prisoners may wait many years before execution can be carried out due to the complex and time-consuming appeals procedures mandated in the jurisdiction. The time between sentencing and execution increased relatively steadily between 1977 and 2010, including a 21% jump between 1989 and 1990 and a similar jump between 2008 and 2009. In 2010, a death row inmate waited an average of 178 months (14 years and 10 months) between sentencing and execution. Nearly a quarter of inmates on death row in the U.S. die of natural causes while awaiting execution.

There were 2,721 people on death row in the United States on October 1, 2018. As of 2024, 2,183 people are on death row in the United States. Since 1977, the states of Texas (464), Virginia (108) and Oklahoma (94) have executed the most death row inmates. As of 2010, California (683), Florida (390), Texas (330) and Pennsylvania (218) housed more than half of all inmates pending on death row. Gary Alvord arrived on Florida's death row in 1974 and died 39 years later on May 19, 2013, from a brain tumor, having spent more time on death row than any American. Brandon Astor Jones spent 36 years on death row (with a brief period in the general prison population during his re-sentencing trial) before being executed for felony murder by the state of Georgia in 2016, at the age of 72. The oldest prisoner on death row in the United States was Leroy Nash, age 94, in Arizona. He died of natural causes on February 12, 2010.

=== Death row locations ===
Federal	Men's death row	Women's death row
Civilian	Majority: United States Penitentiary, Terre Haute, Indiana ADX Florence, Fremont County, Colorado (Timothy McVeigh, Joseph Edward Duncan, Kaboni Savage, Dzhokhar Tsarnaev) MCFP Springfield, Missouri (Marvin Charles Gabrion)	Federal Medical Center, Carswell, Fort Worth, Texas
Military	United States Disciplinary Barracks, Fort Leavenworth, Kansas	Naval Consolidated Brig, Miramar, San Diego, California (Note: Naval Consolidated Brig, Miramar is the only facility in the United States Department of Defense designated to house female Level III inmates.)

State	Men's death row	Women's death row
Alabama	Holman Correctional Facility, Atmore and William E. Donaldson Correctional Facility, Jefferson County	Julia Tutwiler Prison for Women, Wetumpka
Arizona	Arizona State Prison Complex – Tucson (Rincon Unit), Tucson; Arizona State Prison Complex – Eyman, Florence	Arizona State Prison Complex – Perryville (Lumley Unit), Goodyear
Arkansas	Varner Unit, Lincoln County	McPherson Unit, Newport
California	San Quentin State Prison, Marin County (formerly), now housed in general population at institutions throughout the state	Central California Women's Facility, Chowchilla, now housed in general population
Florida	Union Correctional Institution, Union County and Florida State Prison, Bradford County	Lowell Correctional Institution Annex, Marion County
Georgia	Georgia Diagnostic and Classification Prison, Butts County	Arrendale State Prison, Habersham County
Idaho	Idaho Maximum Security Institution, Ada County	Pocatello Women's Correctional Center, Pocatello
Indiana	Indiana State Prison, Michigan City	Indiana Women's Prison, Indianapolis
Kansas	El Dorado Correctional Facility, El Dorado	Topeka Correctional Facility, Topeka
Kentucky	Kentucky State Penitentiary, Eddyville	Kentucky Correctional Institute for Women, Shelby County
Louisiana	Louisiana State Penitentiary, West Feliciana Parish	Louisiana Correctional Institute for Women, St. Gabriel
Mississippi	Mississippi State Penitentiary, Sunflower County	Central Mississippi Correctional Facility, Rankin County
Missouri	Potosi Correctional Center, Washington County	Women's Eastern Reception, Diagnostic and Correctional Center, Vandalia
Montana	Montana State Prison, Powell County	Montana Women's Prison, Billings
Nebraska	Tecumseh State Correctional Institution, Johnson County	Nebraska Correctional Center for Women, York County
Nevada	High Desert State Prison, Clark County	Florence McClure Women's Correctional Center, North Las Vegas
New Hampshire	New Hampshire State Prison for Men, Concord	New Hampshire State Prison for Women, Concord
New Mexico	Penitentiary of New Mexico, Santa Fe County	Northwest New Mexico Correctional Facility, Grants
North Carolina	Central Prison, Raleigh	North Carolina Correctional Institution for Women, Raleigh
Ohio	Ross Correctional Institution, Ross County; Ohio State Penitentiary, Youngstown; and Franklin Medical Center, Columbus	Ohio Reformatory for Women, Marysville
Oklahoma	Oklahoma State Penitentiary, McAlester	Mabel Bassett Correctional Center, McLoud
Oregon	Oregon State Penitentiary, Salem	Coffee Creek Correctional Facility, Wilsonville
Pennsylvania	SCI-Somerset, Somerset Township and SCI-Phoenix, Skippack Township	SCI-Muncy, Clinton Township
South Carolina	Broad River Correctional Institution, Columbia	Camille Griffin Graham Correctional Institution, Columbia
South Dakota	South Dakota State Penitentiary, Sioux Falls	South Dakota Women's Prison, Pierre
Tennessee	Riverbend Maximum Security Institution, Nashville	Tennessee Prison for Women, Nashville
Texas	Polunsky Unit, West Livingston and Wayne Scott Unit (formerly Jester IV Unit), Fort Bend County	Patrick O'Daniel Unit (formerly Mountain View Unit), Gatesville
Utah	Utah State Correctional Facility, Salt Lake City	Central Utah Correctional Facility, Gunnison
Wyoming	Wyoming State Penitentiary, Rawlins	Wyoming Women's Center, Lusk

== Criticism of death row ==
Nearly all European countries have abolished capital punishment. Currently, Belarus remains the only European country to use the death penalty.

Around 70% of the world's countries have abolished capital punishment. These countries are frequently concerned with their citizens in the United States criminal system. There have even been instances of other countries citing human rights laws against the United States, or refusing to extradite incriminating material, in fear of their citizens being put on death row.

On November 9, 2020, the United States received persistent criticism on its use of capital punishment during a United Nations review of its human rights record. Many allies of the United States urged that the U.S. cease executions. France urged the US halt executions, Germany suggested a federal moratorium on and eventual abolition, Austria called for immediate cessation of executions and then abolition, and Australia, the Netherlands, and Switzerland all called for abolition entirely.

== Other countries ==
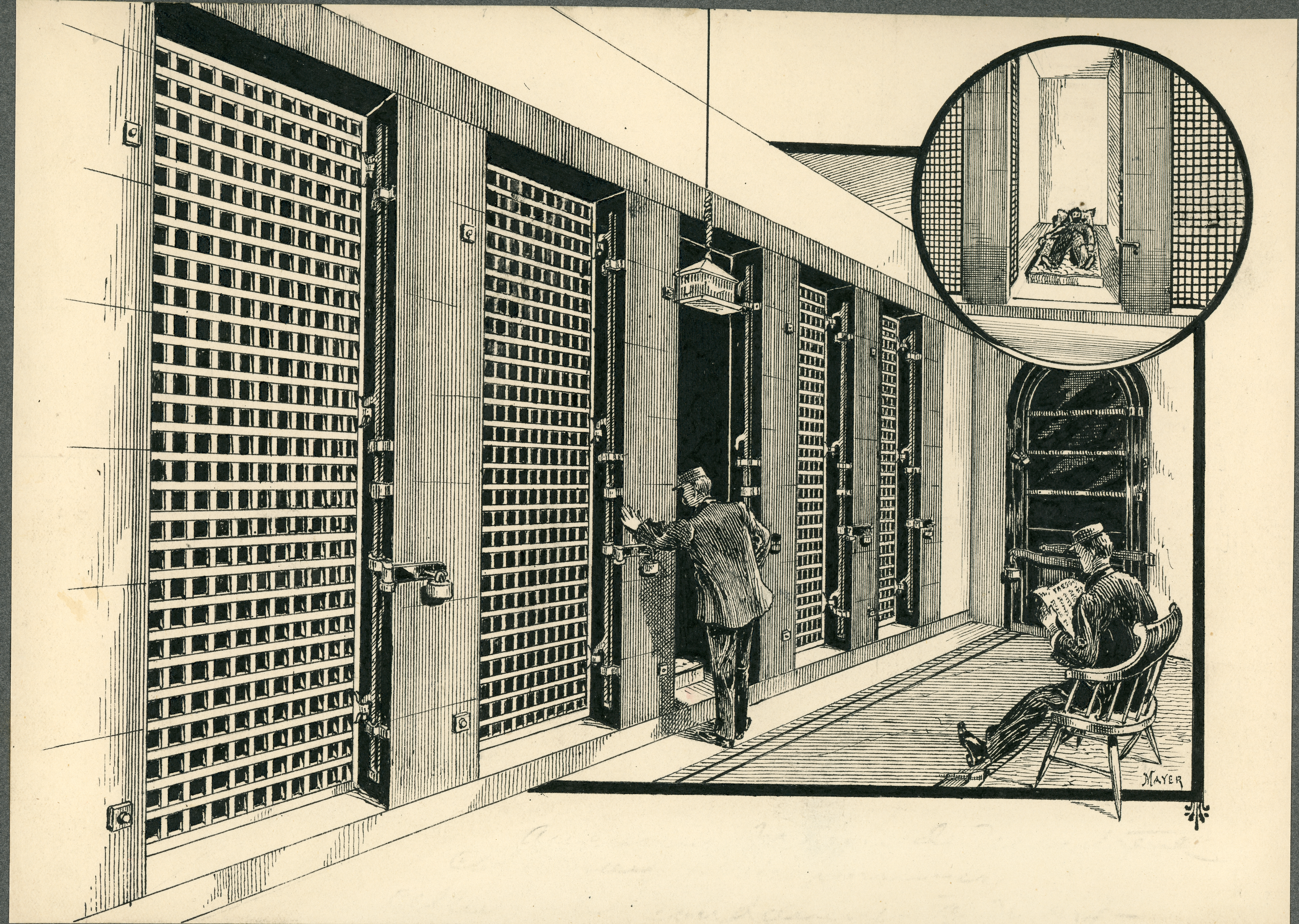
Death row at Pied-du-Courant Prison in Montreal

According to Amnesty International, Saudi Arabia, Iraq, and Iran were responsible for most known executions worldwide in 2020. (Note: The organization notes their report does not include the thousands of executions it believes occur in China, where capital punishment data is classified as a state secret.) When the United Kingdom practised capital punishment, there were generally no 'death rows'. The condemned were however separated from the general prison population in one of two 'condemned cells' located adjacent to the execution chamber. Sentenced inmates were given one appeal. If that appeal was found to involve an important point of law it was taken up to the House of Lords (which previously functioned as the British court of final appeal), and if the appeal was successful, at that point the sentence was changed to life imprisonment. The Home Secretary had the power to exercise the Sovereign's royal prerogative of mercy to grant a reprieve on execution and change the sentence to life imprisonment. Essentially the speedy process from conviction to execution, re-sentencing or reprieve meant that there were low numbers, (if any) prisoners under sentence of death at any one time and so there was no need for a 'death row'. Assistant executioner Syd Dernley used the term "death row" in his 1990 memoir The Hangman's Tale to refer to the situation at Wandsworth Prison in April 1951 where, as only up to two persons could be hanged at one time, the execution of murderer James Virrels had to await the prior double execution of murderers/robbers Joseph Brown and Edward Smith a day earlier, before going ahead on April 26.

In some Caribbean countries that still authorize execution, the Judicial Committee of the Privy Council is the ultimate court of appeals. It has upheld appeals by prisoners who have spent several years under sentence of death, stating that it does not desire to see the death row phenomenon emerge in countries under its jurisdiction.

=== Condemned cells ===
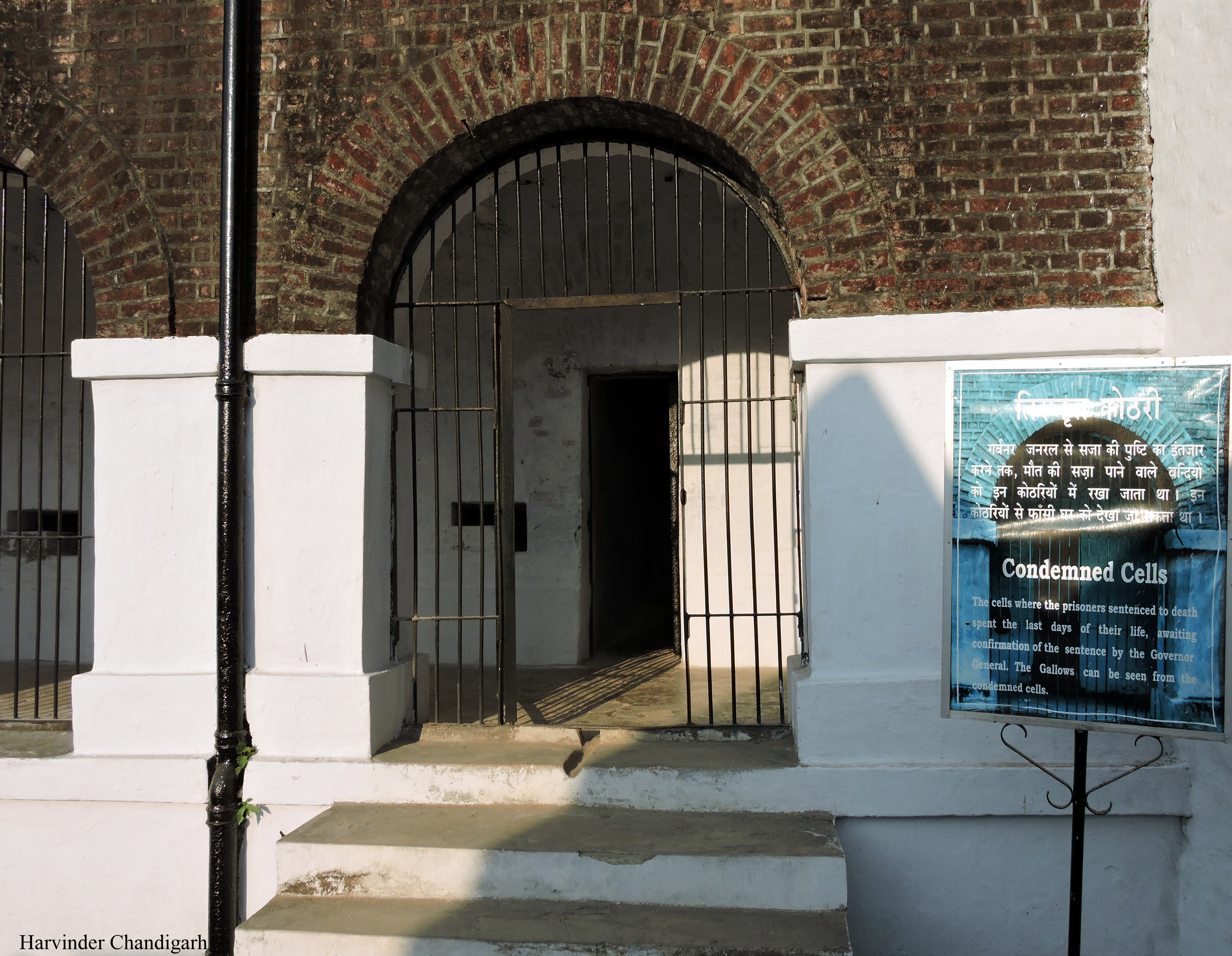
A special condemned cell at Cellular Jail, Port Blair, India

A condemned cell, also known as a death row cell, is a designated room within a prison where individuals who have been sentenced to death as a legal punishment are held until their execution. This specialized cell is a temporary holding area specifically designed for individuals awaiting capital punishment.

Condemned cells are constructed with a focus on security and isolation. The room is typically designed to limit access and maintain strict control over the condemned individual. Furnishings and amenities in these cells are often minimal, as they are not intended for long-term incarceration but rather for the purpose of facilitating the impending execution. Typically, a condemned cell can house between one and three inmates.

==== Bangladesh ====
Bangladesh has witnessed significant controversy surrounding the use of condemned cells in relation to capital punishment. The issue has sparked debates on various aspects, including human rights, the efficiency of the death penalty, and the treatment of individuals awaiting execution. Several Bangladeshi prisons house inmates on trial in condemned cells, which is met with severe criticism. There have been instances where acquitted people have been confined in condemned cells, for multiple years.

== See also ==
- Outline of capital punishment
- Live from Death Row
- The Green Mile
- The Chamber
- Dead Man Walking
- Fourteen Days in May
- Somebody Has to Shoot the Picture
- List of death row inmates in the United States
- List of death row inmates in Japan
- List of women on death row in the United States
- List of exonerated death row inmates
- Execution chamber
- List of wrongful convictions in the United States
