= Matthew Muller =

American serial rapist, kidnapper, and lawyer

- Born: Matthew Daniel Muller; March 27, 1977 (age 49); California, U.S.
- Education: Pomona College (BS); Harvard Law School (JD)
- Known for: 'Gone Girl' kidnapping
- Status: Pleaded guilty and no-contest
- Criminal charges: Kidnapping, burglary, forcible rape, battery, assault, false imprisonment
- Penalty: 31 years and 40 years, served concurrently; 4 life sentences

Details
- Date apprehended: June 9, 2015
- Imprisoned at: Federal Correctional Institution, Tucson

Matthew Daniel Muller (born March 27, 1977) is an American serial rapist and kidnapper, former immigration attorney, and Marine veteran.

Muller is a serial sex offender who has committed at least six violent crimes. From at least 2009 until his apprehension in 2015 he invaded homes, held his victims for ransom, kidnapped his victims, and raped or attempted to rape the female victims. In 2015 he kidnapped Denise Huskins while she was with her boyfriend Aaron Quinn, whose account police originally treated as a hoax. The Huskins case was referred to in the media as the "Gone Girl" kidnapping, and was depicted in the Netflix docuseries American Nightmare. In 2024, he confessed to perpetrating several cold cases beginning as early as 1993.

Muller is a decorated United States Marine Corps veteran. He was honorably discharged after developing mental health issues in the Middle East. He was a Harvard-educated immigration lawyer who gained prominence after he halted a deportation by using an online petition. He was voted one of the American Bar Association's "Techiest Lawyers." He was disbarred in 2015 after a decline in his mental health; he was diagnosed with bipolar disorder with psychotic features and schizophrenia.

Muller developed a delusion that he should kidnap "evil wealthy people" for ransom to give to the poor. He was caught on June 9, 2015, after leaving his cell phone and other evidence at the site of the unsuccessful third home invasion. He is being held in Federal Correctional Institution, Tucson, where he is serving four life sentences.

== Early life ==
Muller grew up in the suburbs of Sacramento. His mother Joyce was a middle school English teacher, and his father, Monty, was a school administrator who served as a wrestling coach. He has one younger brother, Kent. His parents divorced during his senior year of high school after his father began an extramarital affair. Muller was introverted and bullied for being overweight growing up. He was also known as someone who "fought for the underdog".

He played the trumpet in his Fair Oaks, California, high school band, participated in computer club, and earned over a 3.8 GPA taking high achiever coursework. Muller is fluent in English, Spanish, Russian and German.

In 1993, when Muller was 16, he kidnapped and raped his first victim, a teenager who was tent camping with her boyfriend at Folsom Lake State Recreation Area. Muller held the teens at gunpoint, tied the male victim up, then abducted the female victim from the campsite to sexually assault her. He confessed to this cold case crime in 2024 in a signed affidavit.

Muller graduated from Bella Vista High School in 1995.

== Military service and education ==
Service ribbon

Sea Service Deployment Ribbon

Service medals
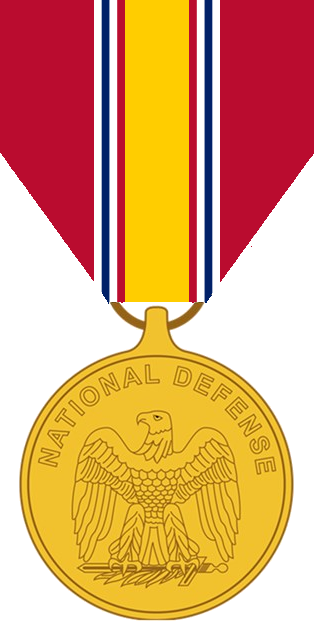
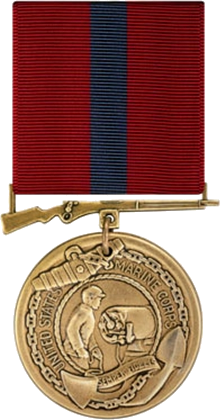
(from left) National Defense Service Medal, Marine Corps Good Conduct Medal, Navy and Marine Corps Achievement Medal

In 1995, he enlisted in the United States Marine Corps to get in shape and to earn money to attend college. He played trumpet in the United States Marine Band across the world, including Australia, Abu Dhabi, and the United Arab Emirates. While stationed in Okinawa, Japan, Muller started a nonprofit organization to teach locals about the internet and worked at an off-base bilingual newspaper. He also served in the 3rd Marine Aircraft Wing at Marine Corps Air Station El Toro and took part in Operation Pacific Haven.

In 1999, he was deployed to train soldiers in the Middle East where he became a decorated marine. He earned three service medals, one ribbon, and was promoted to a sergeant. Muller developed severe mental health issues he referred to as Gulf War syndrome, despite never having been in combat. He requested a discharge, which was granted, honorably. While serving, Muller said he witnessed discrimination and harassment against fellow marines who were suspected of not being heterosexual. He served for four years.

Muller attended a community college and transferred to Pomona College. In 2001, he participated in an academic summer abroad in Prague. He graduated with summa cum laude honors as a double major in economics and science, technology, and society within the Public Policy Analysis program. His undergraduate senior thesis in the program was titled Once Again Waiting: Implementation of the Nicaraguan Adjustment and Central American Relief Act. While at Pomona, he volunteered helping homeless people obtain government services, organized Orientation Adventure trips, and contributed to political campaign finance research.

After graduating in 2003, he moved to Boston and enrolled in Harvard Law School. While in law school, he volunteered at Harvard's Legal Aid Bureau, where he began to work with immigrants and low-income rental tenants who had been victims of domestic violence. In October of his first year, he spoke at a teach-in about the implications of the Solomon Amendment and advocated for Harvard to change its policies around military recruitment in accordance with its anti-discrimination policies. He obtained a juris doctor in 2006.

== Law career ==
Muller remained at Harvard as a fellow and research assistant in the law school's Immigration and Refugee Clinical Program, working under Deborah Anker. He contributed to a chapter in a law book authored by Anker. When the director went on sabbatical, he stepped in to manage the program. In his role at Harvard, he earned near-perfect marks. Muller was known as an incredibly caring and intelligent student, professor, and legal advocate, but was also described as being "unusually devoted" to his clients.

In 2009, Muller relocated to Silicon Valley. He passed the bar exam and worked at an immigration law firm, but did not register with the California bar. In 2011, Muller started volunteering with a legal non-profit. He then registered with the state bar and began practicing law at the San Francisco office of Reeves and Associates. He quit within six months after working excessive overtime and getting caught sleeping at the office. In 2012, Muller found work at Kerosky, Purves and Bogue, another immigration law firm. He was fired the same year for undisclosed reasons. In 2012, he founded a non-profit called Immigrant Ability, which provided pro bono services for immigrants with mental illness.

=== Successful Change.org immigration petition ===
In June 2012, Muller took on a pro bono client named Blanca Medina, a mother with post-traumatic stress disorder who fled El Salvador to escape sexual abuse. Medina was imminently scheduled to be deported after missing an immigration hearing in 2006. Immigration agents referred to Medina as a fugitive, and she was arrested by the Immigration and Customs Enforcement (ICE) Fugitive Operation team in 2011 and held as a flight risk in West County Detention Facility in Richmond, California.

Muller filed paperwork to reopen her asylum case, citing the multiple rapes she faced in her home country, including one by an influential gang member during her border crossing, and mental health reasons for missing court. It was denied by immigration courts because the request was not timely. Muller started a Change.org petition stating that, "Under ICE rules, it is free to ignore even conclusive proof that a person would suffer slow death by torture if deported." The petition was widely covered by media and the case became a cause célèbre.

After earning nearly 118,000 signatures, Muller delivered the petition to the ICE San Francisco field office. The case was successfully reopened for hearing and Medina's deportation proceedings were halted. The popularity of the case drew attention to the use of online petitions and the influence of public opinion in immigration cases. Muller argued that even missing an immigration hearing for "no good reason" should not result in deportation if there is a risk of persecution or torture. The case earned him a nomination as one of the American Bar Association's "Techiest Lawyers" in 2012.

=== Disbarment ===
Muller's law license was suspended in 2013 for non-payment of dues. He was disbarred in the state of California in 2015 over disciplinary action from failing to show up for court several times and failing to file green card paperwork on behalf of a paying client. He was disbarred from federal practice in the Immigration Courts in 2017 after pleading guilty to charges of kidnapping for ransom.

== Mental health decline and crimes ==
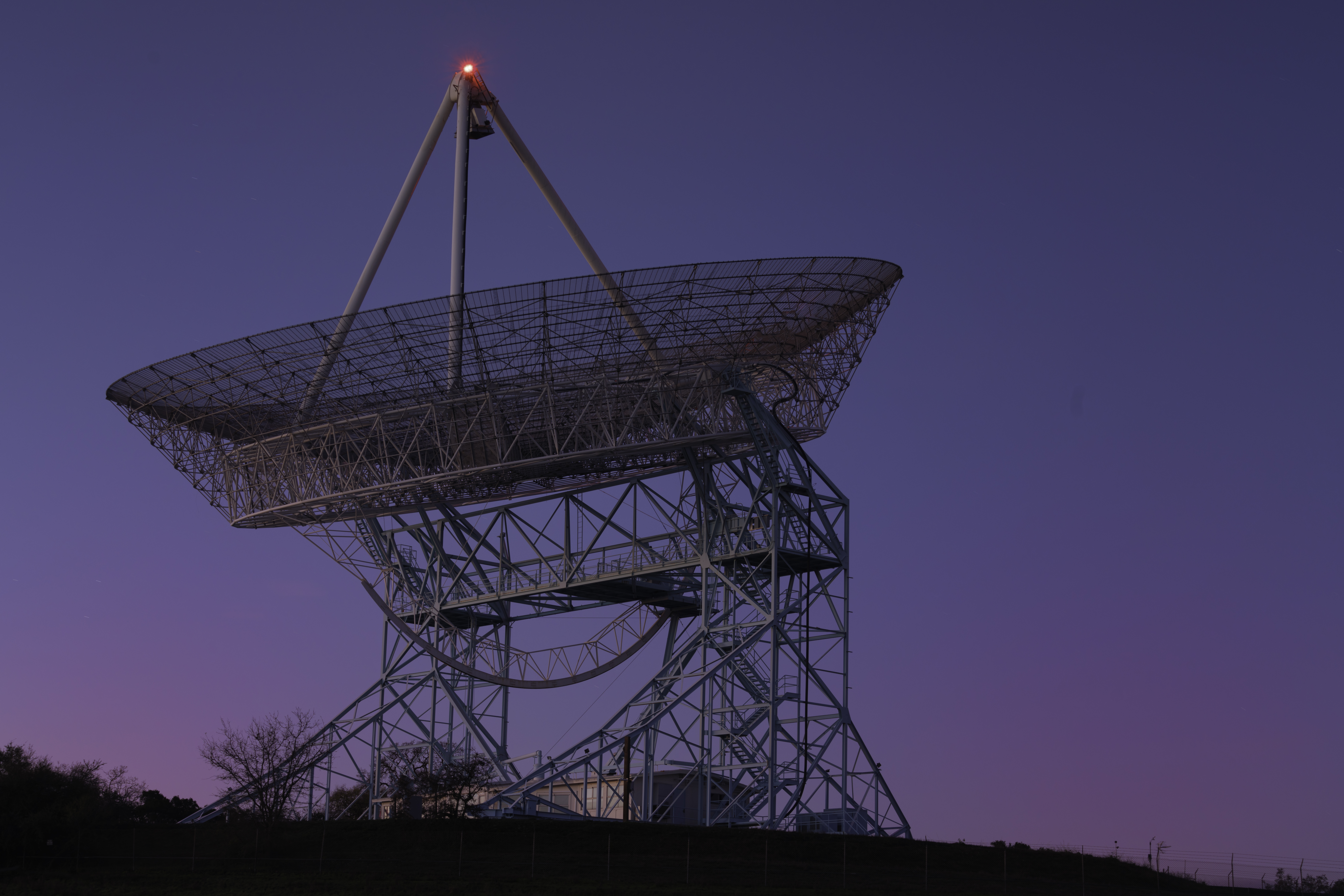
The Stanford Dish

During his time at Harvard, Muller was diagnosed with major depression with signs of mania after contemplating suicide. After his symptoms continued to worsen, he was diagnosed with bipolar disorder in 2008. He developed paranoid delusions that the government had wiretapped his phone and hacked his computer due to suspected ties of some of his immigration clients to terrorists.

=== 2009 Santa Clara County home invasions ===
On September 29, 2009, Muller dressed in a black spandex-like suit and a ski mask and broke into a 27-year-old woman's home in Mountain View, California. He tied her up, covered her eyes with blacked-out swim goggles, forced her to drink NyQuil and informed her he was stealing her identity to steal her money. During the invasion, the victim said Muller spoke to himself as though he had accomplices. He informed the victim that he worked with an organized crime syndicate. He "politely" informed her he was going to rape her. After she begged him not to, he apologized, told her to get a dog, and left without sexually assaulting her.

The Friday before the invasion, Muller had been stopped by police in a residential neighborhood in College Terrace, Palo Alto, California, near the Stanford Dish around midnight. A resident reported a "suspicious" man prowling apartment buildings. Muller fabricated a story that he was a visiting professor at Stanford University and seeing a friend. He later told Atavist Magazine in 2022 that he went walking at night on the trail near the dish and didn't want to tell the officer willingly he'd been trespassing. Although Muller initially denied involvement in a legal filing, he confessed to the crime in 2024..

A few weeks later, on October 18, 2009, Muller broke into the apartment of a 32-year old Stanford student in College Terrace. Like the Mountain View home invasion, he was dressed in black spandex-like suit and a ski mask, tied her up, covered her eyes, and drugged her with NyQuil. He also gathered her personal information and informed her he was going to use it to take her money. The victim said she heard him whispering as if speaking to someone, but she didn't actually hear or see anyone else. Muller attempted to rape her, but she fought back. After making up a story about a prior rape, Muller left, telling her if she called 911 he would harm her family and claimed he planted fake evidence to mislead authorities. Muller also gave her crime prevention advice before leaving.

When the police determined that Muller had lied to the police and the victim had attended a policy panel organized by Muller at Harvard in 2008, he became their prime suspect in the College Terrace incident. At the time, he was ruled out via DNA profiling and police did not have any evidence to point to Muller. He also denied involvement in a 2015 legal filing but in 2024, he confessed to the crime.

He was later suspected of being involved in other incidents, including a similar home invasion and attempted rape near the Stanford campus on November 29, 2012. The victim, a 26-year-old woman, also fought back. The perpetrator had taken her laptop and left behind two bump keys. DNA on the bump keys did not match Muller's. During a traffic stop a few weeks later, police officers found burglary tools in Muller's vehicle.

In November, when Muller was questioned at work about the College Terrace home invasion, he became paranoid that the Palo Alto Police Department was conspiring with the Chinese government and had wire-tapped his law office and his vehicle. He did not appear for a scheduled interview with police, and dropped out of contact with his wife. Muller left a note on USB flash drive, stating: "I'm going completely off the grid, no phone, email, credit cards, etc., so please do not try to track me as it will only draw attention," and "I have problems beyond my mental health." Muller traded vehicles with his mother and fled to Hurricane, Utah, near Zion National Park to avoid the "psychological warfare" he believed was being waged against him by the Chinese government. His camp was set up with motion detectors and trip wires. After only two days, he began to fear his environment and returned home to stay with his mother and later, with his father.

=== Batman and Robin Hood delusions ===
In 2011, Muller resumed psychiatric care, but after he was caught by Security sleeping at his law office, his delusions resumed. He copied thousands of company files to find evidence of his bosses tracking him. The law firm sued him, initially believing he was stealing the data for use to start his own practice, but later dropped the suit. His mother rented an apartment for him in Sacramento, from which he was later evicted.

In 2014, he moved to Mare Island with a girlfriend and got a job at an after-school academic program. She expressed concern about Muller after learning he took long walks around the peninsula dressed entirely in black. They eventually ended their relationship. He filed for bankruptcy the same year with $500,000 in liabilities, but the case was dismissed after he neglected to file timely paperwork.

While living on Mare Island, Muller developed a delusion that a secret cabal of the world's wealthiest people were a "scienced-up version of demons" responsible for all of the evil in the world. Muller suspected members of this cabal included his neighbor Aaron Quinn and Quinn's ex-girlfriend Andrea Roberts. Muller stole an out-of-town neighbor's white Ford Mustang, which he said he drove recklessly and maybe, "saved a neighborhood kid or dog."

Muller was suspected of being the "Mare Island Creeper", a Peeping Tom seen with a ladder scaling homes and crouching in yards. A student said she had seen the same man walking a husky puppy and a golden retriever, a pair of dogs belonging to Muller's neighbor which he occasionally dog-sat. In a manifesto sent to Henry Lee at the San Francisco Chronicle, Muller said that he had scared the neighborhood Peeping Tom off a roof and anonymously reported it to the police.

In early 2015, he moved into a cabin in South Lake Tahoe, California, belonging to his mother and her husband. He became increasingly reclusive, rarely sleeping and obsessively watched the Batman film series. By spring, Muller began to believe his parents were spying on him. He entered a severe psychotic episode and created a nocturnal vigilante identity to fight evil. He wore a wetsuit and created tools resembling weapons from items like flashlights, laser pointers, dog collars, swim goggles, spray paint, and various toy guns, such as a Nerf Super Soaker. Muller created a Robin Hood plot to kidnap "evil wealthy people" for ransom to give to the poor, which he believed in his psychosis to be "morally justified."

=== 'Gone Girl' kidnapping ===
On March 23, 2015, around 3:00am, Muller broke into Aaron Quinn's house with a water pistol disguised as a firearm. Quinn was living with his girlfriend Denise Huskins; Muller drugged them both and demanded Huskins bind Quinn with zip ties. During the encounter, Muller whispered as if speaking to others, and appeared to be speaking aloud to one or more accomplices. He demanded two ransom payments of $8,500 (Note: Reports varied between the ransom amount being $8,500, $15,000, and $17,000. Muller said he chose $8,500 to avoid banks flagging the transaction. Court documents stated the demand was for two separate payments.) each that was never paid.

Muller had developed a delusion that he was part of an elite three-person gang that began as an auto-theft ring likened to an "Ocean's Eleven gentleman criminals who only took stuff that was insured from people who could afford it." Muller later said he acted alone, referring to the professional gang as part of his psychosis. Authorities also determined that Muller acted alone. Huskins wrote in her memoir, Victim F, (Note: Huskins is referred to as "Victim F" in court documents.) that she and Quinn still believed Muller had accomplices at the time of the kidnapping, and were being lied to by the authorities.

Muller informed Quinn and Huskins over the course of the event that Muller's ex-girlfriend Andrea Roberts had actually been his intended kidnapping target. Muller played a recording that indicated the break-in was being completed by professionals to collect debts. The message threatened the victims with electric shock and demanded Quinn's financial information and passwords. Muller stole Quinn's car, his laptop computer, and led him to believe that he was being monitored by video camera. Thus, Quinn hesitated contacting authorities. Muller put Huskins in the trunk of Quinn's car, moved her to the stolen Mustang, and held her captive at the cabin in South Lake Tahoe. He raped Huskins twice.

Quinn eventually called his brother, an FBI agent, who told Quinn to call 911. He reported the kidnapping at around 2:00pm on March 23, 2015. The Vallejo police did not believe that the invasion happened, or that Huskins had been abducted, instead interrogating Quinn as a murder suspect.

While holding Huskins hostage, Muller sent several anonymous emails to the San Francisco Chronicle. The emails demanded ransom for Huskins and claimed the kidnapping was a training mission for higher net worth targets. He recorded a "proof of life" of Huskins and said she would be returned "in good health." The Vallejo police refused to confirm that the voice was Huskins.

On March 25, 2015, Muller drove Huskins some 400 miles from South Lake Tahoe to Huntington Beach, California. She was dropped off around 10:00am near her family's home. She and her father went to the Huntington Beach police. At 9:30pm that same day, Vallejo police officials told the public that the incident had been a hoax perpetrated by Huskins. Police and media referred to the case as a "real life 'Gone Girl'," referring to the film Gone Girl, an adaptation of the Gillian Flynn novel by the same name.

In 2018, it was reported that the Vallejo police department had been in possession of evidence that would have led them to Muller. Muller had been filmed by security cameras while buying a TracFone at a Target in Pleasant Hill, California, and the phone was later used to call Quinn while Huskins was being held. The experience of Quinn and Huskins was detailed in the Netflix docuseries American Nightmare. They filed a defamation lawsuit against the police department and were awarded $2.5 million.

On March 26, 2015, Muller sent a 9,000-word email to the San Francisco Chronicle that the intended target was not Huskins, but Andrea Roberts, and demanded the record be set straight maintaining he had kidnapped Huskins and that the couple was telling the truth. He also wrote that the operation went "terribly wrong," that he felt deep remorse and regret, and "in particular," that he was mortified of the impact he had on Huskins. Muller also admitted to several property crimes in the missive, comparing the events to the film A Clockwork Orange "without the ultra-violence."

The Vallejo police refused to corroborate the existence of crimes Muller described in the email. In further emails, Muller wrote that he was outraged at the police and demanded an apology on behalf of his victims. He also contacted Kenny Park of the Vallejo police to prove the victims' innocence. Muller also threatened that if the department and Park did not apologize "by noon Tuesday" (March 30, 2015) that Muller may harm someone else.

After Nancy Grace declared on her show, "Everything about this 'kidnap' screams out hoax," Muller planned another kidnapping and intending to send photographs to Grace. Muller planned to write a note claiming this additional kidnapping was Grace's fault and threatened to "do it again" until claims about Huskins "being the Gone Girl" were retracted.

Two weeks after he kidnapped Huskins, Muller committed another home invasion and kidnapping for ransom, in San Ramon, California. In this case, he extorted tens of thousands of dollars from the victims. This crime was not reported until 2024.

=== Dublin home invasion ===
Muller targeted a street in Dublin, California, for its "easy escape" and targeted a family he said he believed in his delusion to be a part of the same "one percent" cabal to justify the crime. He said his motive was to vindicate Huskins.

On June 5, 2015, at 3:30 AM, Muller entered the targeted home and demanded the couple lie face down on the bed. He informed them he had their daughter, and that she was safe, and informed them he would tie their hands behind their backs. The male victim fought back and tackled Muller to the floor and called for his wife to retrieve their gun. Muller hit him in the head and fled. The victim had to have the resulting wound on his head stapled shut. The female victim grabbed her cell phone and locked herself in the bathroom to call for help. The couple's 22-year-old daughter was not taken. Muller left his cell phone behind, which was traced to the South Lake Tahoe cabin.

=== Arrest, trial, and incarceration ===
On June 8, 2015, Muller demanded his mother pick him up from a Starbucks and took his brother's car without explanation. He was arrested without incident at the South Lake Tahoe cabin on June 9, 2015 by the Alameda County Sheriff's Office in connection with the Dublin home invasion.

Misty Carausu, who was in the process of becoming a detective, processed the cabin and a stolen white Ford Mustang nearby. Carausu found Muller's property, evidence matching the Dublin and Vallejo crimes, a hair from Huskins attached to a pair of swim goggles, and Quinn's laptop. The Mustang had a GPS system, which still held the address Muller drove Huskins to in Huntington Beach. Carausu connected Muller to the Vallejo case, and also forwarded information to the FBI. Muller was held in Santa Rita Jail after being charged with battery, robbery, and assault.

On June 29, 2015, the FBI obtained a search warrant for Muller's arrest for the Vallejo kidnapping. On July 1, 2015, they seized drones, a wireless camera system, bed sheets, and a stained mattress pad from a storage unit in Muller's name. The FBI announced charges of kidnapping on July 13, 2015.

On September 16, 2015, Muller's attorney withdrew a motion to suppress the cell phone as evidence. The motion alleged that authorities violated Muller's constitutional rights by carrying out an illegal search when they bypassed the lock screen by dialing 911 to retrieve the phone number from emergency dispatchers. Chris Shepard, the sergeant in the case, testified the situation did not require a search warrant. On September 18, 2015, Muller pled no-contest to all charges in the Dublin case. He fainted in the court room. He had confessed to some of the crimes while speaking "off the record" to a reporter while in jail.

Muller was arraigned on September 21, 2015, and indicted for kidnapping by a federal grand jury on October 1, 2015, for the Vallejo case. On September 29, 2016, Muller pleaded guilty to kidnapping. He was sentenced to 40 years on March 16, 2017. He was remanded to a high-security federal prison in Tucson, Arizona.

In January 2018, the state filed charges against Muller in Solano County, California, for two counts of rape, false imprisonment, kidnapping, burglary, and robbery of a residential dwelling. He was transferred to a Solano County jail. Muller represented himself pro se and proclaimed he was "not guilty" and said he was "not mentally sound" when he pleaded guilty to the federal charges. He told reporters he would plead guilty if Huskins and Quinn donated half of their settlement to charity. He filed motion to have his conviction vacated due to failings by his attorney, prosecutorial misconduct, and constitutional violations. The motion was denied. Muller said he had been physically and sexually abused in prison. He said he experienced symptoms of PTSD from being beaten and raped in prison. He requested counsel and was appointed a public defender on September 24, 2018.

In October 2018, Muller described a delusion in which he became convinced the prison officials were experimenting with his medication. He said he planned a temporary insanity defense, though experts said he had low odds of winning, based on the fact that insanity pleas require mental illness so severe the defendant becomes unable to distinguish right from wrong.

In 2019, Muller fired his public defender. He was found competent to represent himself by a Solano County judge. Acting as his own attorney gave him the opportunity to cross-examine his victims, which their attorney protested, citing Proposition 115. Muller declined to do so, stating he did not want to re-victimize them. He filed 35-page speedy trial request citing his mental condition and assaults while in custody and discovery was scheduled for late April.

After receiving legal discovery, Muller fell into a new delusion that the Dublin police had conspired to frame him. Muller alleged that four days before his arrest, Dublin police broke into his cabin to plant evidence, planted additional evidence during his arrest, altered police reports, made "Hollywood-grade edits" to evidence photos, and forged forensic records and judicial records. Due to details he could not remember Muller wrote, "The government’s case included evidence and allegations the Movant did not understand and could not remember. The Movant had believed this was a matter of mental illness…. However, it was federal authorities and not the Movant’s mind that had altered reality."

In November 2020, Muller was diagnosed with schizophrenia after he pronounced his belief that his family had been replaced with imposters, that he was surrounded by "a bunch of actors... agents... even sort of demon-possessed people," and had a device implanted in his body against his will. The judge, whom Muller referred to as Lucifer, ruled that he was incompetent to stand trial. He was moved to Napa State Hospital in 2021. In September, a judge ordered him to be medicated against his will. In March 2022, after Muller was deemed competent, his attorney confirmed he was pleading no-contest to all state charges. He was sentenced to 31 years on state charges to be served concurrently.

He is being held in Federal Correctional Institution, Tucson.

== Cold case confessions ==
In 2024, Muller confessed to several prior crimes in signed affidavits filed with the Seaside, California, police chief. The police chief worked with previous victims Huskins and Quinn after their appearance in American Nightmare as crime victim advocates. The police chief, Huskins, Quinn, El Dorado County, California district attorney, and Misty Carausu, the Alameda County Sheriff officer who captured Muller in 2015, worked together to link Muller to the cases and obtain the confessions.

=== Folsom Lake abduction and rape (1993) ===
Muller pleaded guilty to kidnapping and rape charges in June 2025 in Sacramento County for a crime he committed in 1993. At age 16, Muller forced a teen couple from their tent at Folsom Lake with a gun. Muller carried the female victim away to rape her after tying the male victim up. He was sentenced to 11 years to life in prison.

=== Santa Clara County home invasions (2009) ===
In January 2025, Muller entered a guilty plea for two home invasions, one in Palo Alto and the other in Mountain View, in September and October 2009, for which he was originally a suspect. In both cases, the victims awoke to find Muller on top of them, after which he drugged them with NyQuil and informed them he intended to rape them. They both persuaded Muller to let them go without sexually assaulting them. Upon leaving, he gave them crime prevention advice, such as suggesting one of them get a dog for protection. DNA testing confirmed Muller was the perpetrator of the crimes. He was sentenced in March 2025 to two life sentences for the cases.

=== San Ramon kidnapping (2015) ===
In January 2025, Muller was charged with three counts of kidnapping for ransom stemming from an incident that occurred in 2015, two weeks after he kidnapped Huskins. Muller unlawfully detained the three victims and extorted them for tens of thousands of dollars. The confessions were confirmed through DNA testing. The assistant district attorney for Contra Costa County, California, said the victims did not report the crime in 2015 out of fear. Muller pleaded no contest in July 2025 and was sentenced to life.

== Personal life ==
Muller married a woman he met while studying abroad in Prague. She filed for divorce in December 2012. He remarried while incarcerated in Sacramento County Jail.

=== Bibliography ===
Muller co-authored several articles for legal publications.

- Gomes, Andrea; Spolin, Aaron; Muller, Matt; Shabecoff, Alexa (2007). "SERVING IMMIGRANTS AND REFUGEES: A Guide to Careers in the Law" (PDF). Harvard Law School Bernard Koteen Office of Public Interest Advising.
- Linzer, Drew; Menefee-Libey, David; Muller, Matt (July 2003). "The 2002 California Twenty-Ninth Congressional District Race". PS: Political Science & Politics. 36 (3): 404. doi:10.1017/S1049096503002555. ISSN 1537-5935.
- Muller, M; Anker, D; Rosenberg, L (2006). "Escobar v Gonzales: A Backwards Step for Child Asylum Seekers and the Rule of Law in Particular Social Group Asylum Claims" (PDF). UC Davis Journal of Juvenile Law and Policy. 10 (1): 243–250.
- Anker, D. E.; Muller, M. D. (October 17, 2007). "Explaining Credibility Assessment in the Asylum Procedure". International Journal of Refugee Law. 19 (3): 599–602. doi:10.1093/ijrl/eem051. ISSN 0953-8186.

== See also ==
- List of serial rapists
