= Murder of April Tinsley =

1988 kidnapping and murder in Indiana

April Marie Tinsley
- Born: March 18, 1980; Fort Wayne, Indiana, U.S.
- Died: April 1, 1988 (aged 8); Fort Wayne, Indiana, U.S.
- Cause of death: Asphyxiation
- Body discovered: April 4, 1988, Spencerville, Indiana, U.S.
- Resting place: Greenlawn Memorial Park, Fort Wayne, Allen County, Indiana, U.S. 41°03′45″N 85°13′45″W
- Known for: Victim of child murder

On April 1, 1988, April Marie Tinsley, an eight-year-old girl from Fort Wayne, Indiana, was kidnapped, raped, and strangled to death. The murder went unsolved for more than thirty years and became one of Indiana's most infamous cold cases.

Between 1990 and 2004, Tinsley's killer left a series of anonymous messages and notes in the Fort Wayne area openly boasting about the murder and threatening to kill again. The case was investigated by the Fort Wayne Police Department (FWPD) and the Federal Bureau of Investigation (FBI), and was covered in the television series America's Most Wanted, Crime Watch Daily, The Genetic Detective, and on the cable network Investigation Discovery.

Using forensic genealogy, the FWPD identified Tinsley's killer as 59-year-old John Miller in July 2018. On December 21, Miller pleaded guilty and was sentenced to eighty years in prison on the charges of child molestation (rape) and murder.

== Kidnapping and murder ==
April Tinsley was a member of the children's choir at the Faith United Methodist Church, and a second-grader attending Fairfield Elementary School. On April 1, 1988, Good Friday, she was playing with two of her friends, and they were moving between houses. Tinsley went back to retrieve her umbrella and then disappeared around 3:00 pm.

John Miller, who later pleaded guilty to murdering Tinsley, said he had planned to kidnap a child, but he had not seen April before abducting her. He said that he asked her to get into his car, and he took her to his trailer where he raped and killed her. At night, he took her body to a ditch.

Tinsley's mother reported her daughter missing to the police when she did not arrive home for dinner that night. The initial search for Tinsley included 250 Fort Wayne police officers and 50 volunteers. A witness later reported seeing a white man in his 30s forcing a girl believed to be Tinsley into his blue pickup truck.

A jogger found Tinsley's body on April 4, 1988, in a ditch just west of Spencerville, Indiana. Near the site, investigators found one of Tinsley's shoes and a sex toy in a shopping bag. A motorist later reported seeing a blue pickup truck near this site. Tinsley's autopsy report suggested she had been raped and then strangled to death. The report determined that she had been dead for about one or two days before she was discovered and that she had been placed in the ditch four hours before this discovery.

Two local radio stations established a reward fund on April 5, 1988. Additional funds were established for Tinsley's burial and her family. Tinsley's memorial service was held on April 8, 1988, at the Faith United Methodist Church, and she was buried in the Greenlawn Memorial Park.

== Investigations ==
The early police investigation led authorities to a 34-year-old suspect, who was charged with child molestation in a separate case but was acquitted of those charges the next month. Ninety members of the Fort Wayne community formed the volunteer group APRIL (Associated Parents Regional Independent League, or later Abduction Prevention Reconnaissance and Information League) on April 20, 1988, to help police solve cases involving missing children.

On June 24, 2005, the Tinsley family held a press conference at the Allen County Courthouse asking for leads in the case. In June 2009, Indiana authorities asked the Federal Bureau of Investigation (FBI) task force Child Abduction Rapid Deployment (CARD) to help them solve the murder.

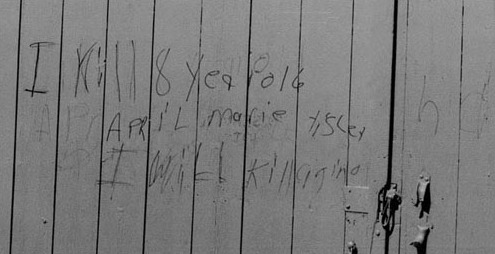
The message discovered in St. Joseph Township in May 1990 referencing Tinsley's death

On May 21, 1990, police found a message on a St. Joseph Township barn reading, "I kill 8 year old April Marie Tisley," [sic] and "did you find the other shoe haha I will kill again." The message was written with crayons that were found near the barn. Investigators initially believed this threat could be connected to the murder of 7-year-old Sarah Jean Bowker, whose body was found on June 14, 1990, in Fort Wayne. Local and state police formed a homicide team in April 1991 to investigate Tinsley and Bowker's cases. On August 7, 1991, the FBI's Behavioral Science Unit determined that, although Tinsley and Bowker's cases were similar, they were ultimately unrelated.

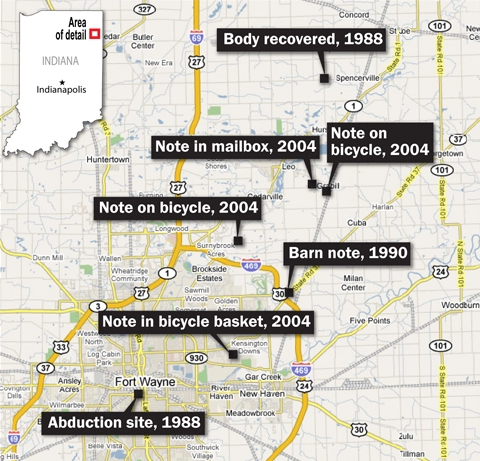
Map of Allen County, Indiana, depicting locations of Tinsley's abduction, her body discovery, and the notes left by her murderer between 1990 and 2004

During the Memorial Day weekend in 2004, four notes were found in the Fort Wayne area that are believed to have been written by Tinsley's murderer. Three of these notes were left on girls' bicycles, and another one was left in a mailbox. Three notes were placed in plastic bags, along with used condoms and Polaroid pictures of a man's lower body. One of these notes read, "Hi honey... I been watching you....I am the same person that kidnapped an rape an kill april tinsley, ... You are my next victim....if you don't report this to police an if I don't see this in the paper tomorrow or on the local news...I will blow up your house." [sic] The DNA from the condoms matched the police's DNA profile of the suspect, confirming to investigators the incidents were connected.

In April 2009, the television program America's Most Wanted ran a segment on Tinsley's case and asked for tips. The investigative series Crime Watch Daily covered the murder in an episode that aired in 2016. Tinsley's case was featured in an episode of On the Case with Paula Zahn that aired on July 15, 2018, just hours after an arrest was made in the case. On October 26, 2018, the Indiana State Police honored three Fort Wayne investigators for helping authorities identify John D. Miller as a suspect in the Tinsley case.

== Police profile of the suspect ==
Soon after the murder, police released a composite sketch of the suspect based on the account of a person who said they saw Tinsley's kidnapper. On April 26, 1988, police sent DNA samples of Tinsley and five suspects to a private lab in Germantown, Maryland, for profiling, giving inconclusive results.

The FBI's Behavioral Analysis Unit created a profile of the suspect in 2009, describing him as a "Preferential Child Sex Offender", meaning "he has a long-term and persistent sexual desire for children." The profile described the murderer as a white male, then in his 40s through 50s, living or working in northeast Fort Wayne/Allen County with a low to medium income.

In June 2015, the Virginia-based company Parabon released a "Snapshot" composite sketch of the suspect based on information from his DNA. Police released an updated version of this sketch in early May 2016.

== Perpetrator ==
In May 2018, a Fort Wayne Police Department detective sent a sample of the suspect's DNA to the forensics company Parabon NanoLabs, which used the genealogy website GEDmatch to identify the suspect's relatives. On July 2, 2018, the genealogist CeCe Moore narrowed down the list of suspects to two brothers, including 59-year-old John D. Miller of Grabill, Indiana, whose neighbors described him as secluded and often angry. The police found used condoms in Miller's trash, and collected DNA that matched the suspect's DNA.

Detectives approached Miller at his house on July 15, 2018, and asked him to come to talk with them at the police station. After advising him of his rights, investigators asked him if he knew why they wanted to talk to him. According to police, he replied, "April Tinsley." During an interview at the police station, he confessed to the murder, saying he abducted Tinsley, raped her and choked her to death in his trailer.

Officials charged him with murder, child molestation, and confinement, and he pleaded not guilty in a court hearing on July 19, 2018. On December 7, 2018, Miller changed his plea to guilty, saying he raped Tinsley and strangled her with his bare hands. He was sentenced to 80 years in prison: 50 years for murder and 30 years for child molestation.

After sentencing, he was housed at the Indiana Department of Correction Reception Diagnostic Center in Plainfield. On January 16, 2019, he was moved to the New Castle Correctional Facility. Miller's earliest possible release date was scheduled for July 15, 2058, when he would have been 99 years old. However, Miller died of natural causes at St. Vincent Indianapolis Hospital on September 4, 2025.

== Aftermath ==
In April 2015, in the Hoagland–Masterson neighborhood of Fort Wayne, construction started on a memorial dedicated to April's memory called "April's Garden". On July 28, 2018, a memorial walk starting at this garden was held in honor of April.

April Tinsley's mother held a balloon launch at April's Garden on April 4, 2018. This service was in remembrance of her daughter and other child victims of violence. The following day, at Fairfield Elementary School, a pink magnolia tree and a bench were formally dedicated to April's memory. This dedication was followed by a candlelight vigil.

In May 2019, nine investigators who had worked to secure the arrest and conviction of April's murderer became recipients of the National Association of Police Organizations (NAPO) national policing award. This award was in recognition of their tireless, collaborative efforts conducted over the span of 30 years to see April's murderer brought to justice. These investigators were from the Indiana State Police, the FBI, the Allen County Sheriff's Department, and the Fort Wayne Police Department. NAPO heralded them as being among the most eminent and dedicated officers in America.

== See also ==
- List of kidnappings (1980–1989)
- List of murdered American children
- List of solved missing person cases (1980s)
- List of punishments for murder in the United States

== Cited works and further reading ==
=== Literature ===
- Ammeson, Jane S. (2007). Murders That Made Headlines: Crimes of Indiana. Bloomington: Indiana University Press. ISBN 978-0-253-03126-6.
- Jeffers, H. Paul (1991). Profiles In Evil: Chilling Case Histories From the Files of the FBI's Violent Crime Unit. London: Warner Books. ISBN 978-0-7088-5449-5.
- Newton, Michael (2009). The Encyclopedia of Unsolved Crimes. New York: Facts on File. p. 123. ISBN 978-0-8160-7818-9.
- Thompson, Emily G. (2018). Unsolved Child Murders: Eighteen American Cases, 1956–1998. North Carolina: McFarland & Company Inc. ISBN 978-1-4766-7000-3.

=== Television ===
- "The Deadly Playdate". The Genetic Detective (Season 1, Episode 4). ABC Television. Archived from the original on June 17, 2020.
- "I Will Kill Again". Predator at Large (Season 1, Episode 6). TV Maze.
- "Notes from a Killer". On the Case with Paula Zahn. Investigation Discovery. July 16, 2018.
