= Leroy Nash =

American murderer (1915–2010)

- Born: Viva Leroy Nash; September 10, 1915; Salt Lake City, Utah
- Died: February 12, 2010 (aged 94); Florence, Arizona
- Known for: Being one of the oldest prisoners ever
- Status: Deceased
- Criminal charges: Armed robbery, murder

Details
- Victims: David J. Woodhurst; David West

Viva Leroy Nash (September 10, 1915 – February 12, 2010) was an American career criminal and convicted murderer who was the oldest American inmate on death row at the time of his death in February 2010.

Born in Salt Lake City, Utah to Mormon missionaries, Nash spent much of his life in and out of prison for crimes including transporting stolen vehicles, robbery, and attempted murder. He was first imprisoned in 1930 at 15 years old for armed robbery. He escaped prison around 1931.

In 1947 at 32 years old, he was sentenced to prison again after shooting a Connecticut police officer. He spent almost 25 years behind bars before being released in 1972.

In 1977 he was sentenced to death for having murdered postal carrier David J. Woodhurst, but escaped from a prison work crew in 1982, at age 66, where soon after he went into a coin shop in Phoenix, Arizona, and shot 23 year-old employee David West dead.

Nash was sentenced to death in 1983. His attorneys claimed that senility had rendered him legally incompetent to be executed, describing him as a "doddering old man, who can't hear, can't see, can't walk, and is very, very loony". The sentence was never carried out; Nash died of natural causes on February 12, 2010, at the age of 94 in the Arizona Eyman State Prison Complex. At the time of his death, he was the oldest person on death row in the US.

== See also ==
- List of United States death row inmates
