= List of Arizona state prisons =

There are currently 14 prison complexes and 2 correctional treatment facilities, for state prisoners in the U.S. state of Arizona. This number does not include federal prisons, detention centers for the U.S. Immigration and Customs Enforcement, or county jails located in the state. There are 10 state prisons operated by the Arizona Department of Corrections, Rehabilitation and Reentry (ADCRR), 4 private prisons and 2 private correctional treatment centers.

As of 2007 Arizona had exported more than 2000 prisoners to privately run facilities in Oklahoma and Indiana, a number that would have been higher if not for a riot of Arizona prisoners at the GEO Group's New Castle Correctional Facility on April 27, 2007, protesting the practice. As of 2013, the states of Vermont, California and Hawaii export prisoners to facilities in Arizona.

== State-operated prisons ==
- Arizona State Prison Complex – Douglas (capacity 2,148) (Opened in 1984)
- Arizona State Prison Complex – Eyman (capacity 4,549) (Opened in 1991)
- Arizona State Prison Complex – Lewis (capacity 4,397) (Opened in 1977)
- Arizona State Prison Complex – Perryville (capacity 2,382) (Opened in 1981)
- Arizona State Prison Complex – Phoenix (capacity 1,042) (Opened in 1979)
- Arizona State Prison Complex – Safford (capacity 1,717) (Opened in 1968)
- Arizona State Prison Complex – Tucson (capacity 4,358) (Opened in 1978)
- Arizona State Prison Complex – Winslow (capacity 1,928) (Opened in 1990)
- Arizona State Prison Complex – Yuma (capacity 2,245) (Opened in 1987)

== Privately operated prisons ==
- Arizona State Prison – Kingman (operated by GEO Group)(capacity 3,508) (Opened 2004)
- Arizona State Prison Florence-West (operated by the GEO Group) (capacity 500 male DUI and 250 Criminal Aliens(CA) Minimum Security) (Opened 1997)
- Arizona State Prison Phoenix-West (operated by the GEO Group) (capacity 500) (Opened 1996)
- Marana Community Correctional Treatment Facility (operated by Management and Training Corporation) (capacity 500) (Opened 1994)
- Central Arizona Correctional Facility (operated by CoreCivic) (capacity 1,280) (Opened 2006)
- Red Rock Correctional Center (operated by the Corrections Corporation of America) (capacity 2,000) Medium Security. (Opened 2006)
- La Palma Correctional Facility (Opened 2008)
