= American Nightmare (TV series) =

2024 true crime television series

- Genre: True crime; Docuseries
- Directed by: Bernadette Higgins; Felicity Morris
- No. of seasons: 1
- No. of episodes: 3

Original release
- Network: Netflix
- Release: January 17, 2024

American Nightmare is a true crime television series directed by Bernadette Higgins and Felicity Morris. The series covers the March 2015 kidnapping of Denise Huskins from the home she shared with her boyfriend Aaron Quinn in Vallejo, California.

== Synopsis ==
The Vallejo police department and the FBI assumed that the kidnapping of Denise Huskins was a hoax staged by Huskins and her boyfriend Aaron Quinn, and Huskins was labeled "the real Gone Girl" by the media. The couple is eventually vindicated when a detective connects another home invasion in Dublin, California, to Huskins' case, leading to the arrest and conviction of Matthew Muller.

== Episodes ==
No. overall	No. in season	Title	Original release date
1	1	"Part One: The Boyfriend"	January 17, 2024
2	2	"Part Two: Gone Girl"	January 17, 2024
3	3	"Part Three: The Others"	January 17, 2024

== Release ==
All three episodes of American Nightmare were released on Netflix on January 17, 2024.

== Reception ==
=== Critical response ===
The series has a 96% approval rating on the review aggregator website Rotten Tomatoes, based on 23 reviews. The website's critical consensus reads, "Equal parts infuriating and suspenseful, American Nightmare is an instructive chronicle of institutional bias making a horrifying crime even worse."

=== Accolades ===
At the 9th Critics' Choice Documentary Awards, American Nightmare was nominated for Best True Crime Documentary.
