= Eugene Britt =

Convicted American serial killer

- Born: Eugene Victor Britt; November 4, 1957 (age 68); Gary, Indiana, U.S.
- Status: Imprisoned
- Convictions: Murder x7 Rape x2 Assault x1
- Penalty: Life imprisonment + 100 years (Paulsen); 245 years (others)

Details
- Victims: 7–10
- Span of crimes: May – September 1995
- Country: United States
- State: Indiana
- Date apprehended: November 3, 1995
- Imprisoned at: Indiana State Prison, Michigan City, Indiana

Eugene Victor Britt (born November 4, 1957) is an American serial killer and rapist who killed at least seven girls and women in Gary and Portage, Indiana, between May and September 1995. Suspected in a total of ten murders, he was convicted and sentenced to life imprisonment.

== Biography ==
Eugene Britt was born on November 4, 1957, in a large impoverished family residing in Gary, Indiana. Both of his parents were alcoholics, with his father frequently beating his mother. Due to this constant abuse, at age 14, Eugene dropped out of school and fled from home, living on the streets and using drugs. Around this time, he began to show signs of an intellectual disability.

In April 1978, he attacked a 17-year-old girl who was returning home from the Roosevelt High School, robbing and raping her. Britt would later be arrested for this crime, receiving a 30-year sentence in December of that year. After serving half of his sentence, he was paroled in August 1993 and returned to Gary, where he resorted to sleeping in homeless shelters due to financial constraints. During this period, he lived with one of his sisters and changed several jobs, doing low-skilled work. He preferred to spend most of his free time travelling around the city, riding on his bicycle. In early autumn 1995, Britt was hit by a train, causing him severe injuries due to which he had to use a wheelchair for the next several weeks.

== Exposure ==
On November 3, 1995, Eugene was arrested on suspicion of killing 8-year-old Sarah Lynn Paulsen, whose body had been found on August 22 near her home in Portage.

While investigating her death, officers found about 20 fibers of blue polyester yarns and green colors which matched the uniforms worn by employees of the Hardee's restaurant chain. At that time, Britt worked in a local division based in Portage and had been sent home in the middle of the day for an administrative offense, and was even seen riding his bicycle near the crime scene. Upon learning this, police officers confiscated his uniform so they could examine it.

Three days later, Britt confessed to killing Paulsen to Clyde Smith, the head of the homeless shelter where he had lived until his arrest, in addition to nine other murders. After that, Smith convinced Eugene to give himself up to law enforcement, which he did on the following day. During an 8-hour interrogation, Britt confessed to killing ten people in total, including Sarah Paulsen. According to his confessions, he had killed the other victims between May 9 and September 12, dumping their bodies in various locations around Gary. He indicated the dumping sites on a map, and much to the police's surprise, at least seven of these deaths had previously been ruled as non-homicidal in nature. For example, one of the victims' bodies was found in a state of severe decomposition, with the medical examiner unable to establish the cause of death.

Britt's victims were predominantly young girls and women, excluding one man, aged between 8 and 51. One of the victims was a prostitute. During the interrogation, he claimed to have committed the murders on the orders from voices in his head, attacking the victims in desolate areas, from behind, after which he dragged them to the side, where he raped and thereafter strangled the chosen victim. The circumstances surrounding the man's murder, according to his testimony, were different from the others: according to Eugene, two men had attempted to steal his bicycle, causing it to break down, but he managed to frighten them off with his imposing physique. Because of this, he got lost while searching for spare parts. After some time, he managed to track down one of the robbers, whereupon he proceeded to beat up and then strangle him. Britt additionally clarified that the injuries caused from the train were intentional, as he had planned on committing suicide.

Based on Britt's testimony in the following days, police found some bones and clothes in one of the indicated gravesites, but in December of that year, thanks to dental analysis of the jaws, the victim was identified as 24-year-old Tonya Dunlap, who had been missing since July 18 of that year. Despite the claims that there were 10 victims in total, investigators were successful in identifying only seven of them.

== Trial ==
Soon after his arrest, Britt was indicted in Porter County for the murder of Sarah Paulsen. In May 1996, on the basis of a plea bargain and his intellectual disabilities, he was spared the death penalty and instead received life imprisonment plus 100 years. In the summer, he was transferred to the Lake County Jail, pending the completion of further investigations. In February 2000, after a thorough investigation into his claims, Britt was charged with six more murders and the rape of a 13-year-old girl.

In mid-2000, Britt's lawyers said that his mental state had severely deteriorated and was criminally insane, arguing that he couldn't be liable for his deeds and needed compulsory treatment. By request of the prosecutors, a forensic psychiatric examination was carried out by the end of the year, which deemed that Eugene Britt was sane and capable of standing trial; however, the opening trial was postponed several times due to various reasons and circumstances, beginning in 2006. On October 6, 2006, Britt pleaded guilty to the murders of 14-year-old Nakita Moore, 24-year-old Tonya Dunlap, 41-year-old Maxine Walker, 50-year-old Betty Askew, 27-year-old Michelle Burns and 41-year-old Debra McHenry, in addition to the assault and rape of the 13-year-old girl. After another psychological exam, he was deemed intellectually disabled, leading to the court showing leniency towards him. On November 3, Britt was sentenced to an additional 245 years imprisonment. After the verdict's announcement, he burst into tears, expressing remorse for what he had done and asking for forgiveness from the victims' relatives and family.

After the trial, he was transferred to the Indiana State Prison, located 80 kilometers away from Chicago. As of July 2026, Britt is still alive and serving his sentence, under the prison number "963641".

== See also ==
- List of serial killers in the United States
