= New Castle Correctional Facility =

Prison in New Castle, Indiana, US

Coordinates: 39°57′46″N 85°22′18″W

- Interactive map of New Castle Correctional Facility
- Location: 1000 Van Nuys Road New Castle, Indiana, U.S.
- Status: open
- Security class: mixed
- Capacity: appr. 3,270
- Opened: 2002
- Managed by: GEO Group

New Castle Correctional Facility is a privately run (but state-owned) prison located in New Castle, Indiana, United States. It opened in 2002. In September 2005, the state signed a contract with the for-profit GEO Group, Inc. of Boca Raton, Florida, to run the prison. The facility is rated as minimum- to medium-security, but also has a maximum-security psychiatric unit and annex. It is currently the second-largest prison in Indiana, and can hold approximately 3,270 inmates.

== Riot of April 24, 2007 ==
On Tuesday, April 24, 2007, it was about noon when a disturbance in the prison dining hall occurred. A little after 2:00 p.m., the local New Castle police department responded en masse, as did forces from the Henry County Fire Department and Sheriff's Department. Sheriff's Deputies from adjacent Delaware County, along with elements of the Indiana State Police also responded.

Reportedly, it started with a cluster of Arizona prisoners transported there against their will consequent to a memorandum of understanding with the state of Arizona and GEO Group. They refused to wear state-issued smocks over T-shirts as a display of non-compliance during the midday meal. This is when Captain Deaton stepped in and tried to handcuff several offenders and was severely beaten by three inmates.

These prisoners were reportedly picked for being non-violent and generally getting along with the rules; it is suggested the Arizona convicts felt they were, in effect, being punished for obeying the rules, and had they been less compliant back in Arizona, they would have remained there. An earlier deal with California fell through when that state was unable to come up with enough non-violent prisoners willing to volunteer for the transfer; the Arizona convicts were transferred on a non-voluntary basis.

This was not the first time Arizona transportees had been involved in prison disturbances in other states.

Two news helicopters from regional NBC and CBS affiliates provided live images carried on MSNBC's WTHR, and Fox News. Piles of burning debris and smoke plumes were evident, reportedly mattresses, combustible furniture and garbage.

Within two hours, full order and authority was restored, though some inmates continued to be audibly angry for some time afterwards. Shortly after 3:30 p.m., J. David Donahue, then the Commissioner of the Indiana Department of Correction, reported that conditions were returning to normal.

Two correctional officers were reported to have received very slight injuries. Seven prisoners were treated for minor injuries at the prison.

The state suspended the transfer of additional Arizona inmates pending an investigation. Governor Mitch Daniels said the transportees directly involved in the disturbance would be returned to Arizona.

=== Aftermath ===
The DOC moved 69 Arizona transportees to the Reception Diagnostic Center in Plainfield, Indiana where they were placed in segregation the night of the riot.

A month after the riot, a "post-event analysis" was released by the Indiana Department of Corrections. This report states

At the time of this writing the Indiana State Police indicated that criminal charges would be recommended against one Indiana offender and 25 offenders from Arizona. Aggregate recommended charges include Rioting, Battery, Unauthorized Possession of Weapons, Intimidation, Theft, Criminal Mischief, Criminal Confinement, and Battery by Bodily Waste.

== Notable Inmates ==
Inmate Name	Register Number	Status	Details
Eugene Britt	963641	Serving a life sentence without parole plus 245 years.	Murdered 7 people in 1995, though only convicted for 3 of them, along with the rape of a 13-year-old.
John D. Miller	264854	Serving an 80-year sentence. Earliest possible release date in 2058.	Convicted in 2018 for the cold case of the 1988 rape and Murder of April Tinsley.
James "Jamey" Noel	301710	He pled guilty and was sentenced to 15-years with 3 years suspended. His wife Misty and daughter Kasey were arrested but haven't been to trial as of Nov. 29, 2024.	Southern Indiana Sheriff who was the first sheriff on the A&E series '60 Days In' along with his wife Misty Noel and daughter Kasey stole millions from the taxpayers in his county. https://indianacapitalchronicle.com/2024/10/14/former-indiana-sheriff-jamey-noel-sentenced-to-15-years-in-prison-as-part-of-plea-deal/

== Sources ==
- Post event analysis by Indiana DOC (*.pdf), Retrieved 24 May 2007
- Indianapolis Star article, 24 May 2007
- Indiana DOC press release
- Fort Wayne News-Sentinel DEAD LINK
- Indiana State Police response (WTHR/MSNBC)
- CNN story
- Geo Group Inc
- nbcnews.com story
- PCI (anti-private corrections site)
