= Arizona Department of Corrections, Rehabilitation and Reentry =

Law enforcement agency

Arizona Department of Corrections, Rehabilitation & Reentry
- Shoulder patch

- Current breast badge
- Common name: Arizona Department of Corrections
- Abbreviation: ADCRR, ADC (formerly)

Agency overview
- Formed: 1875
- Employees: 10,000+
- Annual budget: 1,131,935.4

Jurisdictional structure
- Operations jurisdiction: Arizona, US
- Map of Arizona Department of Corrections, Rehabilitation & Reentry's jurisdiction
- Area: 113,998 square miles (295,250 km^{2})
- Population: 6,500,180 (2008 est.)
- General nature: Civilian police

Operational structure
- Headquarters: 1601 West Jefferson Street, Phoenix, Arizona 85007, US
- Agency executive: Ryan Thornell, Ph.D., Director

Website
- Arizona Department of Corrections Website

The Arizona Department of Corrections, Rehabilitation & Reentry (ADCRR), commonly and formerly referred to as simply the Arizona Department of Corrections, is the statutory law enforcement agency responsible for the incarceration of inmates in 13 prisons in the U.S. state of Arizona. As of December 2015, the ADC manages over 42,643 imprisoned inmates and over 5,466 inmates who have been paroled or that are statutorily released. ADC is also in involved in recruitment and training of Correctional Officers at the Correctional Officer Training Academy (COTA) in Tucson, Arizona. The ADC is headquartered in Downtown Phoenix.

== Funding ==
| Year | Total funding (millions) |
|---|---|
| 2002 | $623.0 |
| 2003 | $626.6 |
| 2004 | $692.7 |
| 2005 | $755.0 |
| 2006 | $825.6 |
| 2007 | $901.3 |
| 2008 | $1020.0 |
| 2009 | $1076.2 |
| 2013 (Estimate) | $1131.9 |

== Death row ==
Arizona's death row for males is located at the Rincon Unit of the Arizona State Prison Complex – Tucson. Female death row prisoners are housed at the Lumley Unit of the Arizona State Prison Complex – Perryville. Executions occur at the Central Unit of the Arizona State Prison Complex – Florence.

== Facilities ==
There are currently forty-eight state prisons, geographically grouped into fourteen complexes and two correctional treatment facilities in Arizona. This number does not include federal prisons, detention centers for the US Immigration and Customs Enforcement, or county jails

As of 2007, Arizona had exported more than 2,000 prisoners to privately run facilities in Oklahoma and Indiana, a number that would have been higher if not for a riot of Arizona prisoners at the GEO Group's New Castle Correctional Facility on April 27, 2007, protesting the practice. As of 2013, the states of Vermont, California and Hawaii export prisoners to facilities in Arizona.

== Incidents ==
In July 2014, a teacher was raped at the Meadows Unit of the Arizona State Prison Complex at Eyman. She had been left alone in a room with then 21-year-old Jacob Harvey, who stabbed her multiple times with a pen and raped her. The radio she was issued was tuned to a frequency not in use. The officers were found to have failed to make their required checks. The state settled the matter for an undisclosed amount and the Department of Corrections denies any wrongdoing.

In July 2015, at the medium security housing area at the Arizona State Prison-Kingman a four-day riot damaged facilities so extensively as to require major repairs. More than one thousand inmates had to be moved to other locations. The facility was being run by Management and Training Corporation under a contract with the department in which Director Charles L. Ryan failed to ensure contractual obligations were met.

In August 2015, Prisoner Cynthia Apkaw hanged herself in her cell. Officers had not made their required checks and later faked records to conceal their misconduct.

In February 2016, officers failed to conduct required checks on Scott Saba who hanged himself in his cell. His body was discovered by Correctional Officers who had finished their shifts and subsequently didn't have the equipment required to provide aid.

In April 2016, thirteen prison staff were fired and six more disciplined as a result of an investigation into the two most recent prison suicides.

== Fallen officers ==
Since its establishment, ten officers of the ADCRR have died while on duty.

== See also ==
- List of law enforcement agencies in Arizona
- List of United States state correction agencies
- Prison
- List of U.S. state prisons
- List of Arizona state prisons
