= Phoenix Goodyear Airport =

Airport in Maricopa County, Arizona

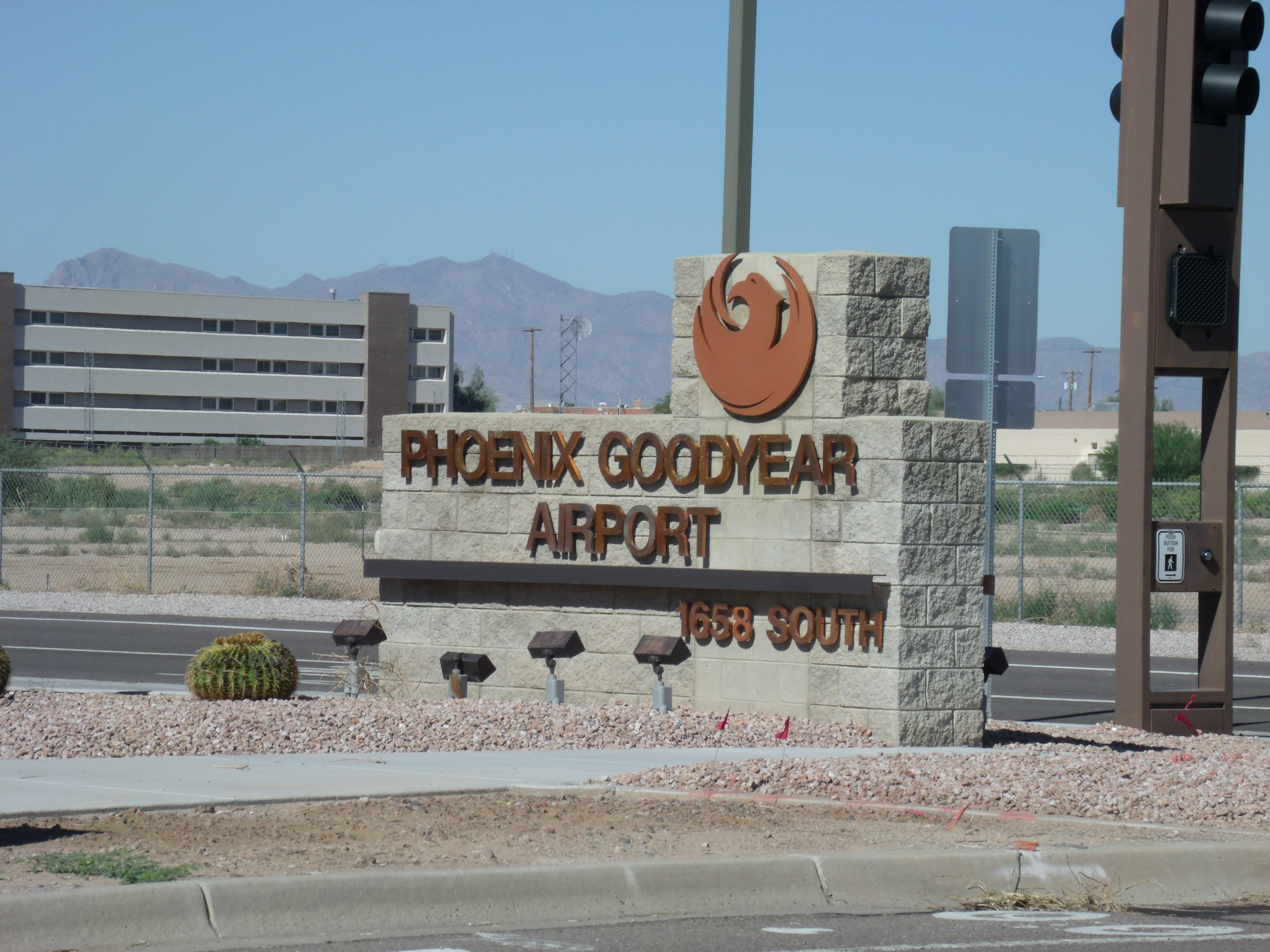

- IATA: GYR; ICAO: KGYR; FAA LID: GYR

Summary
- Airport type: Public
- Owner: City of Phoenix
- Serves: Phoenix, Arizona
- Location: Goodyear, United States
- Hub for: CTC Aviation; KLM Flight Academy
- Elevation AMSL: 969 ft / 296 m
- Coordinates: 33°25′41″N 112°22′28″W
- Website: goodyearairport.com

Map

Runways
Direction	Length		Surface
Direction	ft	m	Surface
3/21	8,500	2,591	Asphalt

Helipads
Number	Length		Surface
Number	ft	m	Surface
H1	64	20	Concrete

Statistics (2020)
- Aircraft operations: 79,599
- Based aircraft: 215
- Source: Federal Aviation Administration

Phoenix Goodyear Airport (IATA: GYR, ICAO: KGYR, FAA LID: GYR) (formerly Goodyear Municipal Airport) is a public airport in Goodyear, Arizona in Maricopa County, Arizona, United States.

== History ==
It was built during World War II as a naval air facility and officially opened in 1941 as NAF Litchfield Park (NAF), then upgraded to naval air station status and renamed NAS Litchfield Park. Its primary role after the end of World War II was storage and preservation of obsolete or excess U.S. Navy, U.S. Marine Corps and U.S. Coast Guard aircraft. In 1968, all Department of Defense and U.S. Coast Guard aircraft preservation and storage was consolidated at the Military Aircraft Storage and Disposition Center (MASDC) at Davis-Monthan AFB in Tucson and NAS Litchfield Park was slated for closure.

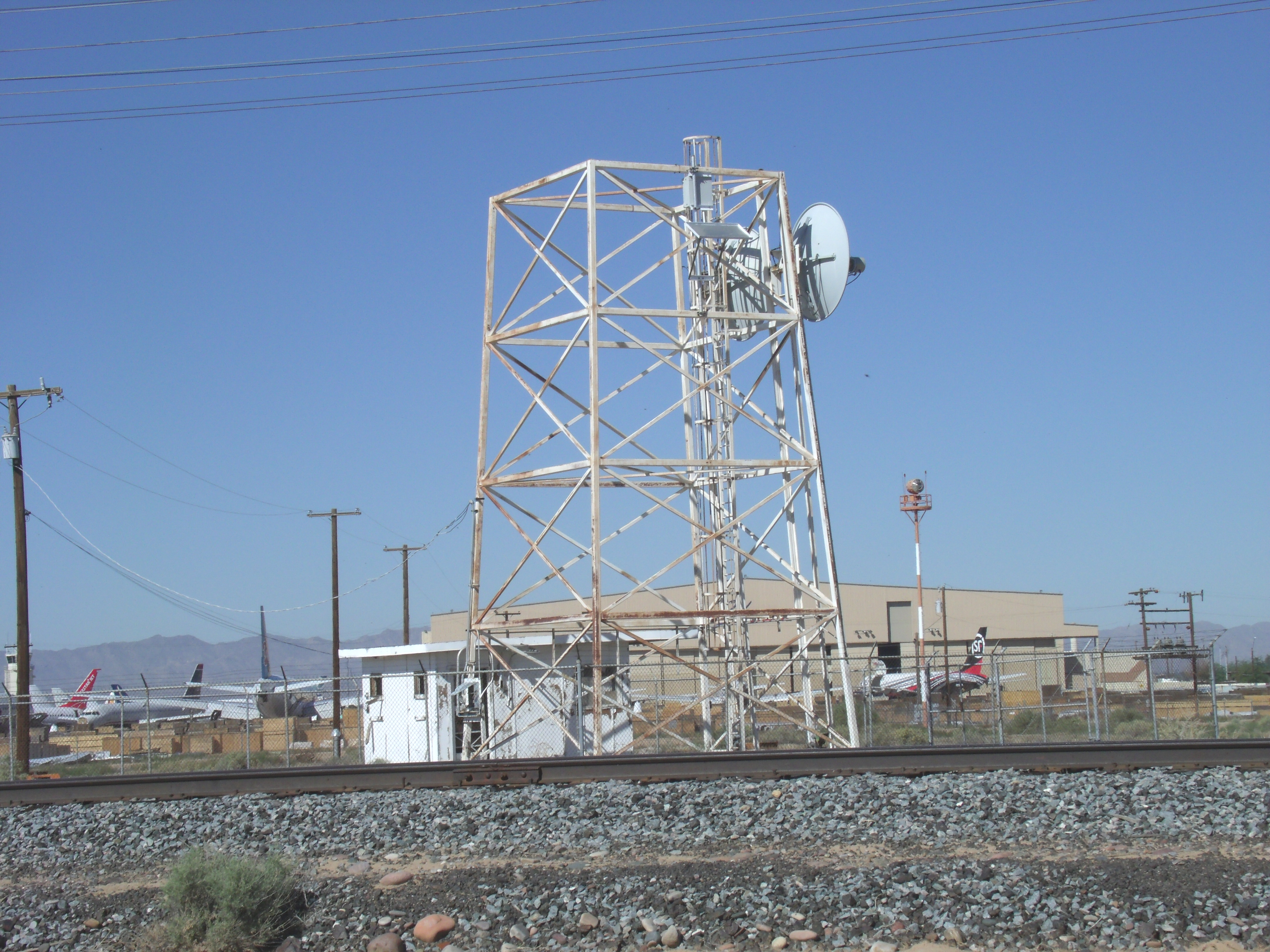
Old World War II Radar Tower was built in 1941 and located in the Phoenix Goodyear Airport (formerly Goodyear Municipal Airport). The airport was used as a naval air facility during World War II.

Following the closure of NAS Litchfield Park in 1968, the Goodyear company discussed using it as its Aviation Products Division. The airport is not served by any airlines. Ultimately, the city of Phoenix purchased the airport as a general aviation reliever airport for Phoenix Sky Harbor International Airport. The airport is, however, a major keep and maintenance spot, and the aircraft of many airlines, both domestic and international, can be spotted there.

Phoenix-Goodyear Airport is a Superfund site due to a number of soil and groundwater contaminants from its time as a military installation.

== Facilities ==
Phoenix Goodyear Airport covers 789 acres (319 ha) at an elevation of 969 ft (295 m) above mean sea level. GYR has one asphalt runway and one concrete helipad:

- Runway 3/21 measuring 8,500 ft × 150 ft (2,591 m × 46 m)
- Helipad H1, measuring 64 ft × 64 ft (20 m × 20 m)

In 2020, the airport had 79,599 aircraft operations, average 218 per day: 94% general aviation, <1% airline, 1% military and 4% air taxi. 215 aircraft were based at the airport: 183 single engine, 6 multi-engine, 19 jet, 6 military, and 1 helicopter.

== Tenants ==
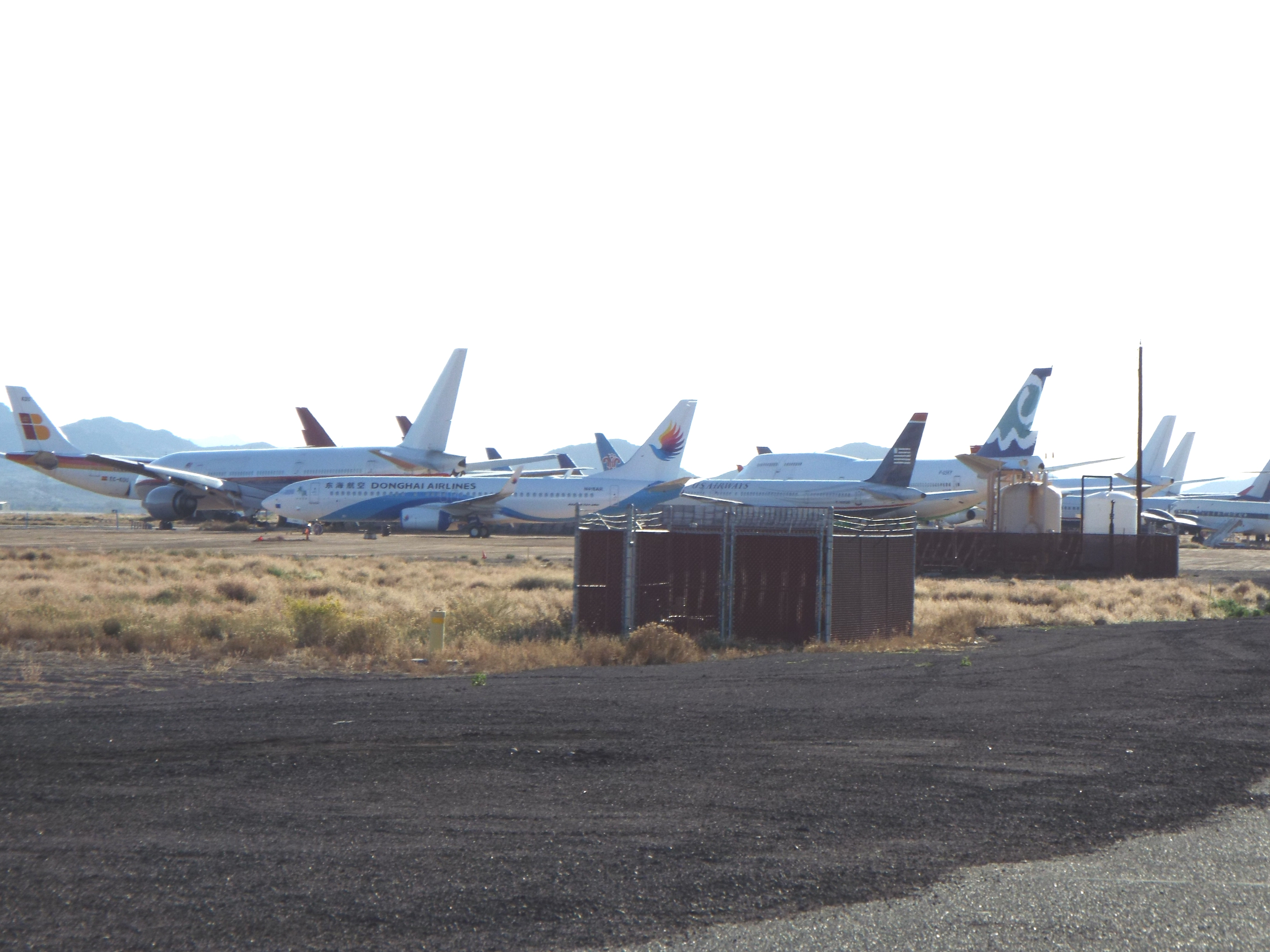
The Phoenix-Goodyear Airport "bone-yard" where planes no longer in use are kept

The airfield is home to several companies offering aircraft maintenance and commercial pilot training:

- AerSale, Inc. operates a maintenance facility on the airfield which comprises maintenance, storage and disposal. The northern side of the airfield is used for storage and many Boeing 737, Airbus A340 and Boeing 747s are visible from the road as they await their fate.
- Airline Training Center Arizona (ATCA) was the training facility for the Lufthansa Flight Training of German Lufthansa Airlines. Basic flight training for German Air Force student pilots was also conducted in Grob G 120 aircraft. In 2022 the entire Center was sold to United Airlines.
- CAE Oxford Aviation Academy (CAE OAA) is the US name for CAE Oxford Aviation Academy, a British company specializing in training airline pilots for United Kingdom, British Airways and other European airlines. CAE OAA moved to Falcon Field in October 2013 and is no longer based at KGYR.
- FLY Goodyear, formerly known as Buckeye Flight Experience, is a training center based at Lux Air Jet Center. They offer single-engine and multi-engine flight training for those looking to learn to fly for fun or those wanting to pursue a career in aviation.
- Lux Air Jet Center, is the Fixed Base Operator (FBO) for the Phoenix Goodyear Airport. They provide, fuel and support services for government, military and emergency medical service operators, also hosts many of the arrivals and departures for major sporting events in the Phoenix area.
- CTC Wings aviation academy started to use the airport as a training facility in 2014, in addition to its center in Hamilton, New Zealand.
- United Aviate Academy, opened in early 2022 is the main pilot training center for United Airlines.

== Operational statistics ==
Type of operation	Number
Single-engine aircraft based on field	183
Multi-engine aircraft based on field	6
Annual commercial operations	184
Jet aircraft based on field	19
Annual commuter operations	none
Helicopters based on field	1
Annual air taxi operations	3,324
Military aircraft based on field	6
Annual military operations	1,175
Gliders based on field	none
Annual GA local operations	45,189
Ultralights based on field	none
Annual GA itinerant operations	29,727

Through December 31, 2020.

== Gallery ==
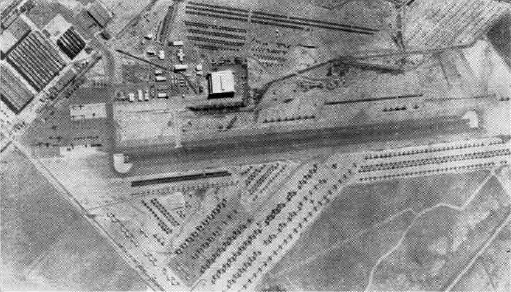
Aerial view in 1950

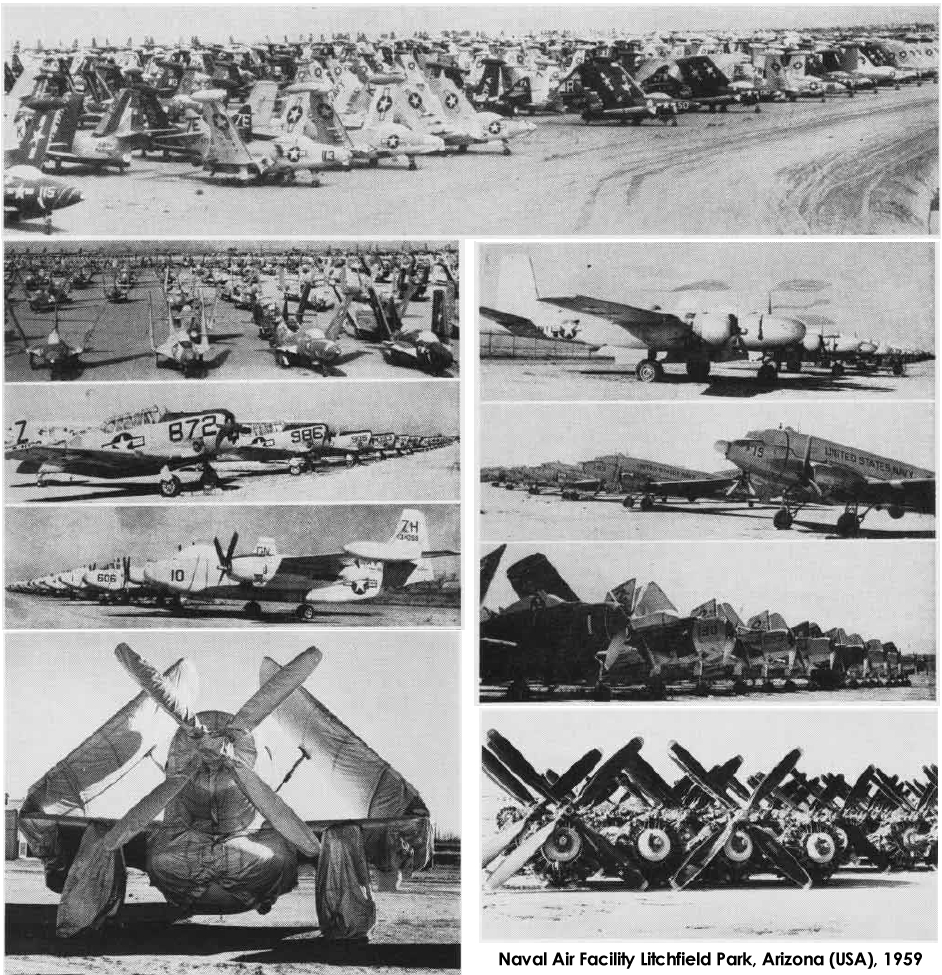
Different aircraft types stored in 1959

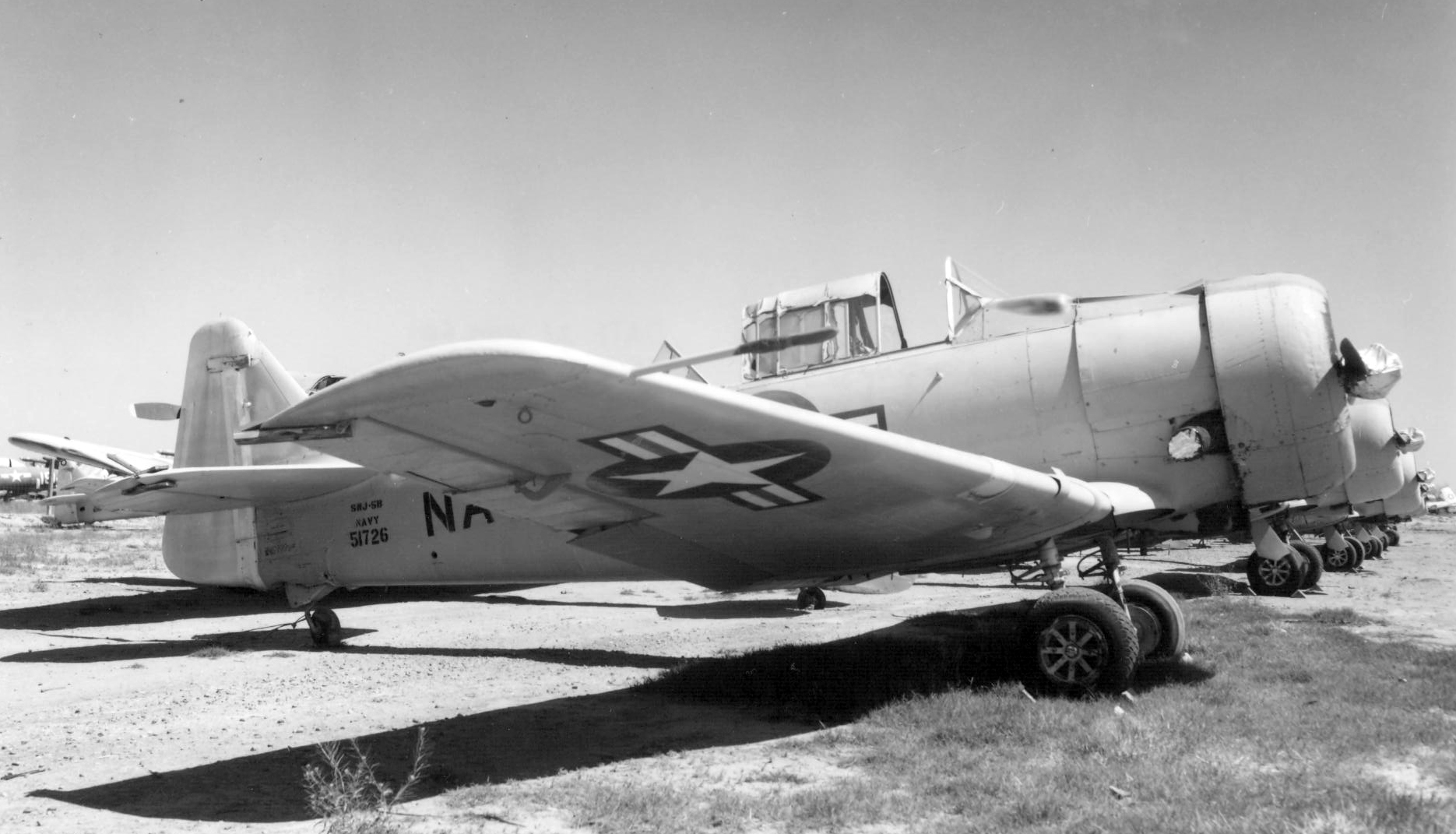
SNJs at Litchfield Park in 1960

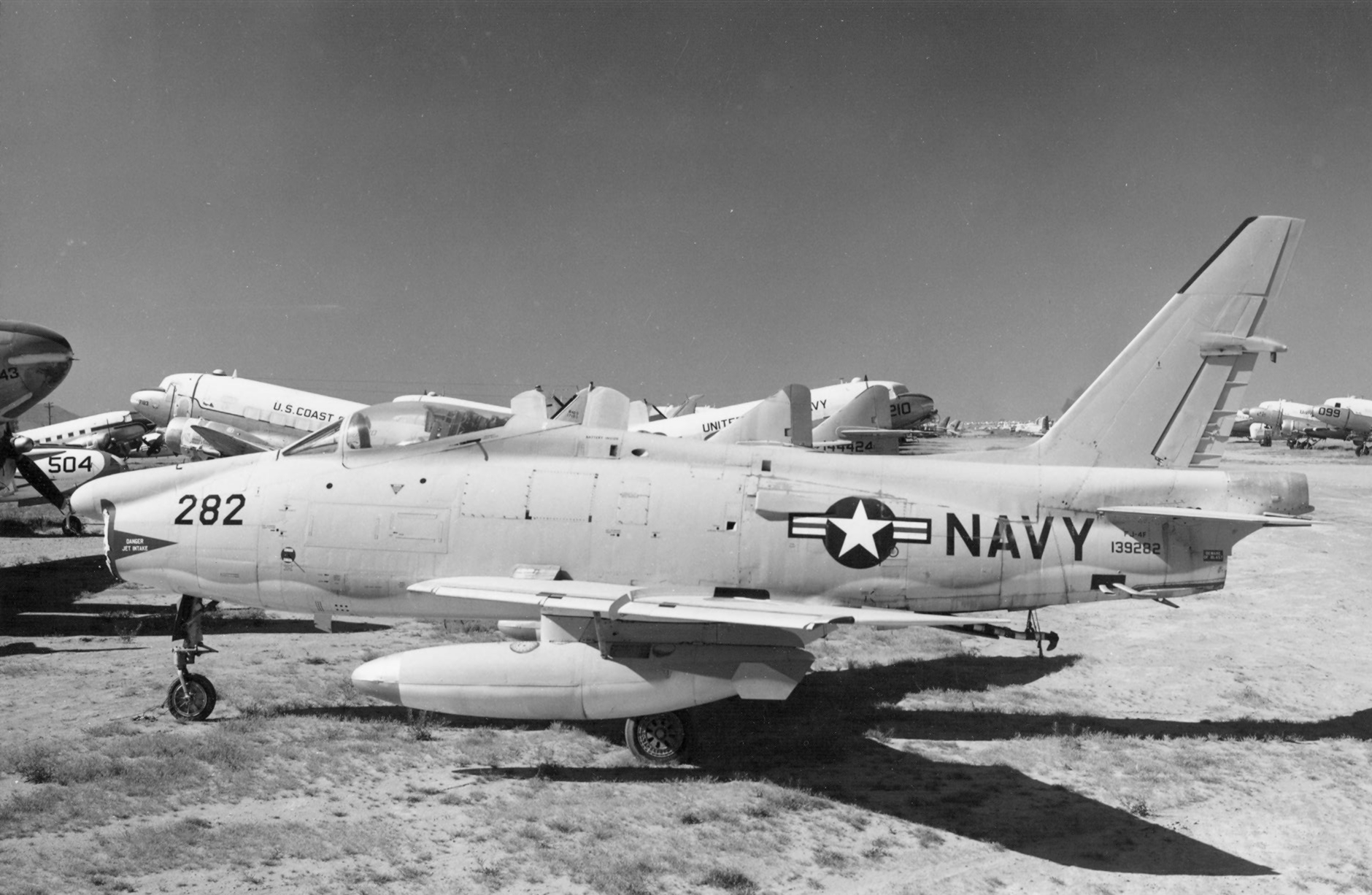
FJ-4F in 1960

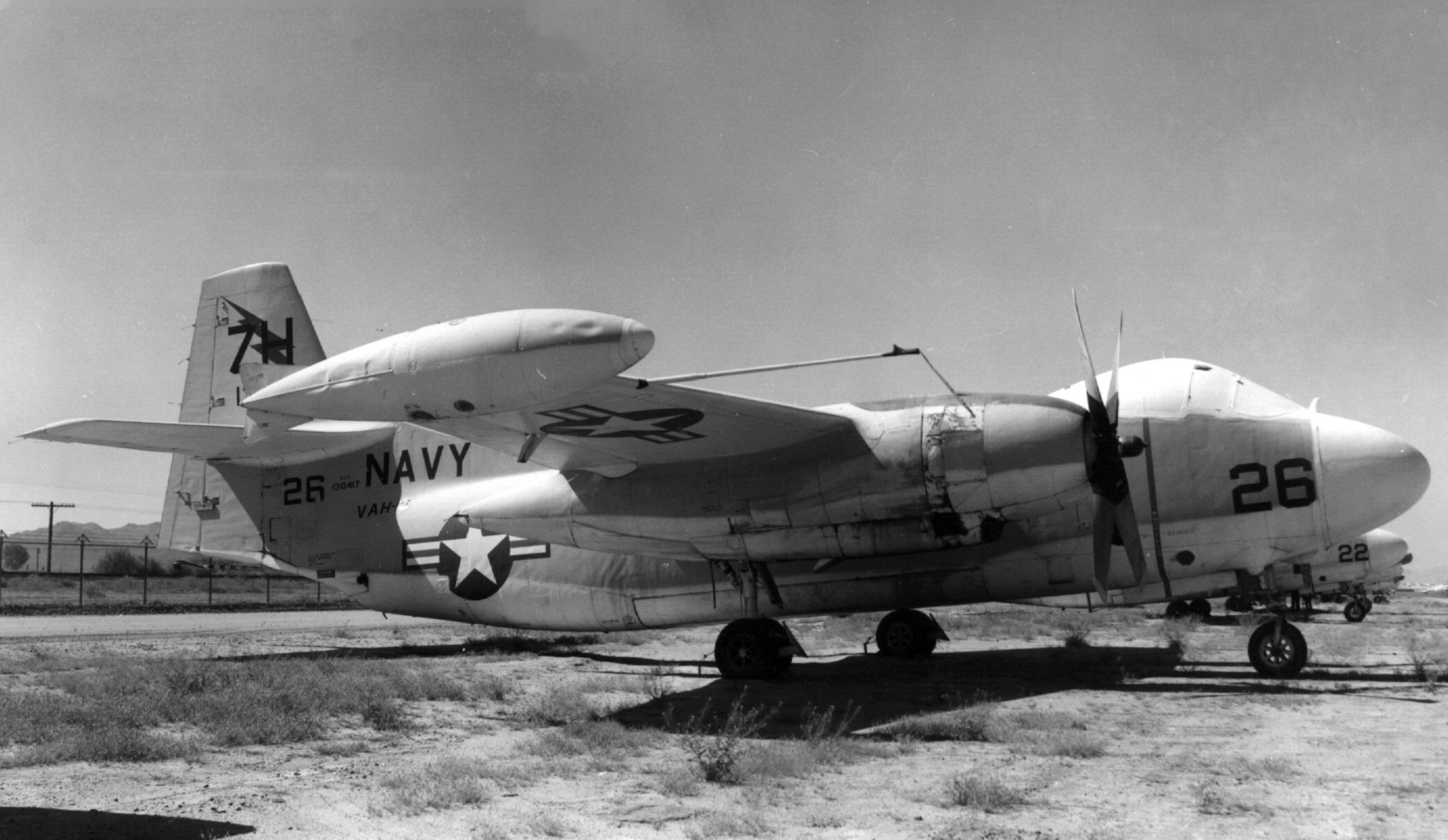
AJ-2 in the 1960s

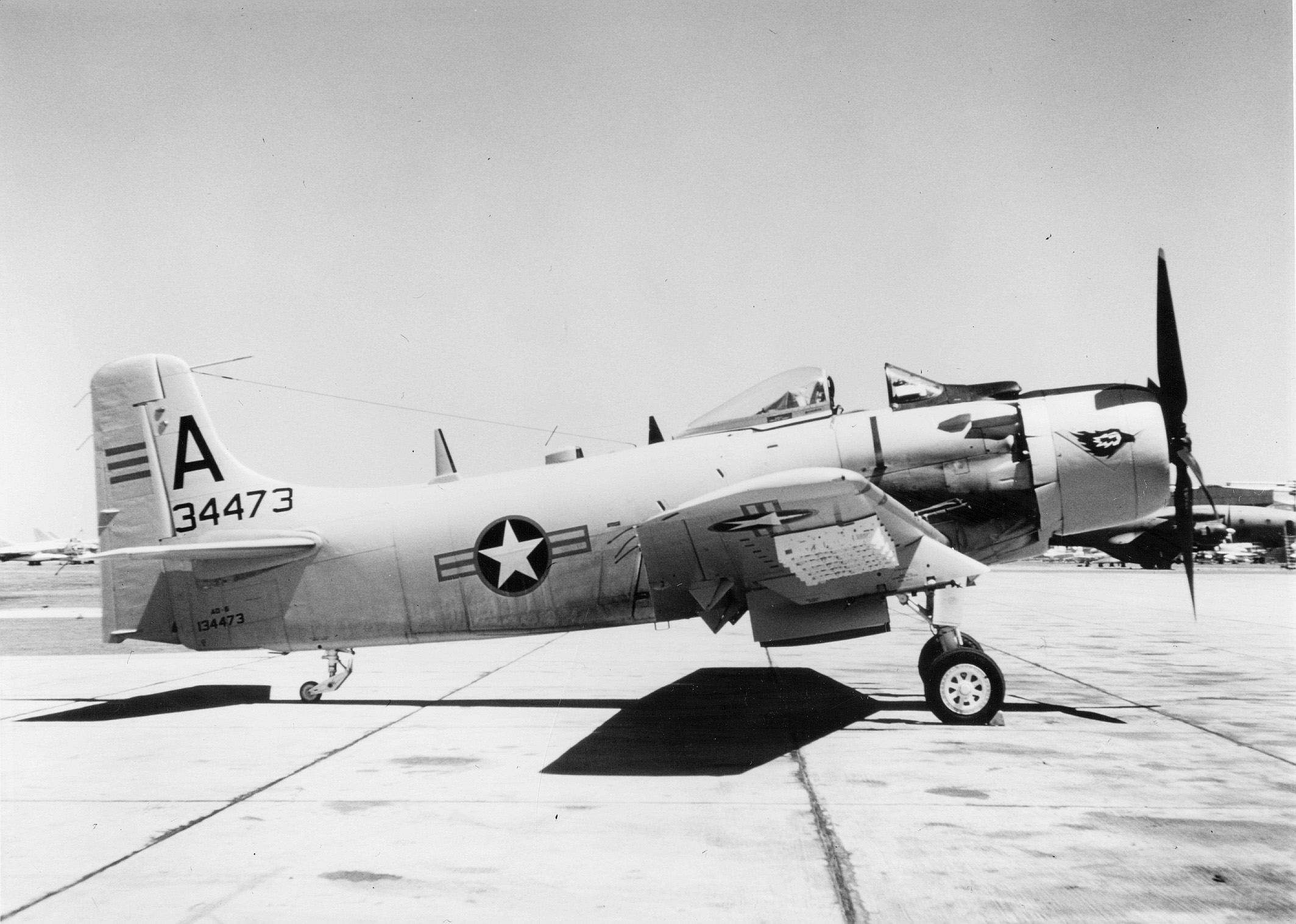
VNAF A-1H in 1961

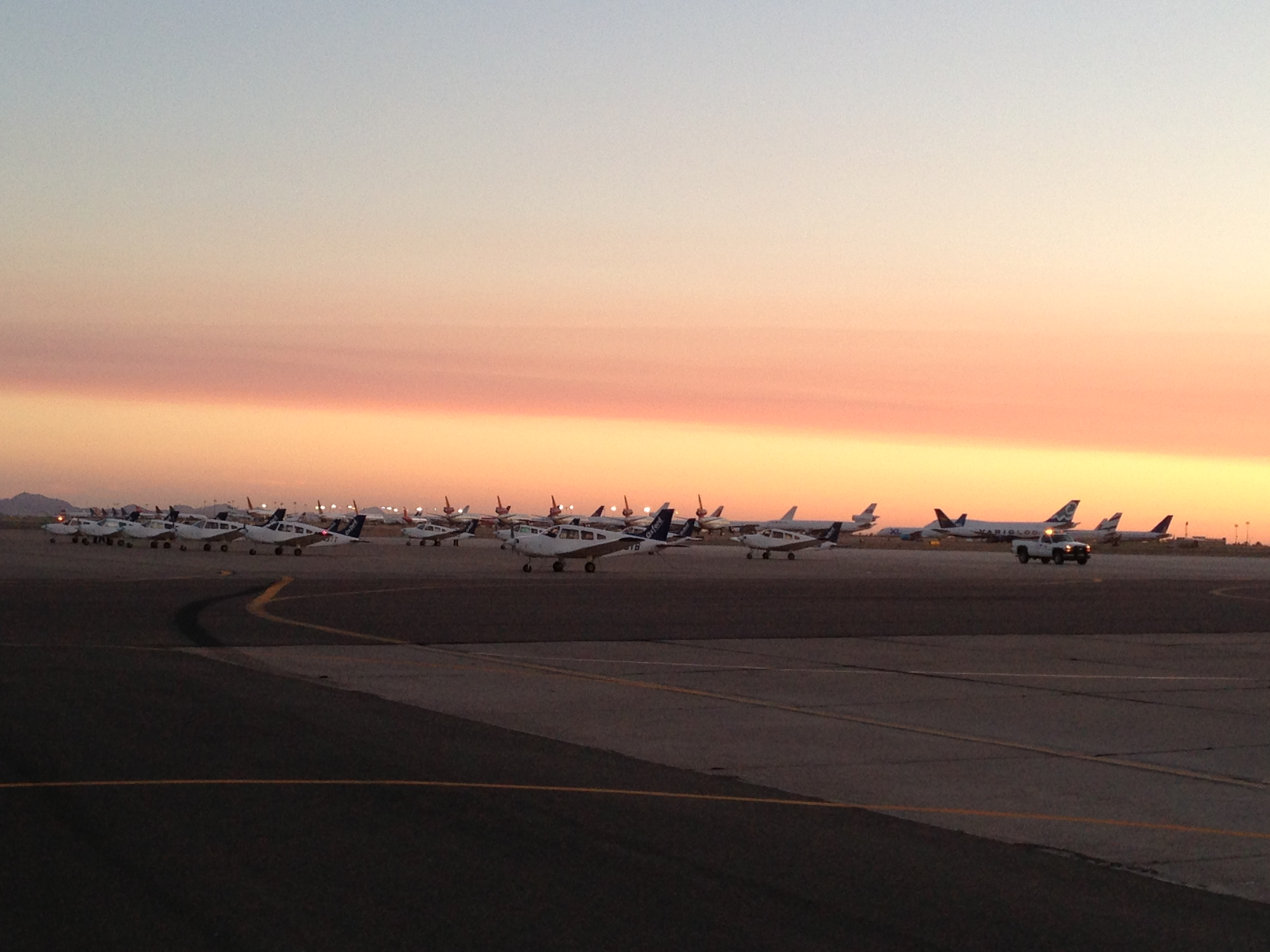
Seen from Lufthansa's former ramp looking north, the commercial parking and the OAA parking

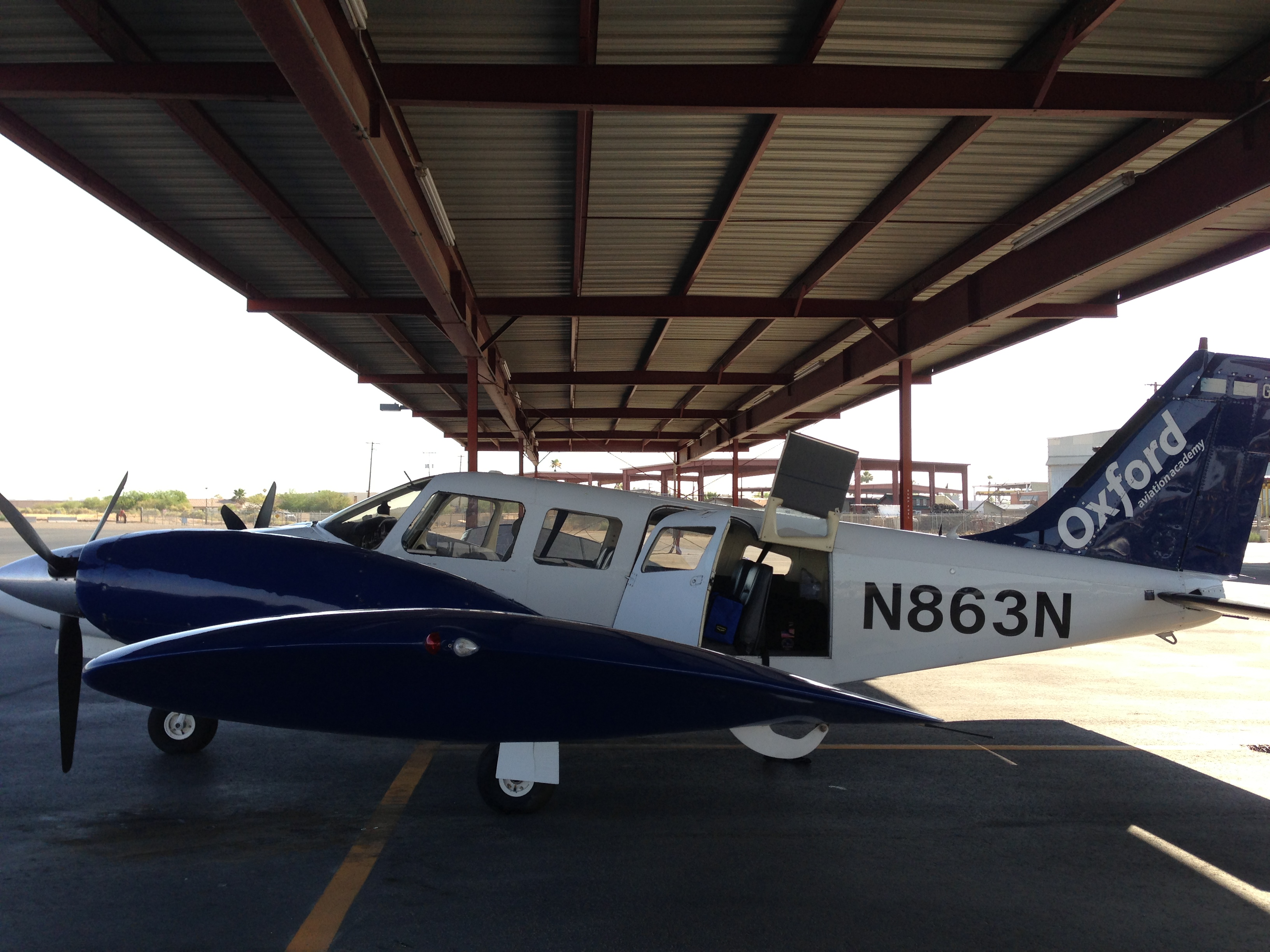
A PA34 of Oxford Aviation Academy at Seneca's ramp

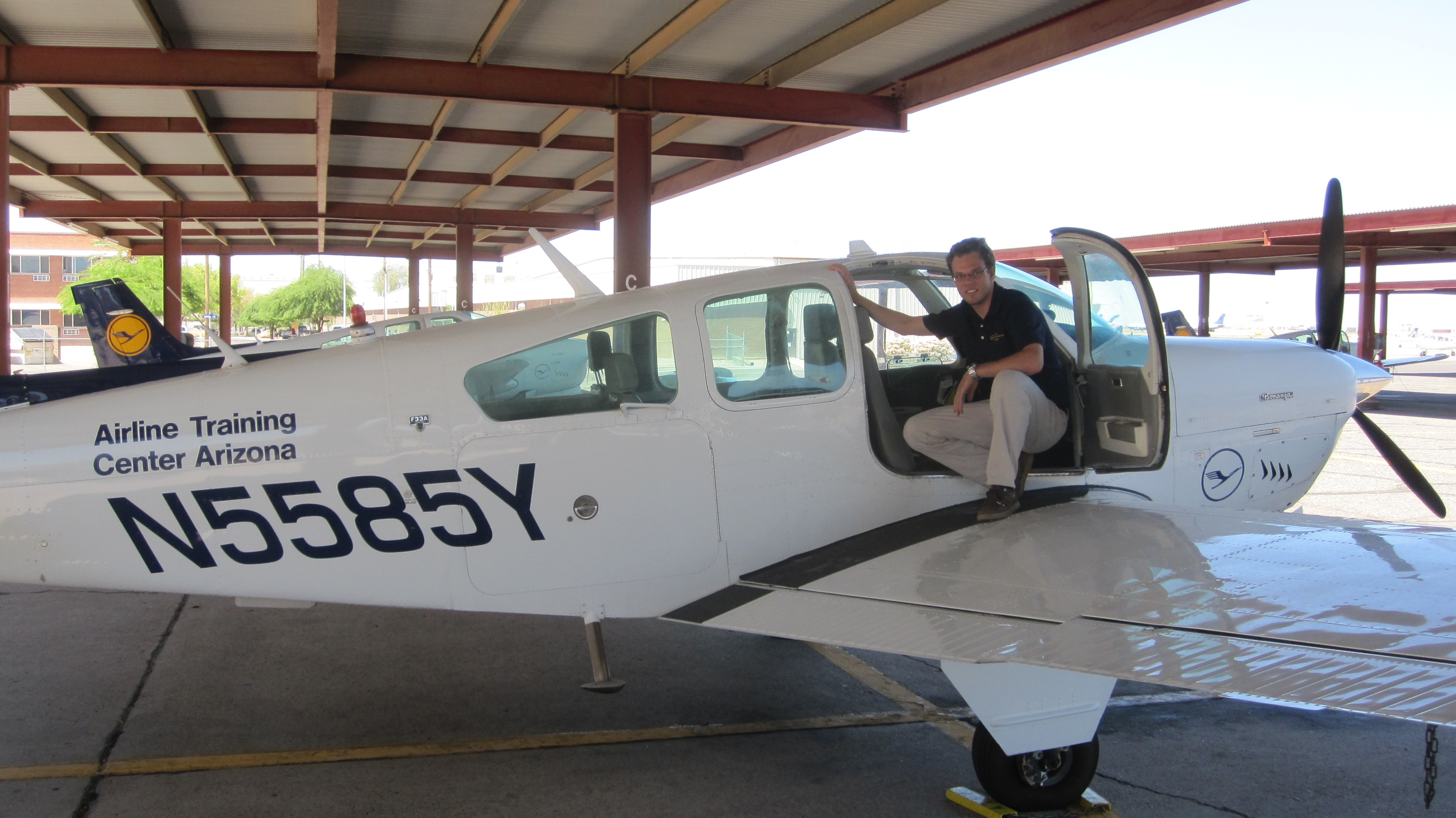
A former Lufthansa Flight Training Bonanza 33

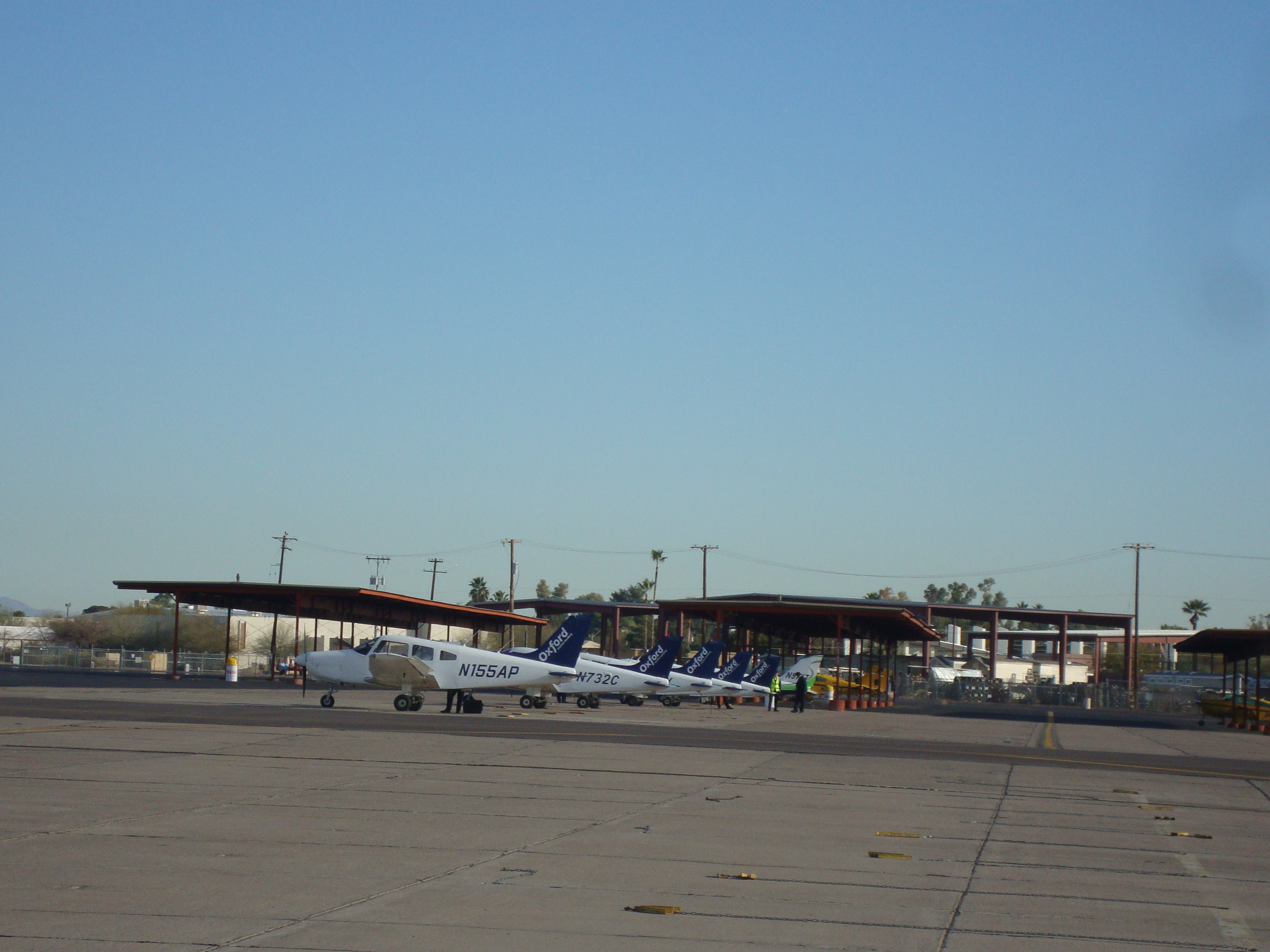
Oxford Aviation Academy's airplanes Piper PA-28 Warrior, as seen from the apron

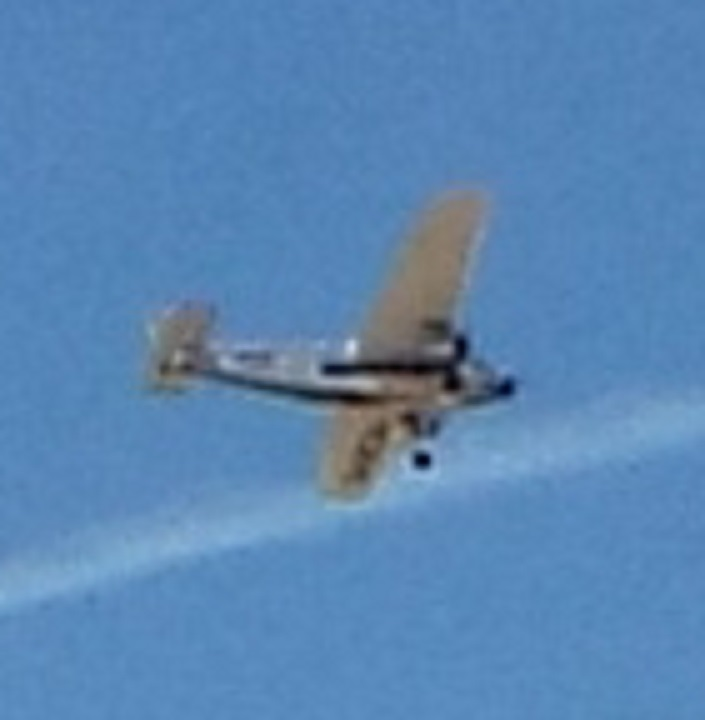
A Ford Trimotor landing at Phoenix Goodyear Airport during March 2017

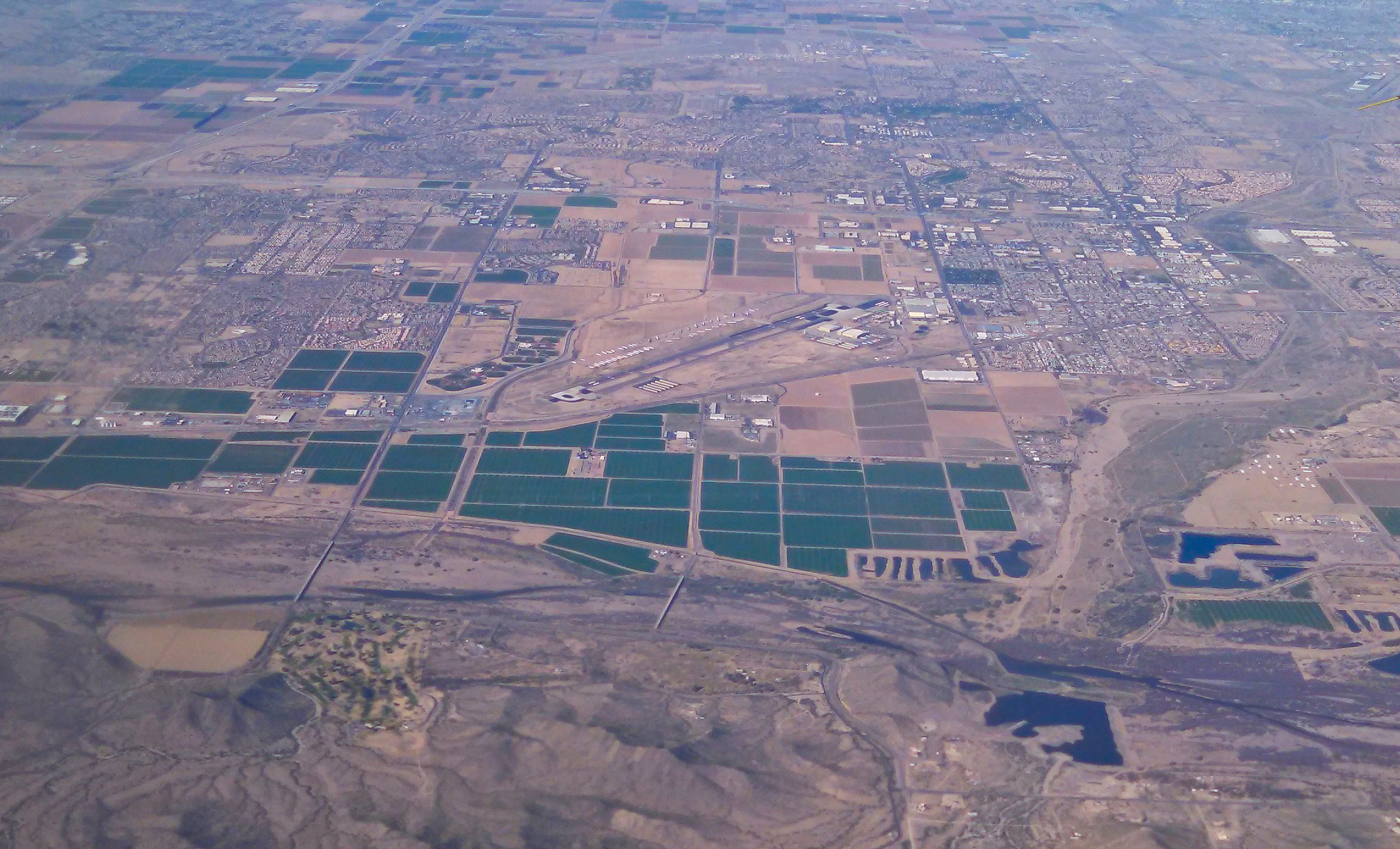
A recent view of Phoenix Goodyear Airport

== See also ==
- List of airports in Arizona
