= List of mayors of Goodyear, Arizona =

Goodyear, Arizona mayors

The following is a list of mayors of the city of Goodyear, Arizona, United States.

- William Killip Jr., ca.1946–1949
- George W. Leftwich, ca.1957–1959
- Cecil R. Palmateer, ca.1961–1963
- Charles Salem, ca.1979–1981
- William O. Arnold, ca.1989–2002
- James M. Cavanaugh, ca.2003–2010
- Georgia Lord, 2011–2021
- Joe Pizzillo, 2021–present

== See also ==
- Goodyear history
