= Mobile Elementary School District =

School district in Arizona, United States

Mobile Elementary School District 86

Location
- 42798 S 99th Ave; Goodyear, Arizona (Maricopa, Arizona mailing address) United States

Other information
- Website: www.mobileesd.org

Mobile Elementary School District 86 is a public school district based in Maricopa County, Arizona. It serves the Mobile area of Goodyear, Arizona.
