= CAE Oxford =

Ab initio flight training network

Coordinates: 51.8336°N 1.3144°W

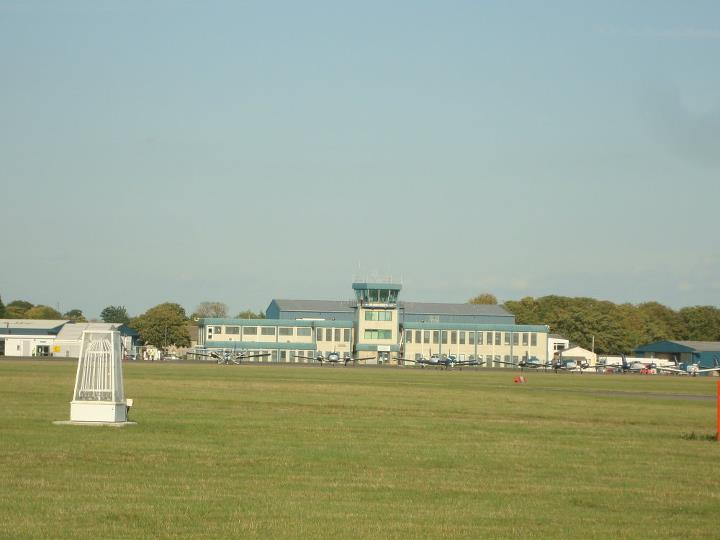
- Headquarters of Oxford Aviation Academy (Oxford Airport, Oxford, Great Britain)
- Established: 1961
- Location: CAE, London Oxford Airport, Kidlington, Oxford, OX5 1QX, UK
- Website: http://www.cae.com/becomeapilot

CAE Oxford, part of Canadian simulation and training provider CAE, is an ab initio flight training network. It provides integrated aviation training and resourcing services. Professional airline pilots have been trained at the Oxford Aviation Academy (OAA) flight school since 1961.

OAA operates 125 training aircraft, 64 flight simulators, and 10 training centers, delivering a portfolio of aviation training courses. OAA's 3 ab initio airline pilot training schools have trained more than 26,000 professional pilots over the past 50 years. OAA's seven training centers offer approved airline pilot, cabin crew and maintenance engineer training on a wide range of aircraft types including Boeing, Airbus, Bombardier, BAE Systems, and Embraer.

The Oxford Aviation Academy includes the former Oxford Aviation Training, a commercial pilot training school based at London Oxford Airport in the United Kingdom; Falcon Field in Arizona, United States; the former SAS Flight Academy; the former GECAT and the former BAE Systems Woodford, United Kingdom Training Centre, all of which are majority owned by STAR Capital Partners of London with a minority stake of less than 20% retained by GE Commercial Aviation Services.

The Airline Pilot Programme First Officer course is a full-time, integrated Civil Aviation Authority / European Union Aviation Safety Agency (CAA/EASA) course leading to the award of a 'Frozen' (becoming unfrozen when the candidate has completed 1,500 hours in a multi-pilot environment) airline transport pilot licence (ATPL).

== History ==
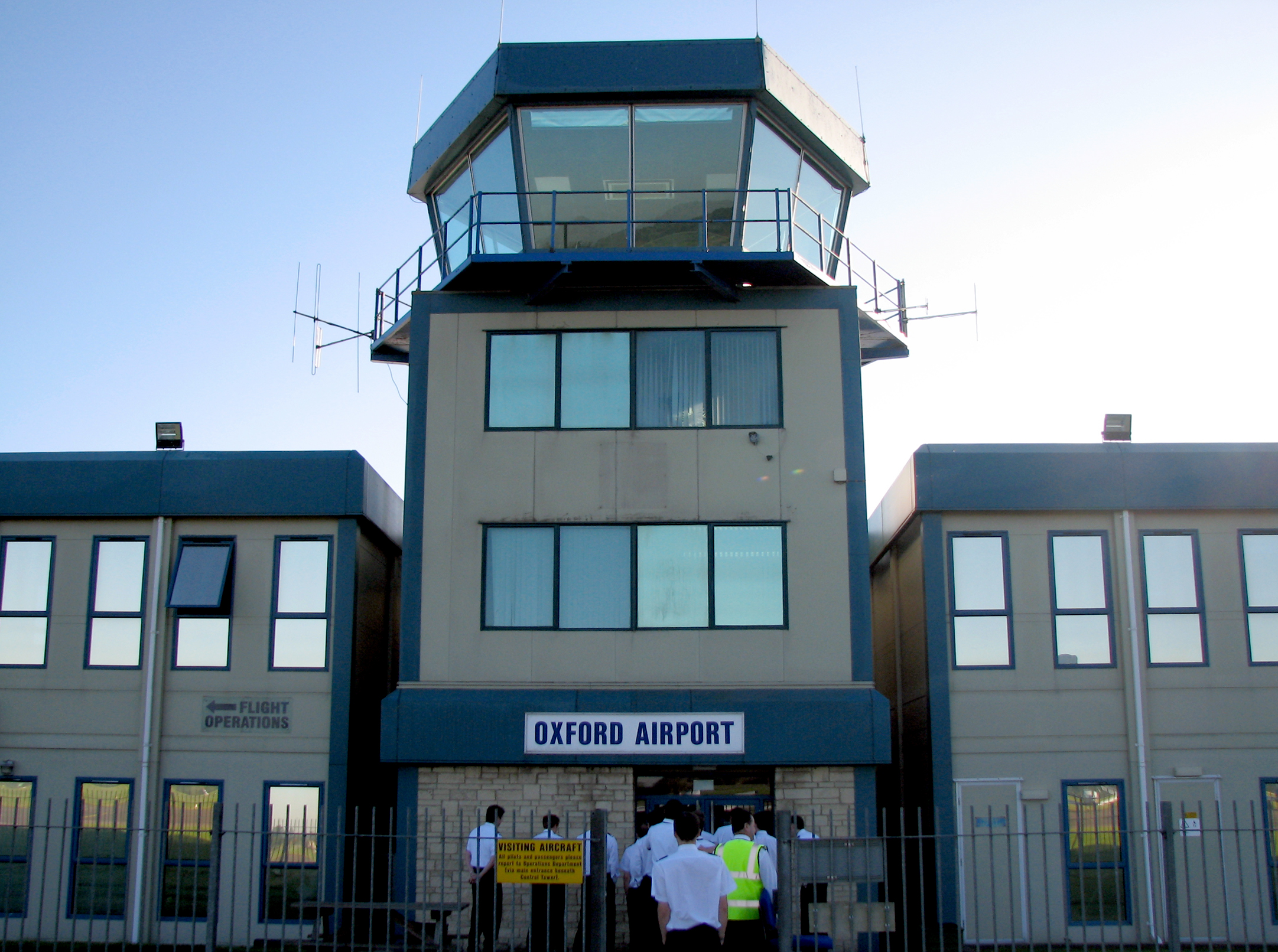
The air traffic control tower at Oxford Airport.

The Oxford Flying Club was opened by the mayor of Oxford in 1939. However, restrictions placed on civil aviation during the Second World War curtailed its activities, and the airfield operated as RAF Kidlington for the duration of hostilities. The club reopened in 1947, renamed to the Oxford Aeroplane Club. During the 1950s, it gradually increased its fleet and, by 1960, had become a flying school geared to the training of professional pilots.

In 1961, the flying school's parent company, Oxford Aviation, merged with the Pressed Steel Company to become British Executive Air Services Ltd. (BEAS). Dedicated ground school buildings and student residential accommodation were provided on site, and the first fully integrated Commercial Pilot's Licence (CPL) and instrument rating (IR) courses began in May 1962.

In 1963, the BEAS Flying Training Division was renamed Oxford Air Training School. Since then, over twenty thousand trained commercial pilots and aircraft engineers have graduated from the school. The school changed its name to Oxford Aviation Training (OAT) in the 1990s.

On June 19, 2007, OAT's parent company, BBA Aviation, now Signature Aviation, sold OAT to GCAT Flight Academy (formerly General Electric Commercial Aviation Training, part of GE Aviation and SAS Flight Academy, part of Scandinavian Airlines System) for $63 million (£32 million). The deal was backed by GCAT Flight Academy's majority shareholder, STAR Capital Partners, an independent venture capital fund.

In early February 2008, GCAT Flight Academy changed its registered name to Oxford Aviation Academy Ltd. OAT's branding and logo adorning the training center at Oxford and Goodyear Airports were replaced, with the new logo bearing the title 'Oxford Aviation Academy'. The insignia on the tailplanes of its Piper PA-28 Warrior and Piper PA-34 Seneca aircraft were also replaced with the new logo design. The new logo also appeared at the 8 locations formerly named GCAT Flight Academy, including those in Scandinavia and Hong Kong that GCAT purchased from SAS Flight Academy and the Woodford Training Centre, purchased from BAE Systems. These changes were a result of both GCAT Flight Academy and Oxford Aviation Training being re-branded as Oxford Aviation Academy.

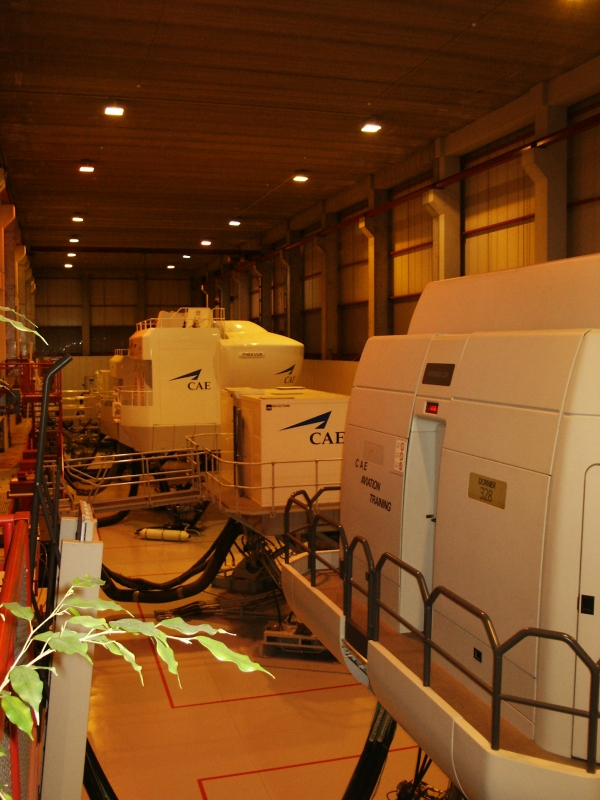
Full flight simulators at the CAE Oxford Aviation Academy center in Brussels

In 2008, OAA acquired General Flying Services, based in Moorabbin Airport, Moorabbin, Victoria, Australia.

In 2020, it was announced that CAE Oxford would close all ground training in early 2021 and move to a new location at CAE Gatwick, ending a legacy of over 50 years.

== Fleet ==
The fleet includes the following:

Aircraft	Qty
Piper PA-34 Seneca V	7
Diamond DA40	2

Simulator	Qty
FNPT 2 - Seneca V	2
Cessna 172	1

== Gallery ==
Aircraft and simulators
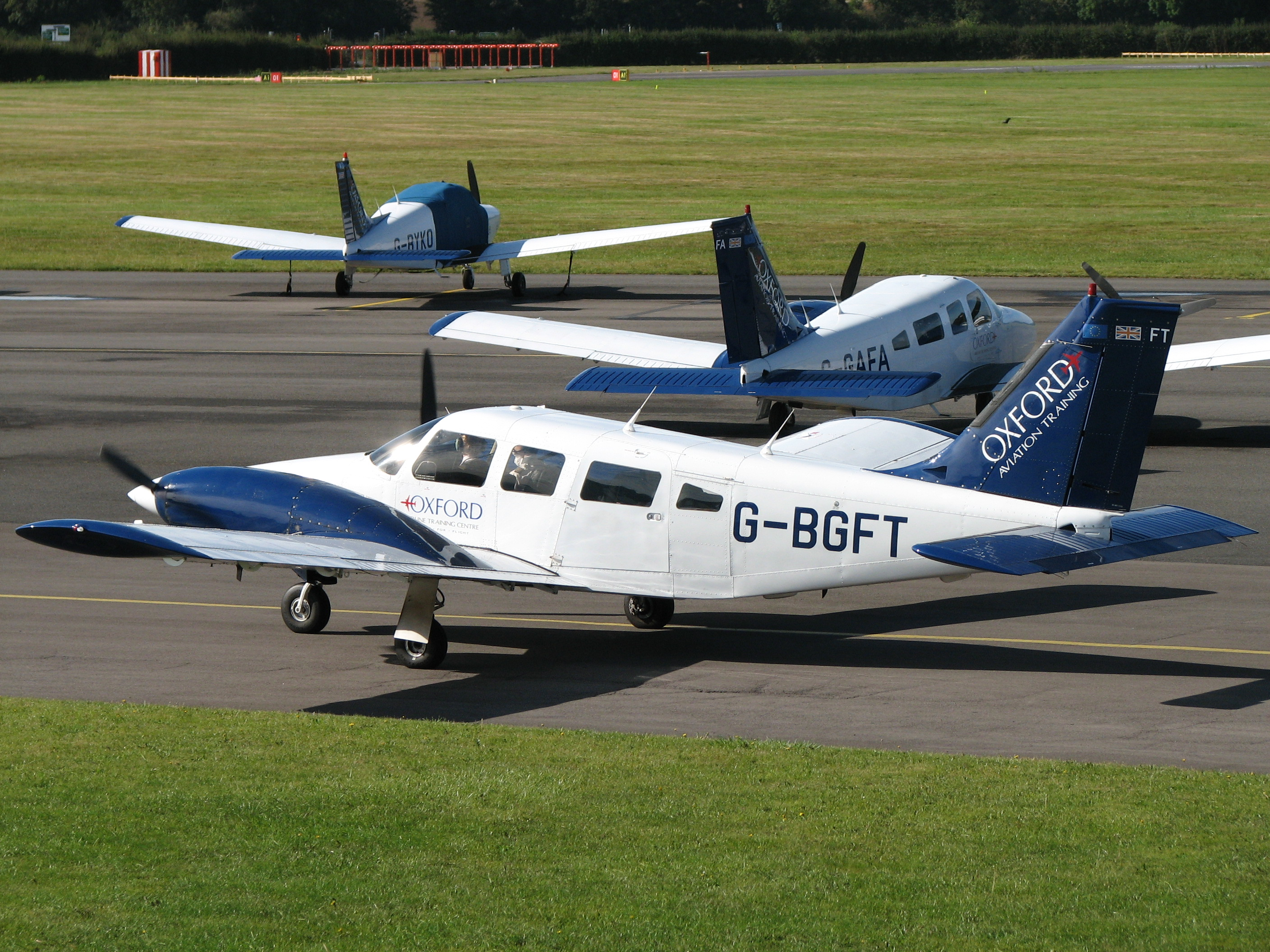
An OAA Piper PA-34 Seneca at Oxford Airport

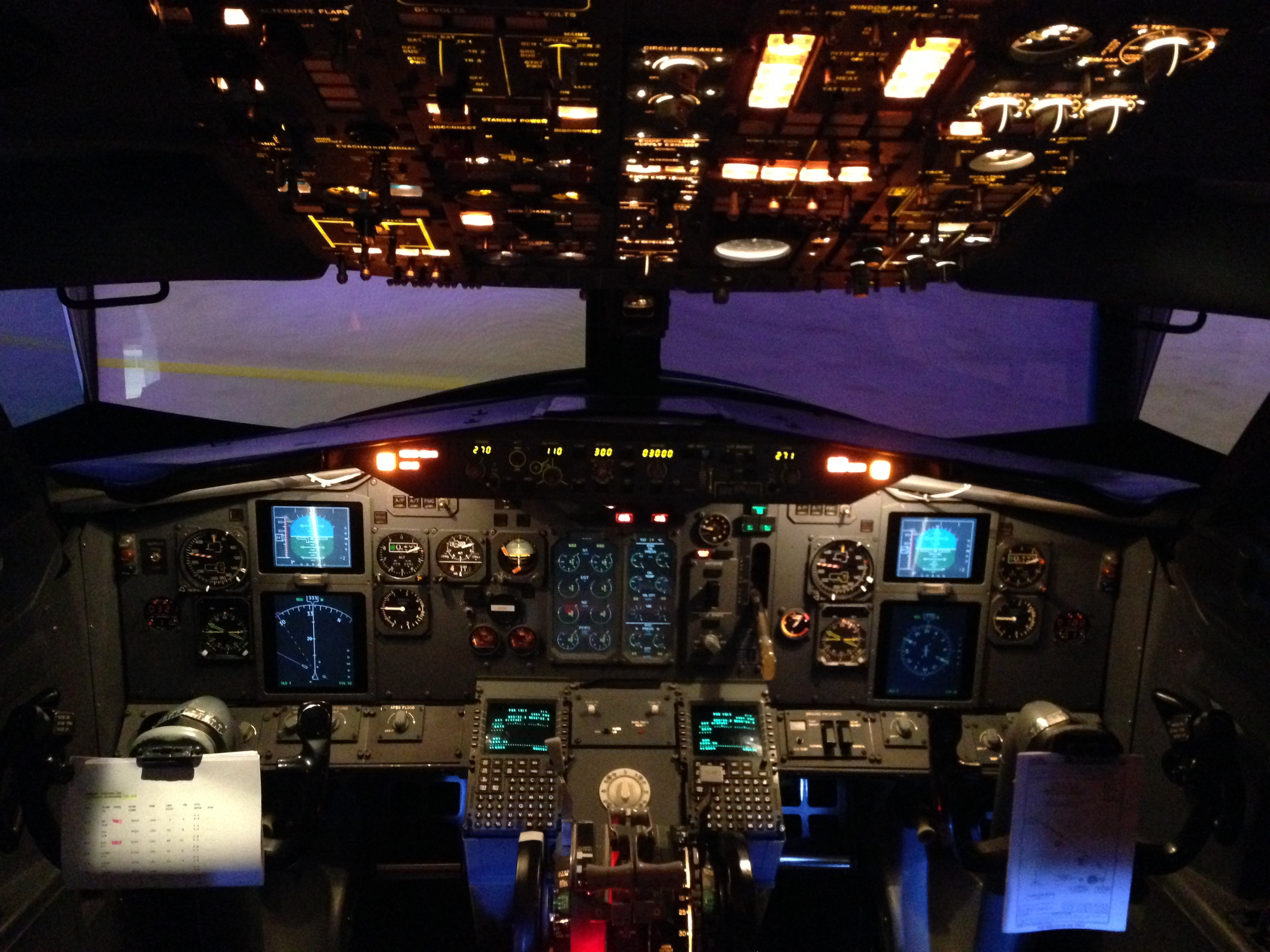
Boeing 737-400 simulators at Oxford, United Kingdom

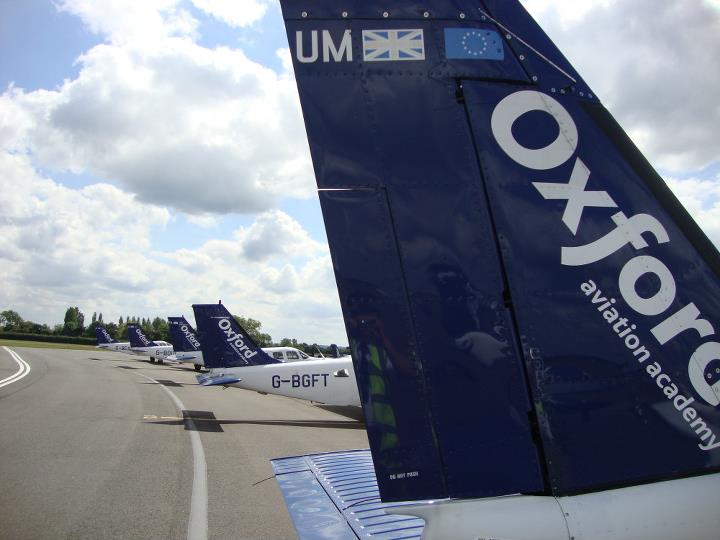
Piper PA-34 Senecas at London Oxford Airport

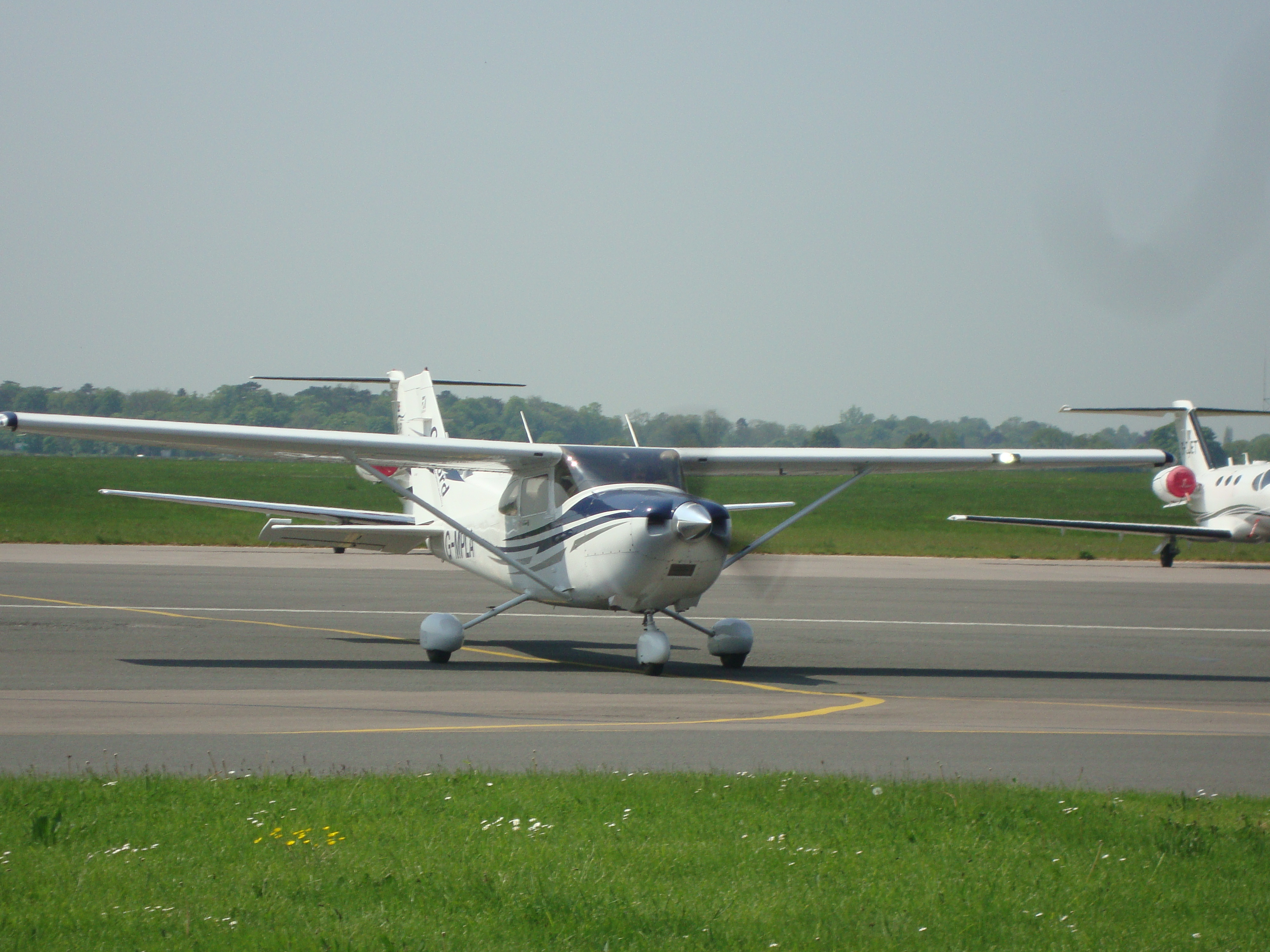
The new Cessna 182s of Oxford Aviation Academy at London Oxford Airport for easyJet Cadet Pilot Programme multi-crew pilot license training". (May 2012)

== See also ==
- Phoenix Goodyear Airport
- British Airways
- Pilot licensing and certification
- Buckinghamshire New University
