= Estrella, Arizona =

Master-planned community in Goodyear, Arizona

- Neighborhood
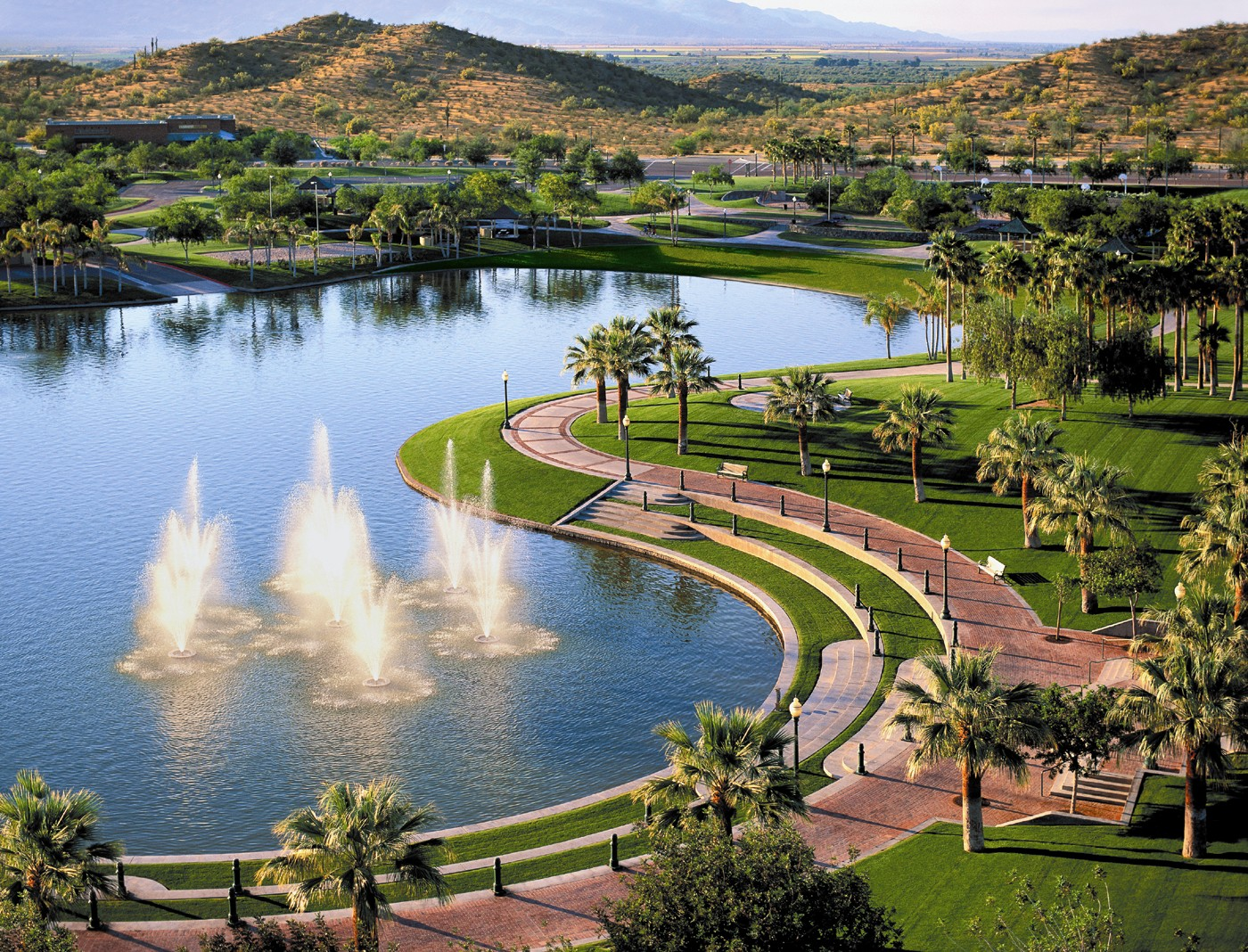
- North Lake in Estrella

- Location within Arizona Location within the United States
- Coordinates: 33°21′6.88″N 112°25′44.91″W
- Country: United States
- State: Arizona
- County: Maricopa
- City: Goodyear
- Opened: 1988

Area
  - Total: 31.36 sq mi (81.23 km^{2})
  - Land: 31.25 sq mi (80.94 km^{2})
  - Water: 0.11 sq mi (0.29 km^{2})
- Elevation: 1,015.0–1,760.0 ft (309.37–536.45 m)

Population
  - Estimate (2026): 22,000
- Time zone: UTC-7
- Postal code: 85338
- Area code: 623
- Website: estrella.com

Estrella is a 20,000-acre (8,100 ha) master-planned community in Goodyear, Maricopa County, Arizona, United States.

Estrella is located in the foothills of the Sierra Estrella Mountains, in the Sonoran Desert. As of 2026, over 8,000 homes have been built, bringing the population to approximately 22,000 people.

== History ==
Estrella was created by Charles Keating, who purchased the land for approximately $100 million, and was later indicted on federal criminal charges alleging the development "was the vehicle for phony land transactions that hid from regulators and investors the fact that Keating's companies were headed for bankruptcy". Keating envisioned Estrella as "a safe, clean, pornography-free community", and the original plans included deed restrictions forbidding residents from watching pornography or having abortions, and "the right to strip businesses and homes of art and publications he and his board saw as smut".

Development began in the 1980s, and Estrella opened in 1988.

In 2021, a partnership of developers purchased 18,000 acres (7,300 ha) of land in Estrella for $212.5 million, which included "current and future homesites, multifamily and commercial parcels, and developer-owned amenities". The new owners are entitled to build another 8,000 to 10,000 homes.

== Neighborhoods ==
Neighborhoods in the master-planned community include:

- Estrella Mountain Ranch
- Montecito
- CantaMia – 55+ homes
- Lucero at Estrella
- Acacia Foothills
- The Trails at Estrella

== Parks and recreation ==
Parks and recreation include 65 miles (105 km) of hiking trails, 72 acres (29 ha) of lakes and parks, the Estrella Lakeside Amphitheater, the Golf Club of Estrella, a community welcome center, a waterpark, and the Yacht Club of Estrella.
