= Lufthansa Aviation Training =

Pilot training division of Lufthansa

Lufthansa Aviation Training

Lufthansa Aviation Training GmbH is the flight academy subsidiary of Lufthansa that trains Lufthansa Group pilots as well as cabin crew and technical staff. The company has about 500 employees and has been in business for around 50 years.

== Operations ==
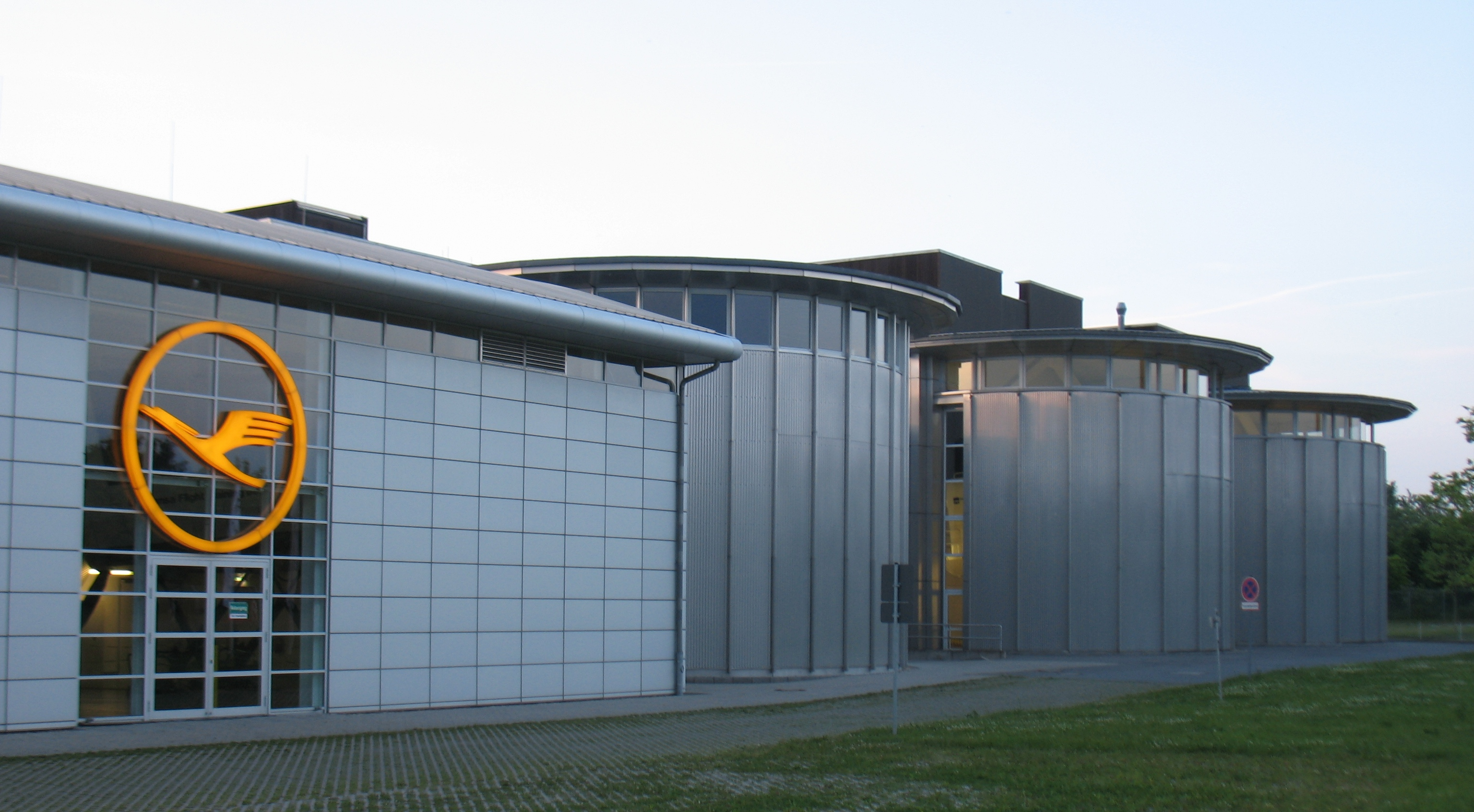
Lufthansa Aviation Training Center in Berlin

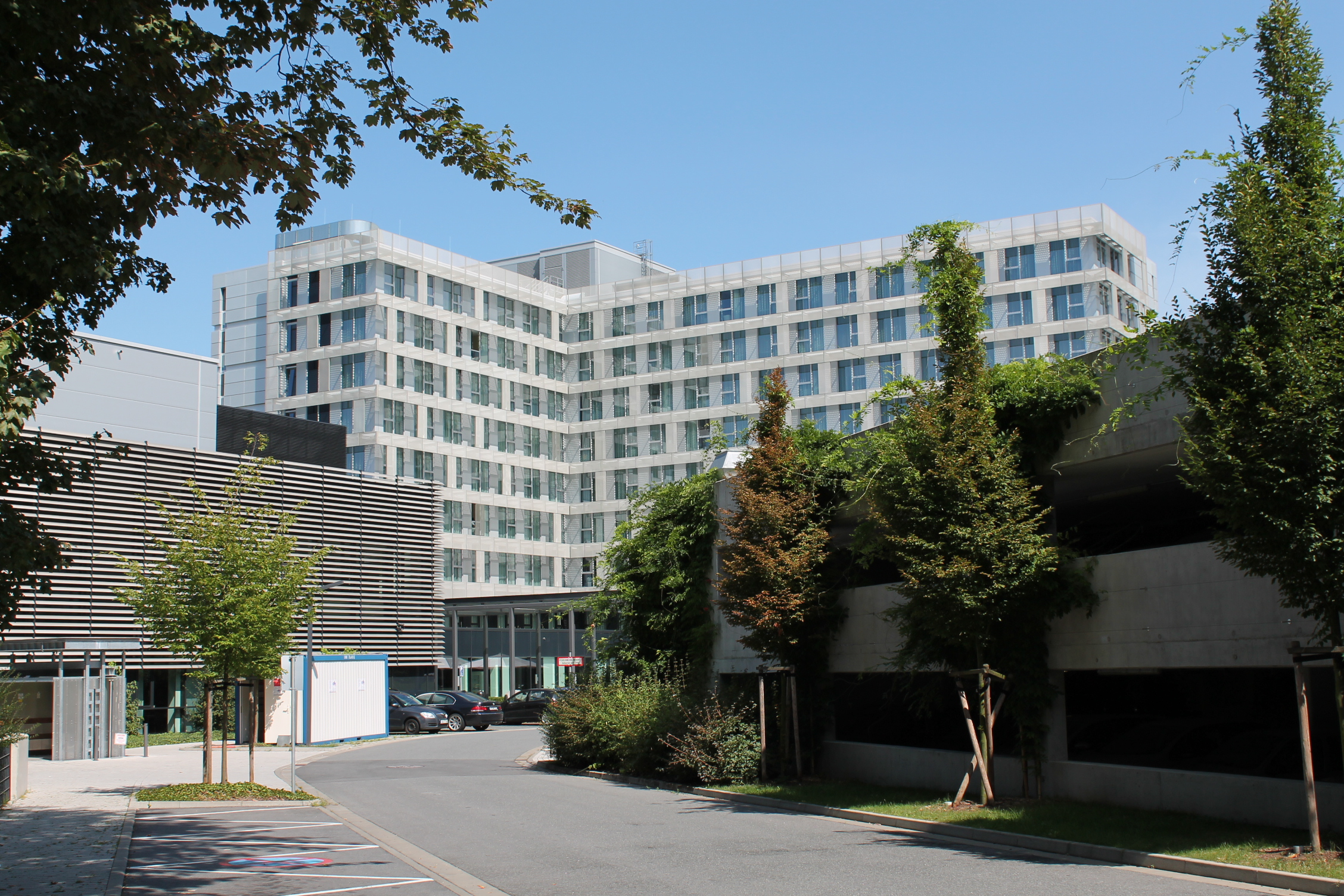
Lufthansa Aviation Training and Conference Center near Frankfurt

=== Structure ===
Lufthansa Aviation Training owns 9 subsidiaries: Lufthansa Aviation Training Crew Academy GmbH, Lufthansa Aviation Training Berlin GmbH, Lufthansa Aviation Training Operations Germany GmbH, Lufthansa Aviation Training Germany GmbH, Lufthansa Aviation Training Austria GmbH, Lufthansa Aviation Training USA Inc., Lufthansa Aviation Training Pilot Academy GmbH and Aviation Quality Services (AQS).

=== Locations ===
As of 2021, Lufthansa Aviation Training maintains two brands with the following locations:

- Lufthansa Aviation Training – Berlin, Essen, Frankfurt am Main, Cologne, Munich, Vienna and Zürich
- European Flight Academy – Bremen, Grenchen, Phoenix (Arizona), Rostock and Zürich

In February 2021, Lufthansa Aviation Training announced they would move all German practical training from Bremen Airport to Rostock Airport.

=== Lufthansa Aviation Training USA ===
The Aviation Training Center Arizona is a facility in Goodyear, Arizona, where future Lufthansa pilots conduct flight training with small aircraft. It is operated by the Lufthansa subsidiary Lufthansa Aviation Training. The base contains a building where the students live in their own apartments.

=== Aviation Quality Services GmbH ===
Aviation Quality Services (AQS) is a subsidiary of Lufthansa Flight Training, located in Frankfurt, Germany. The company is an IATA accredited IOSA Audit Organization and an IATA accredited Endorsed Training Organization. AQS conducts audits, and auditor, quality, and Safety Management Systems training. In 2003, AQS was the first company to be accredited by IATA as an IOSA Audit Organization and Endorsed Training Organization. Two years later, the company became the world's leading IOSA Audit Organization.

== Fleet ==
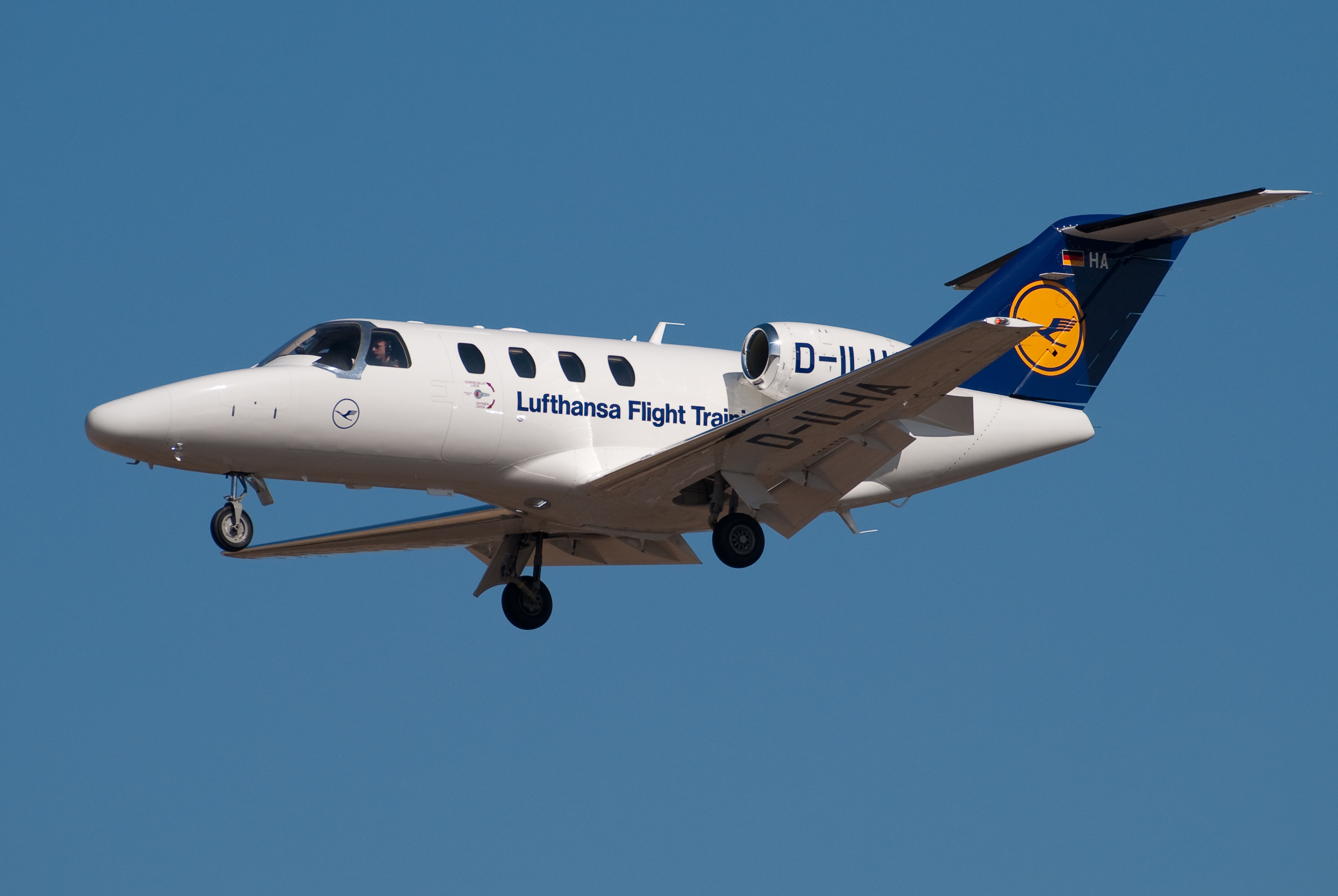
Lufthansa Aviation Training Cessna 525 Citation CJ1+

Lufthansa Aviation Training uses the following aircraft types for training purposes:

- Beechcraft Bonanza
- Cessna 525 Citation CJ1+
- Cirrus SR20
- Diamond DA40
- Diamond DA42
- Grob G 120
- Piper PA-42 Cheyenne
- Piper PA-44 Seminole
- Saab 91B Safir

== See also ==
- École de l'Air
- Empire Central Flying School
- Integrated pilot training
