= Integrated pilot training =

Integrated pilot training is one way aircraft pilots may train for a Commercial Pilot Licence. Pilots will normally enter into an ab-initio scheme with a Flight Training Organisation (FTO) where they may have as little as zero hours flight experience, up to or above the minimum requirements of the law of that country or ICAO state.

Alternatives include modular training, and the Multi-pilot licence (MPL).

== History ==
Integrated pilot training was first put to the United Kingdom Civil Aviation Authority by Oxford Aviation Training in 1962.

== List of notable providers ==
=== Germany ===
- Lufthansa Flight Training

=== United Kingdom ===
- Oxford Aviation Academy
