= Goodyear, Arizona =

City in Arizona, United States

- City
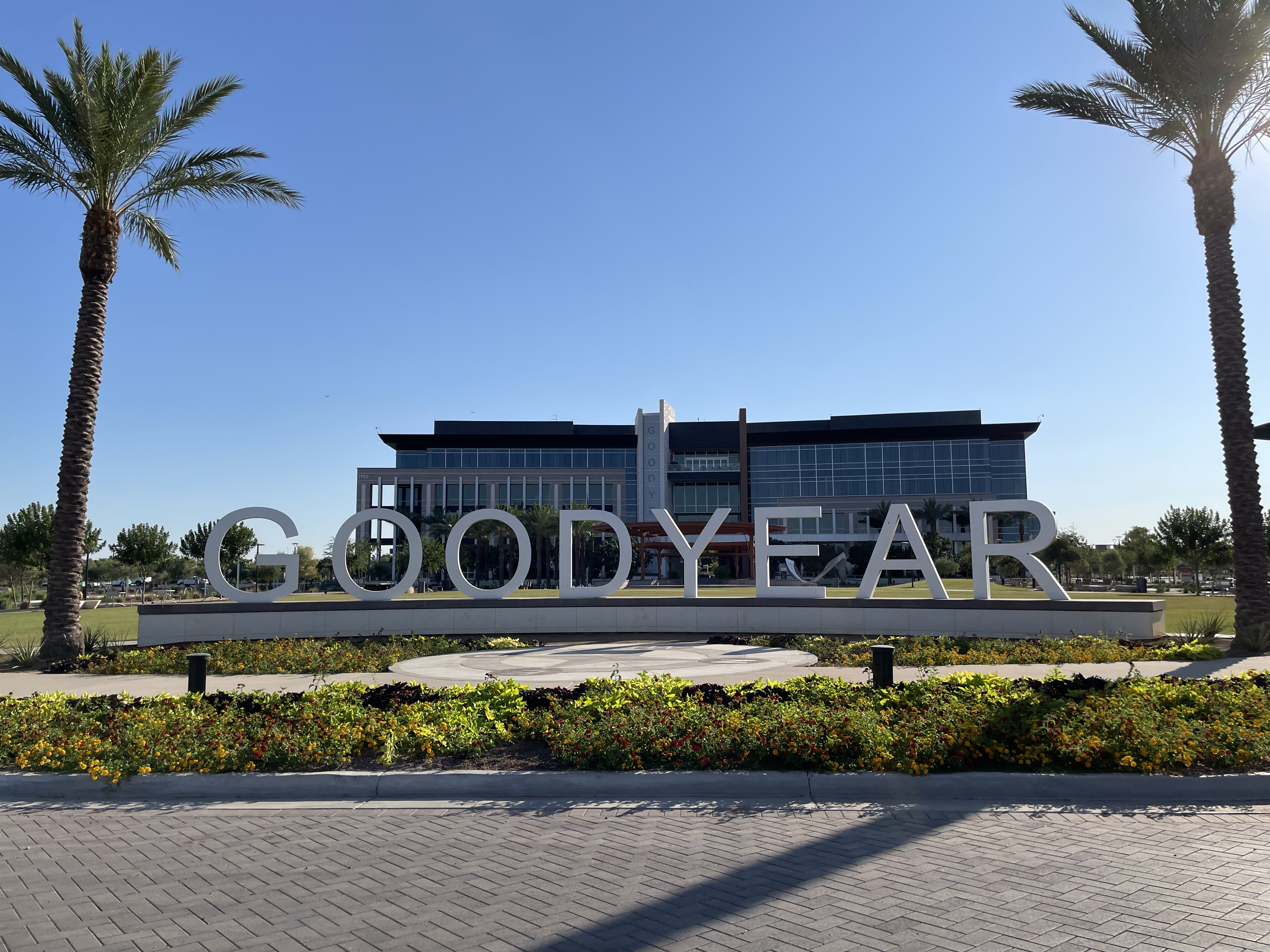
- Goodyear City Hall building at 1900 N. Civic Square.

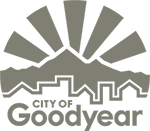
- Flag Seal

- Location of Goodyear, Arizona

- Location within Arizona Location within the United States
- Coordinates: 33.254031°N 112.366472°W
- Country: United States
- State: Arizona
- County: Maricopa
- Founded: 1917
- Incorporated: November 19, 1946

Government
  - Type: Council–manager
  - Mayor: Joe Pizzillo
  - Assistant mayor: Janet Hidalgo
  - Vice mayor: Wally Campbell
  - City Council: Lorena Chacon; Amber Costello; Brannon Hampton; Laura Kaino; Vicki Gillis; Benita Beckles; Trey Terry

Area
  - City: 191.334 sq mi (495.553 km^{2})
  - Land: 191.305 sq mi (495.477 km^{2})
  - Water: 0.029 sq mi (0.075 km^{2}) 0.02%
- Elevation: 968 ft (295 m)

Population (2020)
  - City: 95,294
  - Estimate (2024): 118,186
  - Density: 617.7/sq mi (238.49/km^{2})
  - Urban: 419,946
  - Metro: 5,186,958
- Time zone: UTC–7 (Mountain (MST) (no DST))
- ZIP Codes: 85338, 85395
- Area code(s): 602, 480, and 623
- FIPS code: 04-28380
- GNIS feature ID: 0005172
- Website: goodyearaz.gov

Goodyear is a city in Maricopa County, Arizona, United States. The population was 95,294 at the 2020 census, and was estimated to be 118,186 in 2024.

The city is home to the Goodyear Ballpark, where the Cleveland Guardians and Cincinnati Reds of Major League Baseball hold spring training.

In 2008, Goodyear won the All-America City Award, sponsored by the National Civic League. The city is named after the Goodyear Tire and Rubber Company. The company cultivated extensive farmland here to grow cotton for use in its tires.

== History ==
Goodyear was established in 1917 with the purchase of 16,000 acres (65 km^{2}) of land by the Goodyear Tire and Rubber Company to cultivate cotton for vehicle tire cords. World War II was important to Goodyear in the 1940s as the current Phoenix Goodyear Airport was built, but after the war, the economy suffered. Goodyear became a town on November 19, 1946. At the time, it had 151 homes and 250 apartments, a grocery store, a barber shop, beauty shop and a gas station.

=== World War II ===
Luke Field Auxiliary #6 (Goodyear Field) was built by the United States Army Air Forces in 1943. It served as a satellite airfield for Luke Army Air Field (AAF). According to the History of Luke AFB, this airfield boasted the most facilities. It had separate buildings for crew chiefs, operations, supply, barracks, pit latrine, crash truck shed, generator shed and a control tower. Luke AF Auxiliary #6 ceased operations by 1971.

The property, which is in a state of complete abandonment, is owned by the State of Arizona, which has worked with developers on proposals for use.

=== Modern history ===
In January 1965, the Phoenix Trotting Park, a harness racing track, opened. The current Interstate 10 passes north of the site. As the region lacked major roads from Phoenix to Goodyear, there was not enough business and the track closed two years later. The park was demolished in 2017.

The town became a city in 1985. In 1987, the remaining 10,000 acres (40 km^{2}) of the original farmland was sold to Suncor Development, a subsidiary of AZP (later renamed Pinnacle West Capital), for future development. The Phoenix Goodyear Airport received its current name in 1986.

==== Housing and growth ====
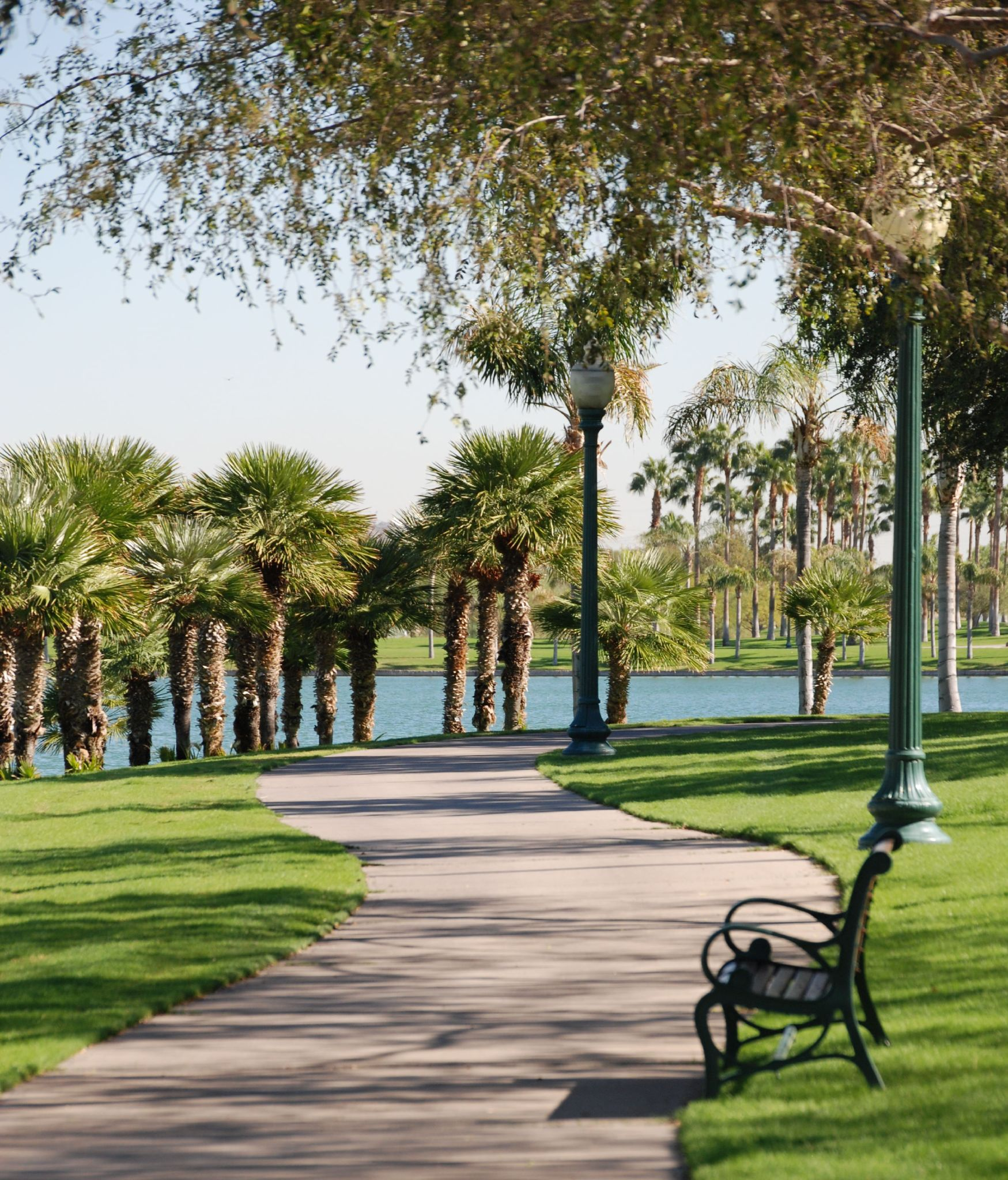
South Lake Park in Estrella, on the southern end of Goodyear

Although Goodyear was founded in 1917, the majority of construction and population growth happened after 1990. 22 communities that are completed and under construction have a total area of approximately 20,000 acres (31 mi^{2}). These communities, along with another 21 communities for future suburban development, will contain almost 200,000 homes, with only 25,000 built.

Goodyear was affected by the 2000s American housing bubble, reducing home values. Since then, the housing market has rebounded considerably. According to Opendoor, ZIP code 85338 in Goodyear was the fifth most popular place in the Phoenix metro area to buy a home, based on home sales. There are also a variety of home options in 2019 to accommodate families, those who are single, and seniors. As the population in Goodyear grows faster than ever, home builders and community developers are working quickly to keep up with the demand.

Estrella is the largest community in Goodyear, at 20,000 acres (31 mi^{2}). The master-planned community is home to about 10,000 residents. Palm Valley, located north of Interstate 10, is 9,000 acres (14 mi^{2}), with variously sized homes. PebbleCreek is a community for active adult living, with 54 holes of championship golf, fitness centers, and restaurants.

From the 1990s through the 2010s, residential development has stimulated the growth of Goodyear as a suburb of Phoenix. Goodyear's population is projected to be 358,000 by 2035.

== Geography ==
Goodyear is approximately 17 miles (27 km) west of downtown Phoenix. Nearby cities include Avondale, Litchfield Park, Tolleson and Buckeye. From the original town center, the Goodyear city limits extend north 5 miles (8 km) to a border with Glendale and south-southeast into the Rainbow Valley 30 miles (48 km) to an area south of Arizona State Route 238.

According to the United States Census Bureau, the city has a total area of 191.334 square miles (495.55 km^{2}), of which 191.305 square miles (495.48 km^{2}) is land and 0.029 square miles (0.08 km^{2}) (0.02%) is water. The Gila River passes through the city. The largest master-planned community is Estrella, south of the Gila River, located near the Estrella Mountains.

The Estrella Mountain Regional Park covers almost 20,000 acres (81 km^{2}), most of which is still desert. It contains eight trails over 30 mi (48 km) in combined length, two baseball fields, and a 9.5-mile (15.3 km) track.

=== Climate ===
Goodyear has a hot desert climate (Köppen: BWh) due to its location in the Sonoran Desert. The city receives somewhere around ten inches of rain annually. The city has more than 300 sunny days per year.

Winters are sunny with mild temperatures—nighttime lows averaging between 40 and 50 °F (4 and 10 °C) and daytime highs ranging from 60 to 75 °F (16 to 24 °C). The lowest temperature ever recorded in Goodyear is 16 °F (−9 °C). Summers are very hot, with daily high temperatures at or above 100 °F (38 °C) for the entirety of June, July, and August, as well as many days in May and September. An occasional heat wave will spike temperatures over 115 °F (46 °C) briefly. Nighttime lows in the summer months average between 70 and 80 °F (21 and 27 °C), with an occasional overnight low above 80 °F (27 °C) not uncommon. The highest recorded temperature in Goodyear is 125 °F (52 °C).

Snow is rare in the area, occurring once every several years. Lows in the winter occasionally dip below freezing, which may damage some desert plants such as saguaros and other cacti. In the summer (mainly July, August and early September), the North American Monsoon can hit the Phoenix area in the afternoon and evening (possibly continuing overnight), causing thunderstorms and heavy rain even from a sunny morning. Dust storms are occasional, mainly during the summer.

Climate data for Goodyear, Arizona
Month	Jan	Feb	Mar	Apr	May	Jun	Jul	Aug	Sep	Oct	Nov	Dec	Year
Record high °F (°C)	89 (32)	93 (34)	100 (38)	105 (41)	115 (46)	125 (52)	125 (52)	120 (49)	116 (47)	109 (43)	98 (37)	89 (32)	125 (52)
Mean daily maximum °F (°C)	65 (18)	70 (21)	76 (24)	85 (29)	94 (34)	103 (39)	105 (41)	103 (39)	98 (37)	87 (31)	74 (23)	64 (18)	85 (30)
Mean daily minimum °F (°C)	42 (6)	45 (7)	50 (10)	56 (13)	64 (18)	72 (22)	79 (26)	79 (26)	72 (22)	59 (15)	48 (9)	41 (5)	59 (15)
Record low °F (°C)	16 (−9)	22 (−6)	22 (−6)	27 (−3)	36 (2)	49 (9)	57 (14)	50 (10)	44 (7)	31 (−1)	22 (−6)	20 (−7)	16 (−9)
Average precipitation inches (mm)	0.99 (25)	1.28 (33)	0.97 (25)	0.37 (9.4)	0.11 (2.8)	0.04 (1.0)	0.83 (21)	1.23 (31)	0.95 (24)	0.49 (12)	0.68 (17)	0.99 (25)	8.93 (227)
Source: The Weather Channel

== Demographics ==
Historical population
Census	Pop.	Note	%±
1930	1,135		—
1950	1,254		—
1960	1,654		31.9%
1970	2,140		29.4%
1980	2,747		28.4%
1990	6,258		127.8%
2000	18,911		202.2%
2010	65,275		245.2%
2020	95,294		46.0%
2024 (est.)	118,186	▲	24.0%
U.S. Decennial Census; 2020 Census

=== Racial and ethnic composition ===
Goodyear, Arizona – racial and ethnic composition Note: the US Census treats Hispanic/Latino as an ethnic category. This table excludes Latinos from the racial categories and assigns them to a separate category. Hispanics/Latinos may be of any race.
Race / ethnicity (NH = non-Hispanic)	Pop. 1980	Pop. 1990	Pop. 2000	Pop. 2010	Pop. 2020
White alone (NH)	2,291 (83.40%)	3,837 (61.31%)	13,206 (69.83%)	38,064 (58.31%)	49,748 (52.20%)
Black or African American alone (NH)	155 (5.64%)	425 (6.79%)	962 (5.09%)	4,132 (6.33%)	6,876 (7.22%)
Native American or Alaska Native alone (NH)	27 (0.98%)	123 (1.97%)	175 (0.93%)	638 (0.98%)	860 (0.90%)
Asian alone (NH)	23 (0.84%)	82 (1.31%)	315 (1.67%)	2,729 (4.18%)	3,763 (3.95%)
Pacific Islander alone (NH)	—	—	14 (0.07%)	96 (0.15%)	246 (0.26%)
Other race alone (NH)	2 (0.07%)	11 (0.18%)	18 (0.10%)	76 (0.12%)	474 (0.50%)
Mixed race or multiracial (NH)	—	—	288 (1.52%)	1,404 (2.15%)	4,027 (4.23%)
Hispanic or Latino (any race)	249 (9.06%)	1,780 (28.44%)	3,933 (20.80%)	18,136 (27.78%)	29,300 (30.75%)
Total	2,747 (100.00%)	6,258 (100.00%)	18,911 (100.00%)	65,275 (100.00%)	95,294 (100.00%)

=== 2020 census ===
As of the 2020 census, there were 95,294 people, 32,452 households, and 25,165 families in the city. The population density was 498.14 inhabitants per square mile (192.3/km^{2}). There were 36,205 housing units at an average density of 189.26 per square mile (73.1/km^{2}); 10.4% of housing units were vacant, with a homeowner vacancy rate of 2.1% and a rental vacancy rate of 10.3%.

Of the 32,452 households, 35.1% had children under the age of 18 living in them. Of all households, 61.5% were married-couple households, 12.6% were households with a male householder and no spouse or partner present, and 19.1% were households with a female householder and no spouse or partner present. About 17.1% of all households were made up of individuals and 7.8% had someone living alone who was 65 years of age or older.

The median age was 39.8 years. 23.3% of residents were under the age of 18 and 18.6% of residents were 65 years of age or older. For every 100 females there were 89.1 males, and for every 100 females age 18 and over there were 84.9 males age 18 and over.

97.4% of residents lived in urban areas, while 2.6% lived in rural areas.

Racial composition as of the 2020 census
Race	Number	Percent
White	56,455	59.2%
Black or African American	7,290	7.7%
American Indian and Alaska Native	1,305	1.4%
Asian	3,951	4.1%
Native Hawaiian and Other Pacific Islander	284	0.3%
Some other race	11,742	12.3%
Two or more races	14,267	15.0%
Hispanic or Latino (of any race)	29,300	30.7%

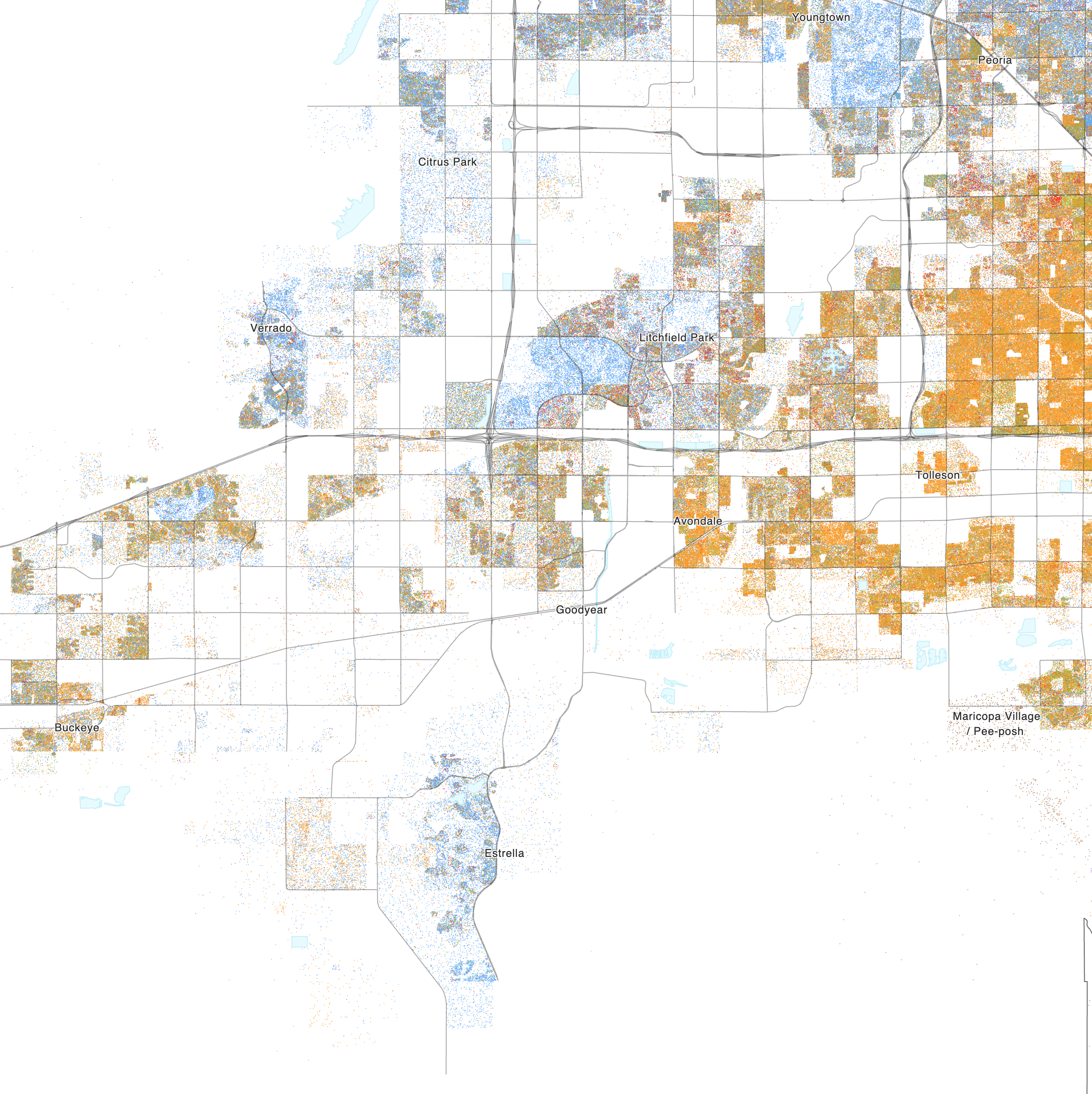
Map of racial distribution in Goodyear, 2020 U.S. census. Each dot is one person: ⬤ White ⬤ Black ⬤ Asian ⬤ Hispanic ⬤ Multiracial ⬤ Native American/Other

The most reported ancestries in 2020 were:

- Mexican (25.3%)
- German (14.8%)
- English (13.6%)
- Irish (11.6%)
- African American (5.8%)
- Italian (4.8%)
- Polish (2.8%)
- Scottish (2.6%)
- French (2.3%)
- Filipino (2.3%)

=== 2010 census ===
As of the 2010 census, there were 65,275 people, 21,491 households, _ families residing in the city. The population density was 341.43 inhabitants per square mile (131.8/km^{2}). There were 25,027 housing units at an average density of 130.91 per square mile (50.5/km^{2}). The racial makeup of the city was 71.89% White, 6.70% African American, 1.30% Native American, 4.34% Asian, 0.17% Pacific Islander, 11.68% from some other races and 3.93% from two or more races. Hispanic or Latino people of any race were 27.78% of the population.

=== 2000 census ===
As of the 2000 census, there were 18,911 people, 6,179 households, and 4,986 families residing in the city. The population density was 162.4 inhabitants per square mile (62.7/km^{2}). There were 6,771 housing units at an average density of 58.1 per square mile (22.4/km^{2}). The racial makeup of the city was 78.13% White, 5.20% African American, 1.06% Native American, 1.71% Asian, 0.08% Pacific Islander, 10.87% from some other races and 2.95% from two or more races. Hispanic or Latino people of any race were 20.80% of the population.

There were 6,179 households, out of which 32.7% had children under the age of 18 living with them, 71.1% were married couples living together, 6.4% had a female householder with no husband present, and 19.3% were non-families. 14.1% of all households were made up of individuals, and 3.7% had someone living alone who was 65 years of age or older. The average household size was 2.68 and the average family size was 2.94.

In the city, the population was spread out, with 22.2% under the age of 18, 8.7% from 18 to 24, 34.1% from 25 to 44, 25.1% from 45 to 64, and 9.9% who were 65 years of age or older. The median age was 36 years. For every 100 females, there were 103.7 males. For every 100 females age 18 and over, there were 102.5 males.

The median income for a household in the city was $57,492, and the median income for a family was $60,707. Males had a median income of $40,702 versus $28,410 for females. The per capita income for the city was $22,506. About 3.6% of families and 6.1% of the population were below the poverty line, including 8.7% of those under age 18 and 3.7% of those age 65 or over.

=== Housing and income ===
According to realtor website Zillow, the average price of a home as of June 30, 2025, in Goodyear is $472,852.

As of the 2023 American Community Survey, there are 38,956 estimated households in Goodyear with an average of 2.76 persons per household. The city has a median household income of $105,160. Approximately 7.4% of the city's population lives at or below the poverty line. Goodyear has an estimated 58.2% employment rate, with 41.4% of the population holding a bachelor's degree or higher and 95.1% holding a high school diploma.

== Economy ==
=== Top Employers ===
According to the city's 2024 Annual Comprehensive Financial Report, the largest employers in the city are:

Number	Employer	Number of employees	Percentage
1	Amazon Fulfillment	2,260	4.89%
2	UPS ‐ Regional Ops Center	1,860	4.03%
3	Chewy	1,490	3.23%
4	Abrazo Healthcare (West Valley Hospital)	1,150	2.49%
5	Macy's	1,020	2.21%
6	Meyer Burger	569	1.23%
7	Subzero / Wolf	510	1.10%
8	City of Hope (Cancer Treatment Centers of America)	500	1.08%
9	Mlily USA	420	0.91%
10	Andersen Windows	400	0.87%
—	Total	10,179	22.04%

== Government and infrastructure ==
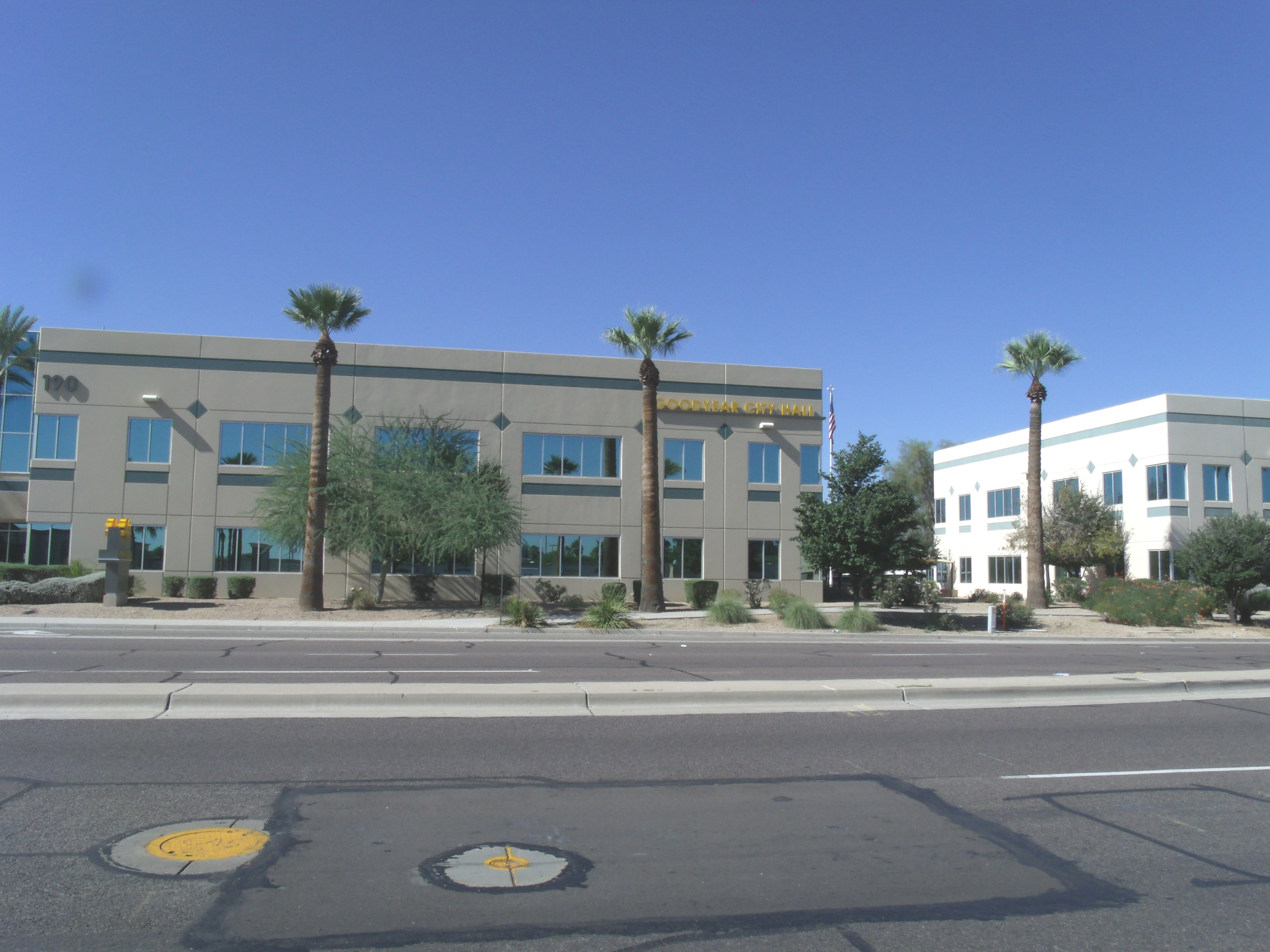
Goodyear City Hall at the former location on Litchfield Road

Goodyear has a council-manager form of government. The current mayor is Joe Pizzillo, a former city councilman who is completing the mayoral term of Georgia Lord, who died in December 2021. Lord was elected to fill a two-year unexpired term as mayor of the city of Goodyear in March 2011, was re-elected to serve a second term as Mayor in 2013, and was elected to serve her final term in 2017. There are six councilmembers, with three-term limits.

Goodyear City Hall is located at 1900 N. Civic Square. Opening in August 2022, Goodyear City Hall was relocated from its previous location on Litchfield Road. The new city hall complex also houses a new two-story library (Georgia T. Lord Library, named after the late Mayor Lord), a two-acre park, office space, a parking garage, and space for new restaurants, retail and entertainment.

The Arizona Department of Corrections operates the Arizona State Prison Complex-Perryville in Goodyear. The prison houses the female death row.

== Education ==
Several school districts serve the city of Goodyear. Elementary school districts include Avondale Elementary School District, Liberty Elementary School District, Litchfield Elementary School District, and Mobile Elementary School District. High school districts include Agua Fria Union High School District and Buckeye Union High School District.

=== Elementary/middle schools ===
- Incito Schools
- Mabel Padgett Elementary School
- Palm Valley Elementary School
- Desert Star Elementary School
- Centerra Mirage S.T.E.M Academy
- Copper Trails Elementary School
- Desert Thunder Elementary School
- Estrella Mountain Elementary School K–8
- Las Brisas Academy Elementary School
- Westar Elementary School
- Western Sky Middle School
- Wildflower Elementary School
- Odyssey Preparatory Academy
- St. John Vianney Catholic School

=== High schools ===
- Desert Edge High School
- Millennium High School
- Estrella Foothills High School
- Goodyear High School (Under construction by the Agua Fria Union High School District to open for the 2025–2026 school year)

=== Colleges and universities ===
Franklin Pierce University has had a campus here since 2008, when the New Hampshire-based university signed a lease with the city to purchase 30 acres (120,000 m^{2}) of land. It offers a Doctor of Physical Therapy program and other healthcare-related programs.

== Sports ==
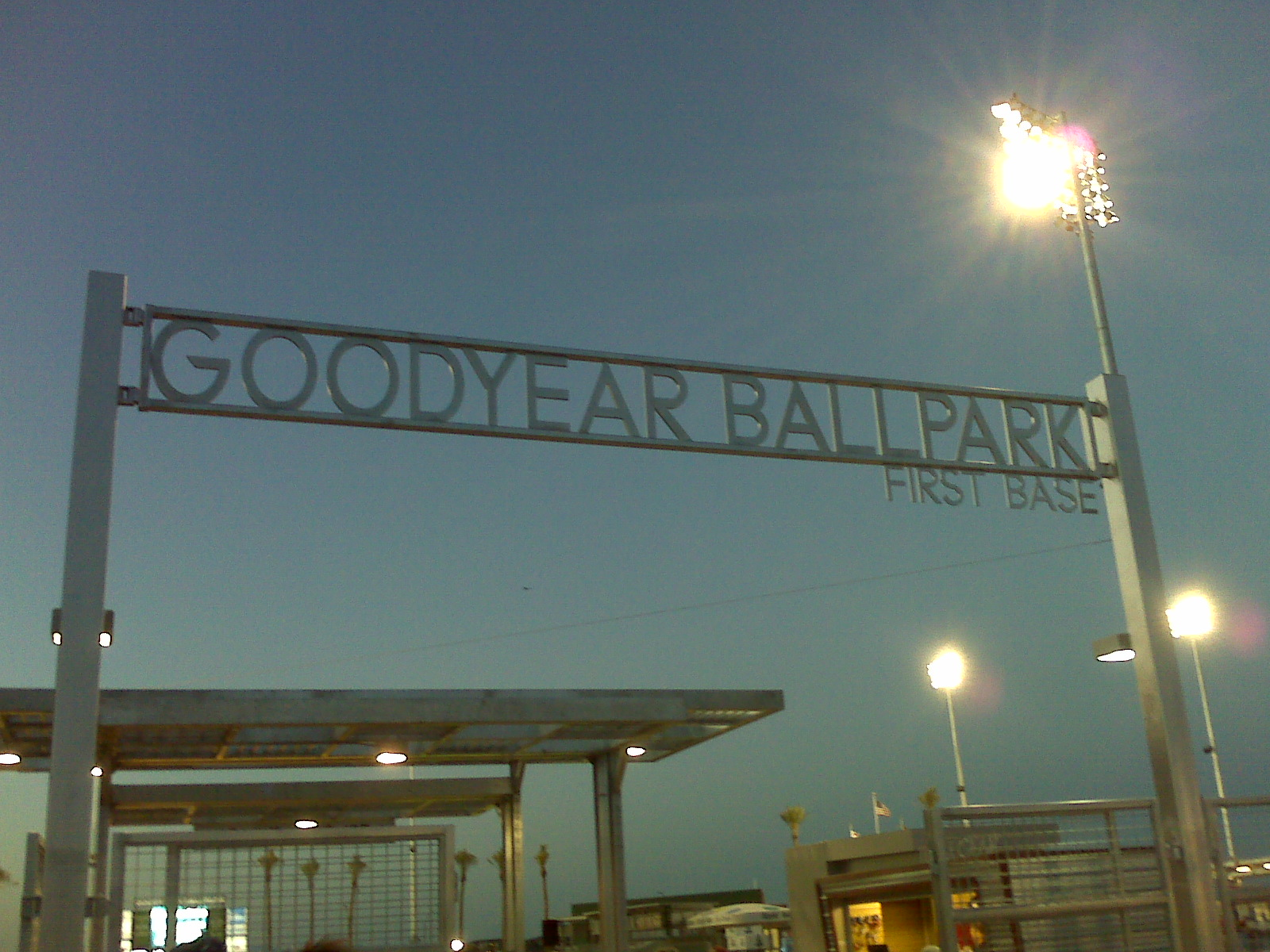
Goodyear Ballpark

Goodyear is known as a site for professional baseball teams' spring training sessions. The Cleveland Guardians of Major League Baseball's American League moved their spring training facility to Goodyear from Winter Haven, Florida and rejoined the Cactus League in February 2009, after a 15-year absence. Before that, the Guardians (then known as the Indians) held spring training for many years in Tucson.

On April 7, 2008, Goodyear's city council unanimously approved a memorandum to fund a new $33 million baseball spring training complex for Major League Baseball's Cincinnati Reds and Cleveland Guardians. This includes a 10,000-seat park, Goodyear Ballpark, that opened in 2009. The Reds and the Guardians have separate offices, clubhouses and practice fields. The Guardians had held their spring training in Tucson for many years until moving to Winter Haven in 1993. They agreed in 2006 to return their spring training location to Arizona at Goodyear.

The Goodyear Centennials, of the Freedom Pro Baseball League, played their home games at the Goodyear Ballpark. Two other baseball teams in the Arizona Complex League, the Arizona Complex League Guardians and the Arizona Complex League Reds, also play at the stadium.

== Transportation ==
=== Air ===
Phoenix Goodyear Airport is located here. It has an 8,500 feet (2,600 m) runway capable of handling large jet aircraft. This airport, used by many international airlines for aircraft maintenance and storage, has no active commercial air service.

=== Rail ===
Union Pacific operates a railroad that goes through Goodyear. Rail lines provide Goodyear with access to 23 states in the western two-thirds of the United States.

=== Road transport ===
Interstate 10 passes through Goodyear, heading west to Buckeye and Los Angeles. I-10 heads east to Phoenix, Tucson, and the Southern states.

The city is also served by the western ends of several bus routes of the Valley Metro Bus.

Other roads and highways serve the area. Loop 303 starts as Cotton Lane then heads up north to Surprise and then to Interstate 17. Van Buren Street and McDowell, Indian School and Camelback Roads are major arterial roads leading from the extreme western Phoenix area to past Scottsdale in the east. MC 85 (Maricopa County Highway 85) is a highway running from Arizona State Route 85 in Buckeye to Loop 202 in Phoenix. The highway passes the southern sections of Goodyear.

==== Public transportation ====
Valley Metro operates public transportation in Goodyear. They operate the Avondale ZOOM neighborhood circulator, the 562 Goodyear Express during weekday rush hours, which connects Goodyear Park and Ride to Downtown Phoenix, and the 17 McDowell bus on Monday thru Saturday (Sunday service ends at 99th Avenue on the Avondale/Tolleson border). Goodyear is also a member of WeRIDE, which operates demand-responsive transport in Peoria, Goodyear, Avondale, and Surprise.

==== Road improvements ====
Interstate 10 was built through Goodyear in the late 20th century. Between 2008 and 2014, the road had significant expansions. It was expanded from two lanes in each direction to five or six (including one HOV lane starting near Loop 303 going east). There were also new interchanges, including Exit 122 (Perryville Road), Exit 123 (Citrus Road) and Exit 125 (Sarival Avenue).

==== Loop 303 improvement ====
The Arizona Department of Transportation built a new interchange near the Interstate 10/Loop 303 junctions. The interchange is being expanded from a diamond interchange to a stack interchange. As a result, Loop 303 under Interstate 10 was cleared, and Exit 124 on Interstate 10 has been shut down; the new interchange was completed in 2014.

South of Interstate 10, Loop 303 is being planned to extend to a future State Route 30. Loop 303 will go south of future State Route 30 to Estrella Mountain Ranch and to Interstate 8 near Mobile, Arizona.

==== State Route 30 (formerly State Route 801) ====
Arizona State Route 30 (originally designated as State Route 801) is a proposed highway south of Interstate 10 that will relieve traffic congestion. It is planned to run between Arizona State Route 85 to Interstate 17.

== Notable people ==
- Carrick Felix, former Arizona State Sun Devils men's basketball and former Cleveland Cavaliers player.
- Hersey Hawkins, former NBA player. Moved to Estrella, Goodyear and served as an assistant coach for the varsity basketball team at Estrella Foothills High School.
- Gilbert Levin, scientist and developer of one of the life on Mars experiments, as part of the Viking program. Owned a winter home in Estrella, Goodyear.
- Rick Manning, former MLB player and current baseball broadcaster
- Tim Raines, MLB Hall of Famer and resident of Estrella, Goodyear
- Josh Rojas, professional baseball player and alumnus of Millennium High School (Arizona).
- Mitchell Watt, former Buffalo Bulls basketball player from Desert Edge High School
