= Second Pinal County Courthouse =

- U.S. National Register of Historic Places
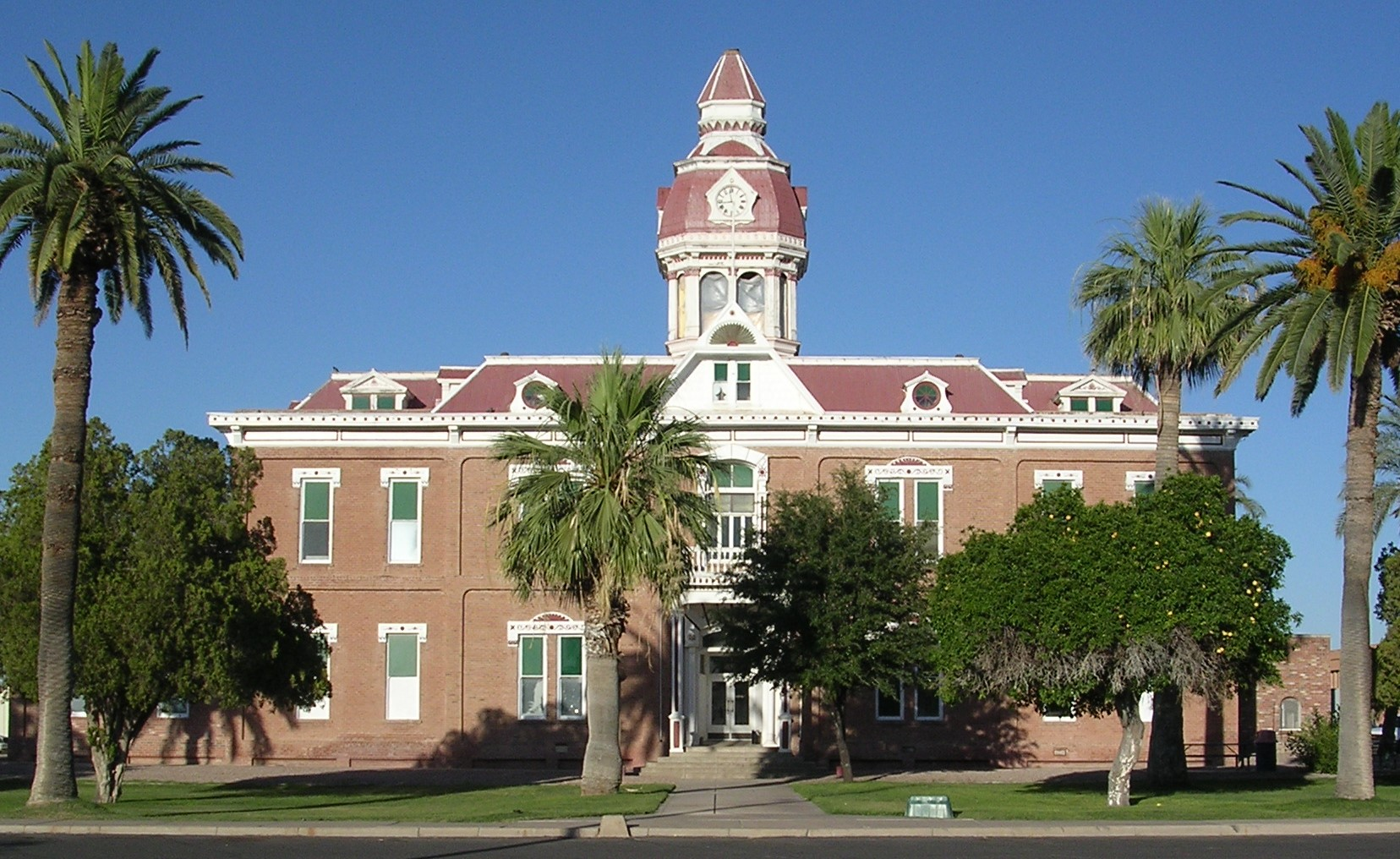
- Second Pinal County Courthouse, 2005

- Location within Arizona Location within the United States
- Location: Pinal and 12th Sts., Florence, Arizona
- Coordinates: 33°1′56″N 111°23′6″W
- Area: 2 acres (0.81 ha)
- Built: 1891; 135 years ago
- Architect: James M. Creighton
- Architectural style: Late Victorian
- NRHP reference No.: 78000568
- Added to NRHP: August 2, 1978

The Second Pinal County Courthouse, built in 1891, is an historic three-story redbrick courthouse located at Pinal and 12th streets in Florence, Pinal County, Arizona, United States. Designed by prominent Arizona architect James M. Creighton in the Late Victorian Revival style of architecture, it is Pinal County's second courthouse. It is topped by an ornate clock tower, but due to a lack of funds, the clockworks was never installed. Instead a clock was painted on it with the hands set at 11:44. Replaced in 1961 by another courthouse, it fell into disrepair and it was closed in 2005. In 2007 it was declared to be one of the most endangered historic buildings in Arizona. In January 2011, the county supervisors approved a plan to renovate the building and restore it to its former glory so that it could be used by the supervisors and other county entities. On August 2, 1978, it was added to the National Register of Historic Places.

== History ==
=== Origins of Florence ===
In 1866, the town of Florence, Arizona was established. The town was formed from land patented by Levi Ruggles, who later transferred the title of the land to the Town of Florence. Ruggles was also responsible for the original planned layout of Florence. It was the fifth oldest settlement in the state. In 1868 a post office was built and in 1869 a general store.

In 1875, Pinal County was established from portions of Maricopa and Pima counties. Florence became the county seat. The first Pinal County Courthouse was constructed in 1877 and is now part of McFarland State Historic Park. It is located on the corner of Ruggles and Main streets in Florence.

On December 21, 1877, the Silver King Mine was established. The mine was operational for about 35 years and closed on May 5, 1912. The prosperity of the mine caused the establishment of the town of Pinal, located three miles southwest of present-day Superior.

In 1879 the City of Casa Grande was founded. The town, originally called Terminus, was the end of the rail line. Jere Fryer and Pauline Cushman, a Civil War Union spy, met and moved to Casa Grande. They later married and operated a hotel. Jere Fryer eventually became the Pinal County sheriff. The establishment of Casa Grande marked the beginning of rail transportation in the area.

In 1888 the “Duel at the Tunnel Saloon” took place in Florence between ex-sheriff Pete Gabriel and his ex-deputy Joe Phy. This became the most notorious gunfight in the history of Florence. Both Gabriel and Phy were shot. Gabriel recovered and lived another 10 years; however, Phy died from his wounds. The duel reportedly stemmed from jealousy over a woman.

=== Construction of the Second Pinal County Courthouse ===
On March 1 1890, the Pinal County Board of Supervisors (W.C. Smith, G.W. Campbell, and E.W. Childs) hired architect J.M. Creighton to design a second county courthouse. The supervisors wanted to build a structure that represented their belief in future prosperity through mining and agriculture. Contracts to build the Second Pinal County Courthouse and jail cells were awarded to A.J. Doran and T.A. Adams. The two contracts totaled $34,765, an extravagant sum for the time.

The Courthouse was completed on February 2 1891. Built in American-Victorian architecture and totaling 15,000 square feet, the building housed the offices of the Supervisors, the Recorder, the Treasurer and the Assessor. The Sheriff's Office and jail occupied the back end of the first floor. The clock tower was constructed but there was not enough money to finance the installation of working clocks. Instead, clock facings were added with the time set at 11:44.

One of the many who were tried at the 1891 Courthouse was Pearl Hart. On June 4 1899, Pearl was jailed in the courthouse for robbing a stagecoach.

On July 1 1905, J.M. Bernal completed the painting of the courthouse. The building was given two coats of paint and close inspection showed that the work was well done. The bright and finished appearance demonstrated that Mr. Bernal was a conscientious workman, even on a county contract and understood his business. He was assisted in the painting by Ygnacio Moreno. “It is seldom that a mistake is made when county contracts are given to local people and the Board of Supervisors have certainly not erred in this instance.”

In 1908 Florence was incorporated and in 1909 the Arizona Territorial Prison moved from Yuma to Florence. Today, Florence is still recognized as being the home of the Arizona State Prison.

Arizona officially became a state on February 14, 1912. By 1917, the first and only two-story additions were made to the northwest and southwest corners of the courthouse transforming the cruciform-shaped building to a “T” shape.

=== Growth of Pinal County ===
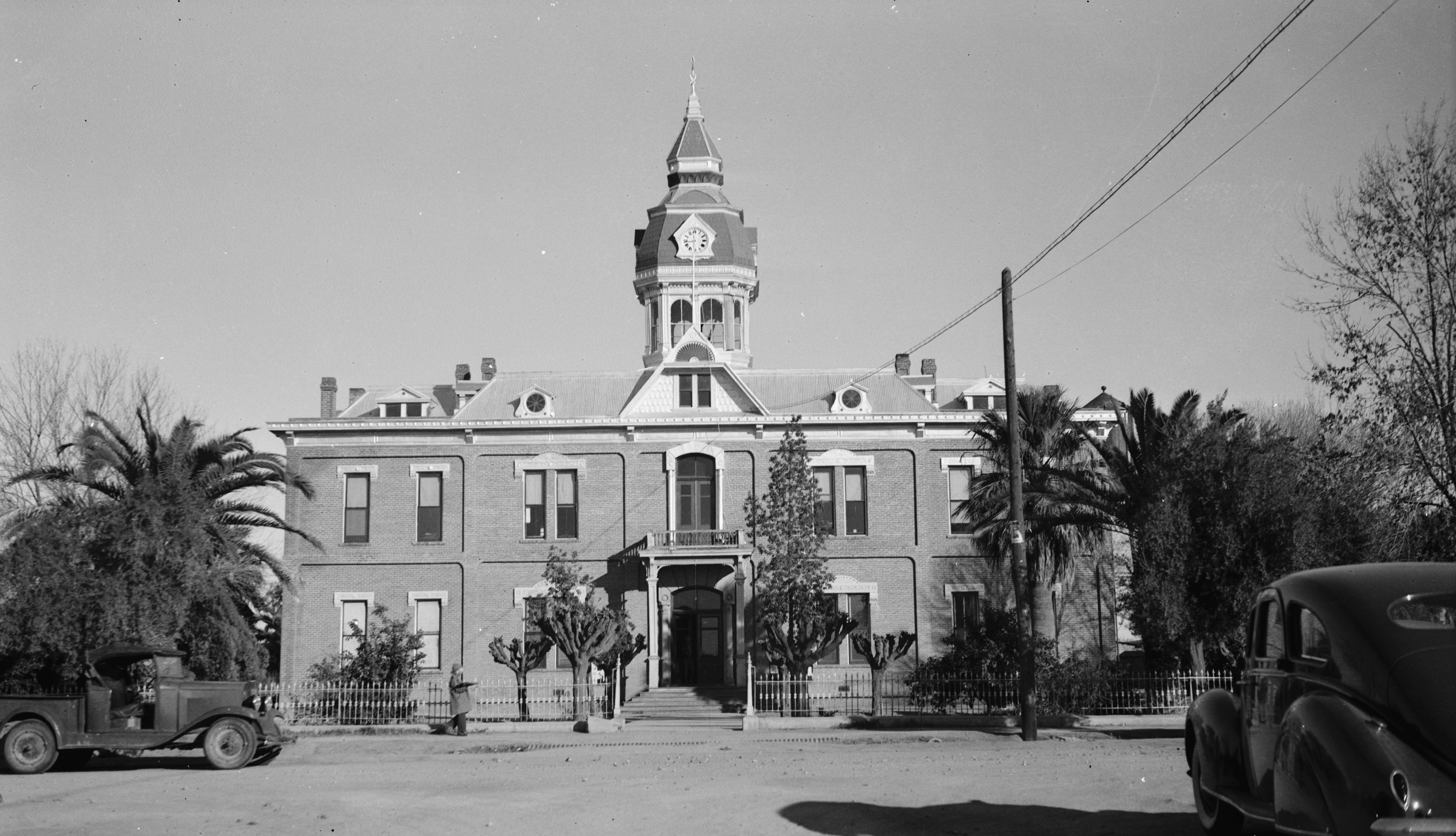
Pinal County Courthouse in 1938

In 1925, Ernest W. McFarland was elected Pinal County Attorney. He served in that capacity until 1930.

Pinal County continued to grow and prosper. In 1926, the Coolidge Dam was dedicated, increasing agricultural opportunities in Pinal County. Humorist Will Rogers attended the dedication. He took one look as the Gila River was filling the storage dam and said, “If that was my lake, I’d mow it.”

In 1930 Eva Dugan received a sanity hearing in the courthouse after being convicted of murder. She was deemed sane and put to death by hanging. Her head came off during the execution. Death by hanging was immediately discontinued. She remains the only woman executed in Arizona. Ernest McFarland served as the attorney for the prosecution. In 1933 Winnie Ruth Judd received a sanity hearing in the courthouse after a double murder conviction. She was represented by McFarland. She was deemed insane and was not executed. Her trials and tribulations become a footnote in Arizona political history.

In that same year, the Works Progress Administration, (WPA) labor helped with the first of the 3 single-story additions to the courthouse. This addition expanded the northeast edge of the building.

In 1934 McFarland was elected as Pinal County Superior Court Justice. He served in this capacity until 1940. Then in 1940, McFarland was elected to the U.S. Senate, where he authored the “G.I. Bill”.

In 1943, the prisoners were moved out of the jail of the courthouse into a new county jail. In 1952, the Pinal County Board of Supervisors voted to tear down the cupola, as its weight was causing the building to sag. County residents protested this action and the cupola was saved.

In 1955, McFarland was elected Governor of Arizona. McFarland was chosen as the Associate Justice of Arizona Supreme Court in 1964. He was elevated to Chief Justice in 1968.

In 1961, the third Pinal County Courthouse was opened and consisted of some 30,000 square feet. The second courthouse was still in use by county offices and in 1975 a third addition was constructed and spanned the entire length of the north side of the building. Later, in 1982, the fourth addition was completed on the southeast side of the courthouse. The building which had 15,000 square feet when first constructed, was now 24,000.

=== Restoration of the Courthouse ===
By the late 1990s the Pinal County Board of Supervisors began researching the cost of restoring the courthouse. A building assessment report concluded that the cost of fully repairing the courthouse would be $3 million.

In 2002, the first construction grant to repair the courthouse was secured from the State Park Heritage Fund. The grant of nearly $100,000 and matching funds from Pinal County were used to repair the clock tower. In January 2003, the multi-phased rehabilitation project began, consisting of restoration of the clock tower, reinforcing the roof structure, reconstruction of the main entrance porch and restoration of some chimneys, roof dormers, exterior brick, and ornamental sheet metal items. Swan Architects, Inc. was awarded the contract. This project was completed in January 2011 at a cost of $1.3 million.

On May 19 2004, the fourth and current Pinal County Courthouse was dedicated. The five-story building, located on Jason Lopez Circle, cost $26 million and provided the county with 145,000 square feet of space. While the Second Pinal County Courthouse had one courtroom for the one county judge, the new courthouse consists of seven courtrooms for nine judges. The increase in judgeships alone shows the growth of the county over the last 130 years as does the increase of the number of county employees. Starting with less than 20 employees, Pinal County currently employs around 2,100 people.

In January 2011, the Pinal County Board of Supervisors voted unanimously to appropriate funds to make further repairs to the 1891 Second Pinal County Courthouse. On October 18, 2011, the Arizona Historical Advisory Commission (AHAC) sent a letter to Pinal County announcing that The “1891 Pinal County Courthouse Renovation” project was designated as an official Arizona Centennial Legacy Project.

On December 19 2012, a dedication and ribbon-cutting ceremony was held after a 12-month renovation project, including ridding the building of asbestos and aluminum wiring. The total renovation costs were $6 million.

=== Present Day ===
The main floor now includes the meeting room where the five-member Pinal County Board of Supervisors hold public meetings; it's the same room that was once the jail. Interior windows at the top of the walls on the left and right side of the room still have the iron bars from the old jail, as a nod to history. The building features a main staircase; its grandiosity is one of the courthouse's most defining features.

The second floor of the courthouse includes offices for the five supervisors and the County Manager, as well as the main room, which used to be the courtroom. It is now a place where special events and community gatherings are held, including weddings.

The clock facings on the tower are not functional. When the building was first completed, there was not enough money to install working clocks. Instead, clock facings made of pressed metal were installed on each side of the tower, with the hands placed at 11:44.
