= Central Arizona Correctional Facility =

Medium-security prison

Coordinates: 33°02′14″N 111°22′22″W

- Interactive map of Central Arizona Correctional Facility
- Location: 1401 E Diversion Dam Road Florence, Arizona
- Status: open
- Security class: medium
- Capacity: 1280
- Opened: December 2006
- Managed by: GEO Group

The Central Arizona Correctional Facility is a medium-security privately managed state prison for men located in Florence, Pinal County, Arizona, owned and operated by the GEO Group under contract with the Arizona Department of Corrections.

GEO Group's predecessor firm, Correctional Services Corporation, designed and built the facility. It opened in December 2006 and has the maximum capacity of 1280 prisoners held at a medium security level.

CACF should not be confused with the nearby Central Arizona Detention Center, run by Corrections Corporation of America, which houses prisoners for the United States Marshals Service, TransCor America LLC, U.S. Immigration and Customs Enforcement, Pascua Yaqui Tribe government, and the United States Air Force, but does not house Arizona state prisoners.
