= Central Arizona Detention Center =

Privately owned and operated prison

Coordinates: 33°02′39″N 111°22′30″W

Central Arizona Florence Correctional Complex
- Interactive map of Central Arizona Florence Correctional Complex
- Location: 1155 North Pinal Parkway and 1100 Bowling Road Florence, Arizona
- Status: open
- Security class: Multi Level Security
- Capacity: 4,128
- Opened: 1994
- Managed by: CoreCivic
- Warden: Kris Kline

The Central Arizona Florence Correctional Complex, formerly Central Arizona Detention Center and Florence Correctional Complex, is a privately owned and operated managed prison for men and women located in Florence, Pinal County, Arizona. The facility is run by Corrections Corporation of America and houses prisoners for the United States Marshals Service (USMS), TransCor America LLC, U.S. Immigration and Customs Enforcement (ICE), Pascua Yaqui Tribe, United States Air Force, and City of Mesa.

The 434,000 square foot facility opened in 1994 and is located on 73 acres of land. The facility has approximately 20 housing units. The U.S. Marshal Service holds the majority of the housing units, U.S. Immigration and Customs Enforcement holds one housing unit, and The City of Mesa is in a shared housing unit. The average population of inmates and detainees is 3,555.
