= Pearl Hart =

Canadian-American outlaw (1871–1928)

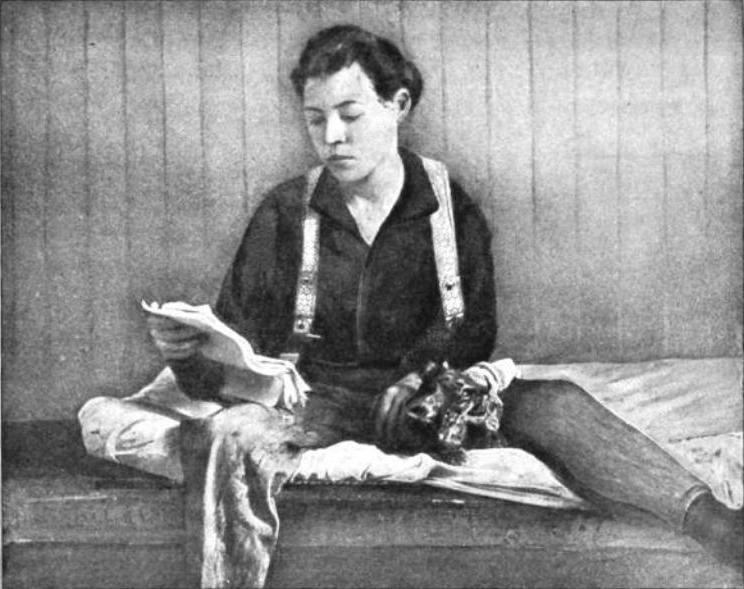
- Hart at the Yuma Territorial Prison, 1899
- Born: Pearl Taylor; 1871; Lindsay, Ontario, Canada
- Died: December 30, 1955 (age 84); Gila County, Arizona, United States
- Other names: (alias) Talo Halo, Bandit Queen, Lady Bandit, Pearl Taylor Hart, Pearl Bywater
- Spouse(s): Frank Hart, George Calvin “Cal” Bywater
- Children: Joe and Emma Hart
- Status: Pardoned
- Motive: Money
- Conviction: Interference with U.S. mail
- Criminal charges: Stagecoach robbery Possession of stolen goods
- Penalty: 5 years (2 served)

Pearl Hart (born Pearl Taylor; 1871 – December 30, 1955) was a Canadian-born outlaw of the American Old West. She committed one of the last recorded stagecoach robberies in the United States, and her crime gained notoriety primarily because of her gender. Many details of Hart's life are uncertain, with available reports being varied and often contradictory.

== Early life ==
Hart was born Pearl Taylor in the Canadian village of Lindsay, Ontario. Her parents were both religious and affluent, and these factors provided their daughter with the best available education. At the age of 16, she was enrolled in a boarding school where she became enamored with a young man, named Hart, who has been variously described as a rake, drunkard, and/or gambler.

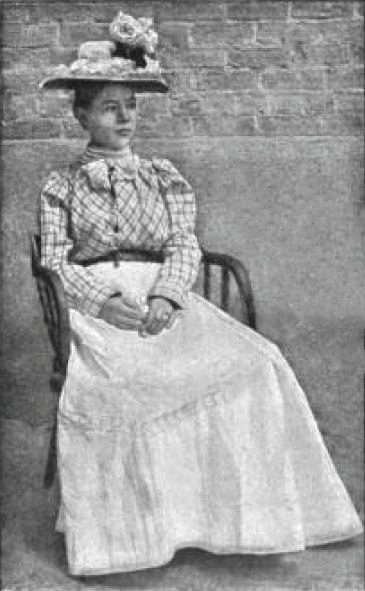
Pearl Hart in Cosmopolitan 1899

Hart left her husband and reconciled several times. During their time together they had two children, a boy and a girl, whom Hart sent to her mother who was then living in Ohio. In 1893, the couple attended the Chicago World's Fair, where he worked for a time as a midway barker. Pearl in turn developed a fascination with the cowboy lifestyle while watching Buffalo Bill's Wild West Show. At the end of the Fair, Hart left her husband again on a train bound for Trinidad, Colorado, possibly in the company of a piano player named Dan Bandman.

During this time Hart worked as a cook and singer, possibly supplementing her income as a demimondaine (prostitute). There are also reports she developed a fondness for cigars, liquor, and morphine during this time.

A variation of this story has Bandman instead of her husband leaving Hart for war.

== The true story ==
As documented in John Boessenecker's book Wildcat, and corroborated by family and the Lindsay historical society, Hart's early life as described in this entry is completely false and details of her later life are also incorrect. Her real name was Lillie Naomi Davy. Hart's father, Albert Davy, was a wandering laborer best known for his heavy drinking and frequent brawling. Albert met Hart's mother, Lindsay native Anna Duval, in 1846. Both were illiterate. Hart was the couple's third child, born in 1871. Her childhood was one of poverty, exacerbated by her father's alcoholism and abuse and, in 1877, his rape of a young woman named Alice Timms. Davy was given a flogging and a one-year jail sentence.

Hart had very little schooling and amidst the chaos of her family life drifted into her earliest acts of crime in 1881 in the Village of Orilia, 50 miles from Lindsay, just after the birth of Davys' eighth child. Hart, then 11, and her brother Willie, 13, were caught stealing a cow and then re-selling it. Lillie was released, but Willie was sentenced to three years in the Boys Reformatory of Upper Canada.

In 1884, after the family was abandoned by Albert Davy, Hart was witness to the horrific gang rape of her mother by four local men.

The family eventually ended up in Rochester NY where they were constant strains on the local systems. Hart had involvements with several abusive men over the years and worked her way west as a young woman largely through prostitution. Her sister Katy was her frequent collaborator over the years, as children in Rochester where they regularly committed crimes, as prostitutes, and later worked together in Katy's stage career.

Hart was never in the Wild West show. She finished her days in Los Angeles living with her daughter and granddaughter and died in 1935.

== Life of crime ==
By early 1898, Hart was in the mining town of Mammoth, Arizona. Some reports indicate she was working as a cook in a boardinghouse. While doing well for a time, her financial outlook took a downturn after the mine closed. About this time Hart attested to receiving a message asking her to return home to her seriously ill mother.

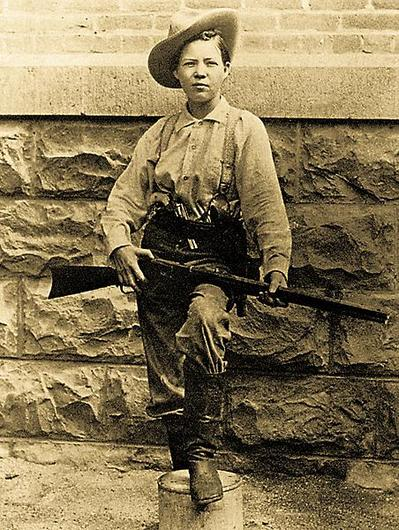
Pearl Hart attired in men's clothing

Looking to raise money, Hart and an acquaintance known only as "Joe Boot" (likely an alias) worked an old mining claim he owned, but found no gold in the claim.

The pair decided to rob a stagecoach that traveled between Globe and Florence, Arizona. The robbery occurred on May 30, 1899, at a watering point near Cane Springs Canyon, about 30 miles southwest of Globe. Hart had cut her hair short and dressed in men's clothing. Hart was armed with a .38 revolver while Boot had a Colt .45. One of the last stagecoach routes still operating in the territory, the run had not been robbed in several years and thus the coach did not have a shotgun messenger. The pair stopped the coach and Boot held a gun on the robbery victims while Hart took $431.20 (about $16,226.21 today) and two firearms from the passengers. After returning $1 to each passenger, she then took the driver's revolver. After the robbers had galloped away on their horses, the driver unhitched one of the horses and headed back to town to alert the sheriff.

Others claim the pair became lost and wandered in circles. Regardless, a posse led by Sheriff Truman of Pinal County caught up with the pair on June 5, 1899. Finding both of them asleep, Sheriff Truman reported that Boot surrendered quietly while Hart fought to avoid capture.

== In and out of jail ==
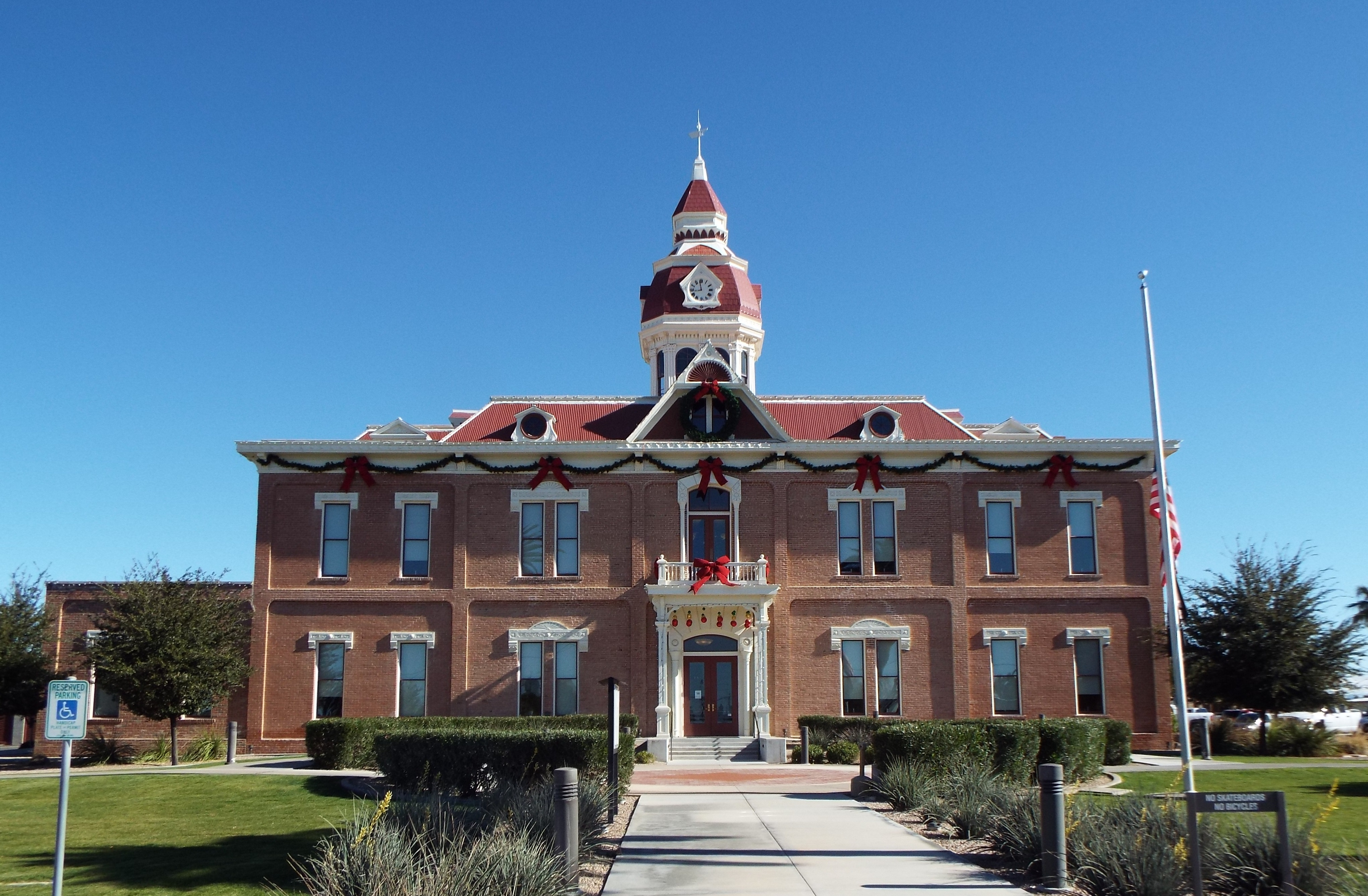
The trial of Pearl Hart was held in the Second Pinal County Courthouse located at 135 Pinal St. in Florence

Following their arrest, Boot was held in Florence while Hart was moved to Tucson, the jail lacking any facilities for a woman. The novelty of a female stagecoach robber quickly spawned a media frenzy and national reporters soon joined the local press clamoring to interview and photograph Hart. One article in Cosmopolitan said Hart was "just the opposite of what would be expected of a woman stage robber," though, "when angry or determined, hard lines show about her eyes and mouth". Locals also became fascinated with her, one local fan giving her a bobcat cub to keep as a pet.

Taking advantage of the relatively weak building material, and possibly with the aid of an assistant, Hart escaped on October 12, 1899, leaving an 18-inch (46 cm) hole in the wall.

Hart and Boot came to trial for robbing the stagecoach passengers in October 1899. During the trial Hart made an impassioned plea to the jury, claiming she needed the money to be able to go to her ailing mother. Judge Fletcher M. Doan was shocked and angered when the jury found her not guilty and scolded the jurors for failure to perform their duties. Immediately following the acquittal, the pair was rearrested on the charge of tampering with U.S. mail.

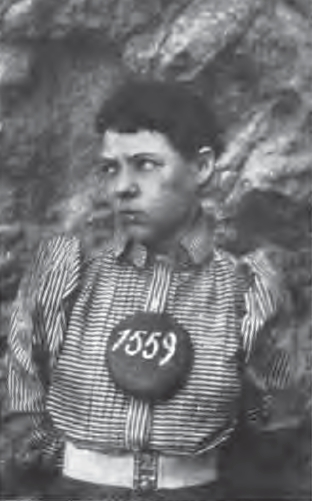
Hart while incarcerated at Yuma Territorial Prison

Both Hart and Boot were sent to Yuma Territorial Prison to serve their sentences. Boot became a prison trusty, driving supply wagons to chain gangs working outside the walls. One day while driving a wagon he escaped and was never seen again. At the time of his escape, Boot had completed less than two years of his 30-year sentence.

The attention Hart had received in jail continued once she was imprisoned. The warden, who enjoyed the attention she attracted, provided her with an oversized 8 by 10 feet (2.4 by 3.0 m) mountainside cell that included a small yard and allowed her to entertain reporters and other guests as well as pose for photographs. Hart, in turn, used her position as the only female at an all-male facility to her advantage, playing admiring guards and prison trusties off of each other in an effort to improve her situation.

Hart's release from prison came in the form of a December 1902 pardon from Arizona Territorial Governor Alexander Brodie. There are accounts that she and the warden were lovers. There is no evidence Hart ever had a third child, so this rumor, if true, may indicate a successful ploy on Hart's part. Upon release from prison, Hart was provided with a train ticket to Kansas City.

== Later life ==
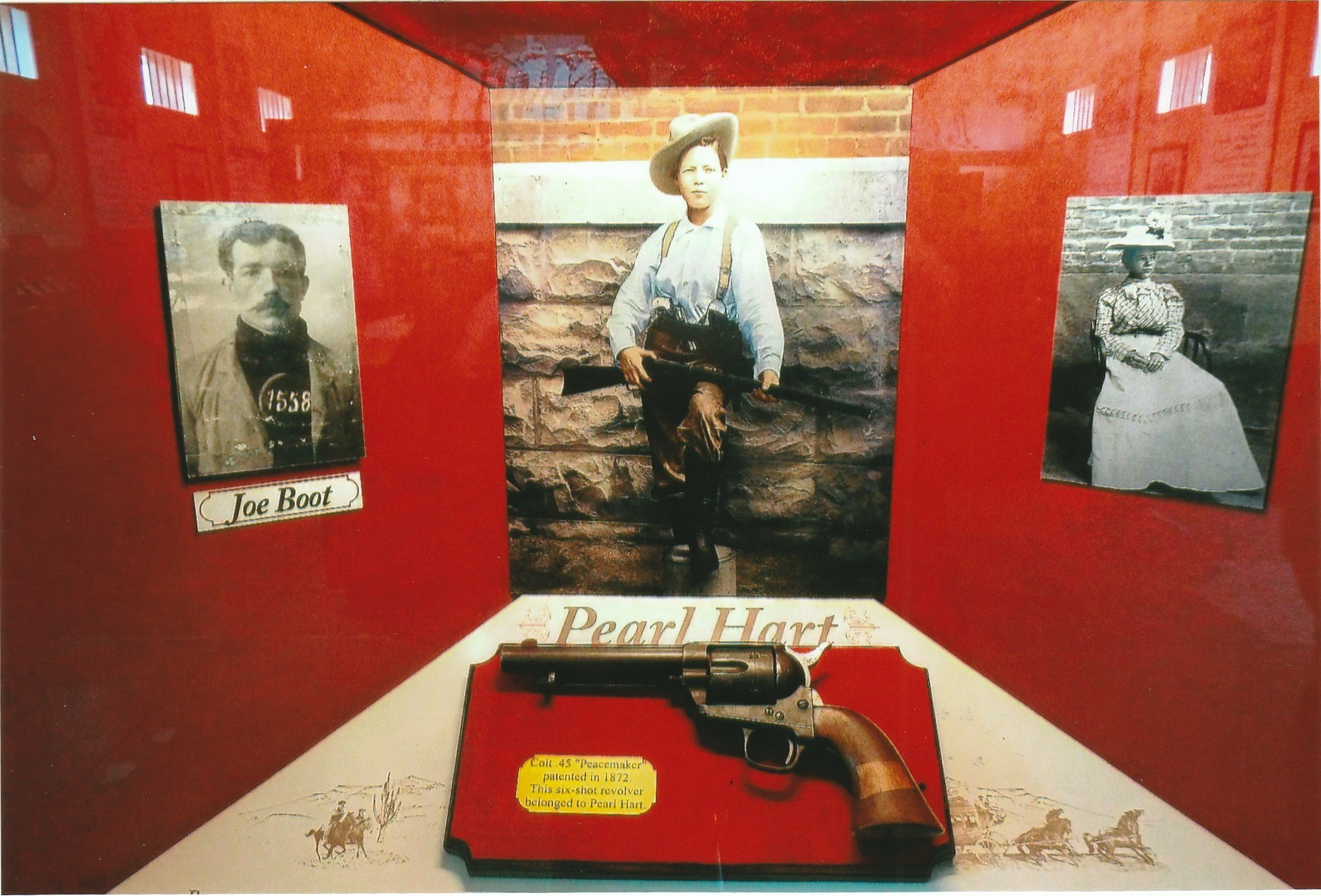
Pearl Hart's gun on display in the Yuma Territorial Prison Museum

After being released from prison, Hart largely appeared in public view. She had a short-lived show where she re-enacted her crime and then spoke about the horrors of Yuma Territorial Prison. Following this she worked, under an alias, as part of Buffalo Bill's Wild West Show. In 1904, Hart was running a cigar store in Kansas City when she was arrested for receiving stolen property.

A census taker in 1940 claimed to have discovered Hart living in Arizona under a different name; she had married again.

== In popular culture ==
In addition to being a staple of pulp western fiction, Hart's exploits have been featured in other venues. The play Lady with a Gun and the musical The Legend of Pearl Hart are also based upon Hart's story.

Pearl Hart was the main character, played by Anne Francis, in a Death Valley Days episode “The Last Stagecoach Robbery” aired March 17, 1964. The episode centered on the holdup committed with Joe Boot and their subsequent capture portraying her as adventurous but kindhearted in her search for notoriety.

She was also portrayed by Beverly Garland in Season 4 Episode 34 Pearl Hart in Tales of Wells Fargo.

The Danish rock band Volbeat has a song called "Pearl Hart" on the album Outlaw Gentlemen & Shady Ladies, released in 2013.

In CBBC's Horrible Histories, Hart is played by Martha Howe-Douglas. Hart is portrayed as a "real Wild West legend" compared to the fictionalised antics of Billy the Kid and Wyatt Earp.
