= McFarland State Historic Park =

Historic park in Florence, Pinal County, Arizona

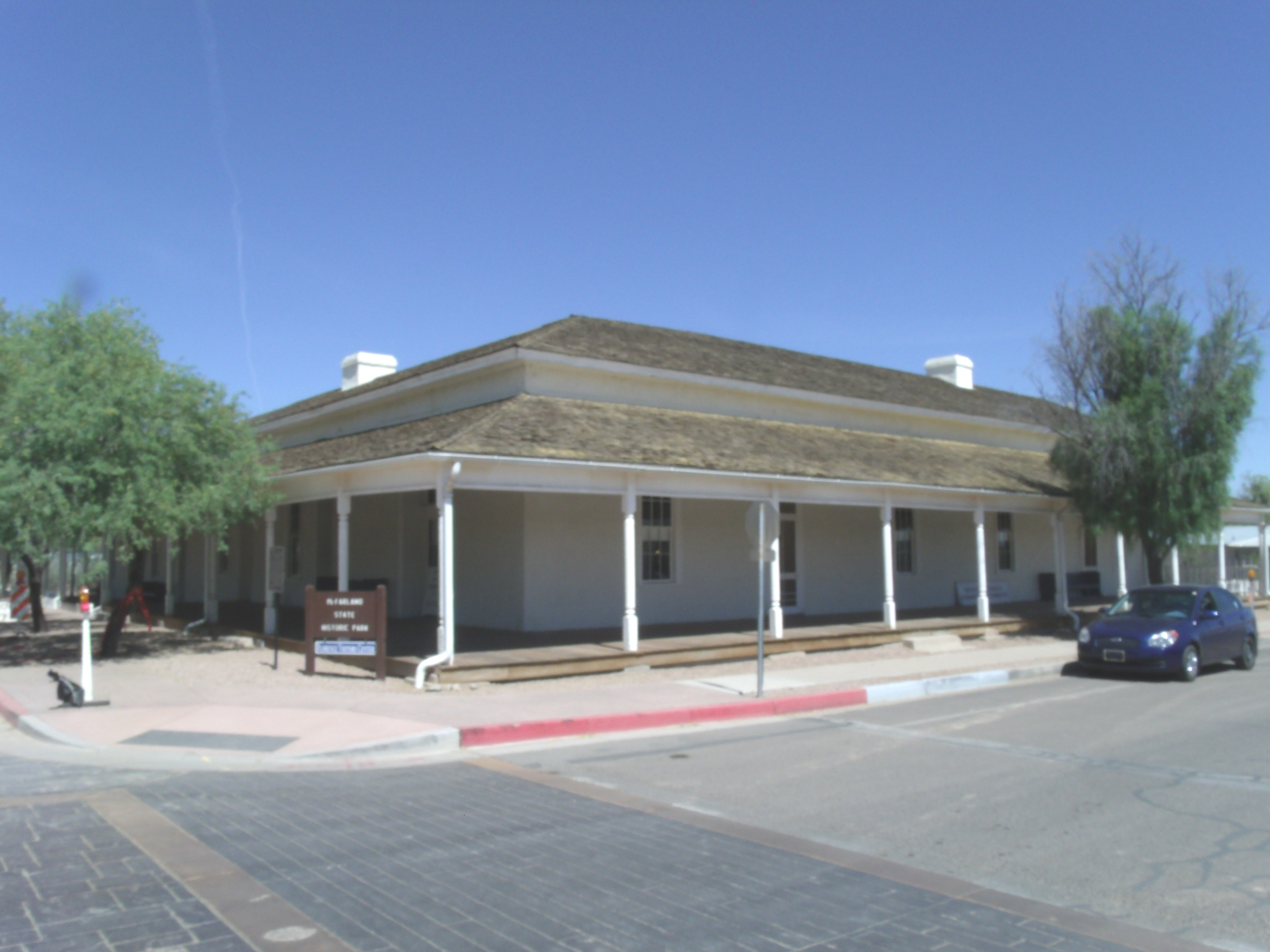
- First Pinal County Courthouse

- Location within Arizona
- Location: Florence, Arizona, United States
- Coordinates: 33°02′09″N 111°23′15″W
- Elevation: 1,500 ft (460 m)
- Established: 1974
- Administrator: Arizona State Parks & Trails
- Visitors: 5,104 (in 2024)
- Website: Official website

McFarland State Historic Park is a historic park located in downtown Florence, Arizona on the corner of Main and Ruggles streets. The park consists of a preserved courthouse and other buildings dating to the Arizona Territory period. The original structure was built in 1878 with the addition of a jail in 1882 and the courthouse in 1891. The courthouse is listed on the National Register of Historic Places.

McFarland State Historic Park commemorates Ernest McFarland (1894–1984), who was successively a US Senator, Governor of Arizona, and Chief Justice of the Arizona Supreme Court. McFarland bought the old courthouse building in 1974, donated it to the state, and paid for its renovation. The park was opened and dedicated October 10, 1979.

The park reopened in February 2011 after repairs and renovations. It had been closed because of Arizona State Parks budget cuts.

== Historic First Pinal County Courthouse ==
First Pinal County Courthouse
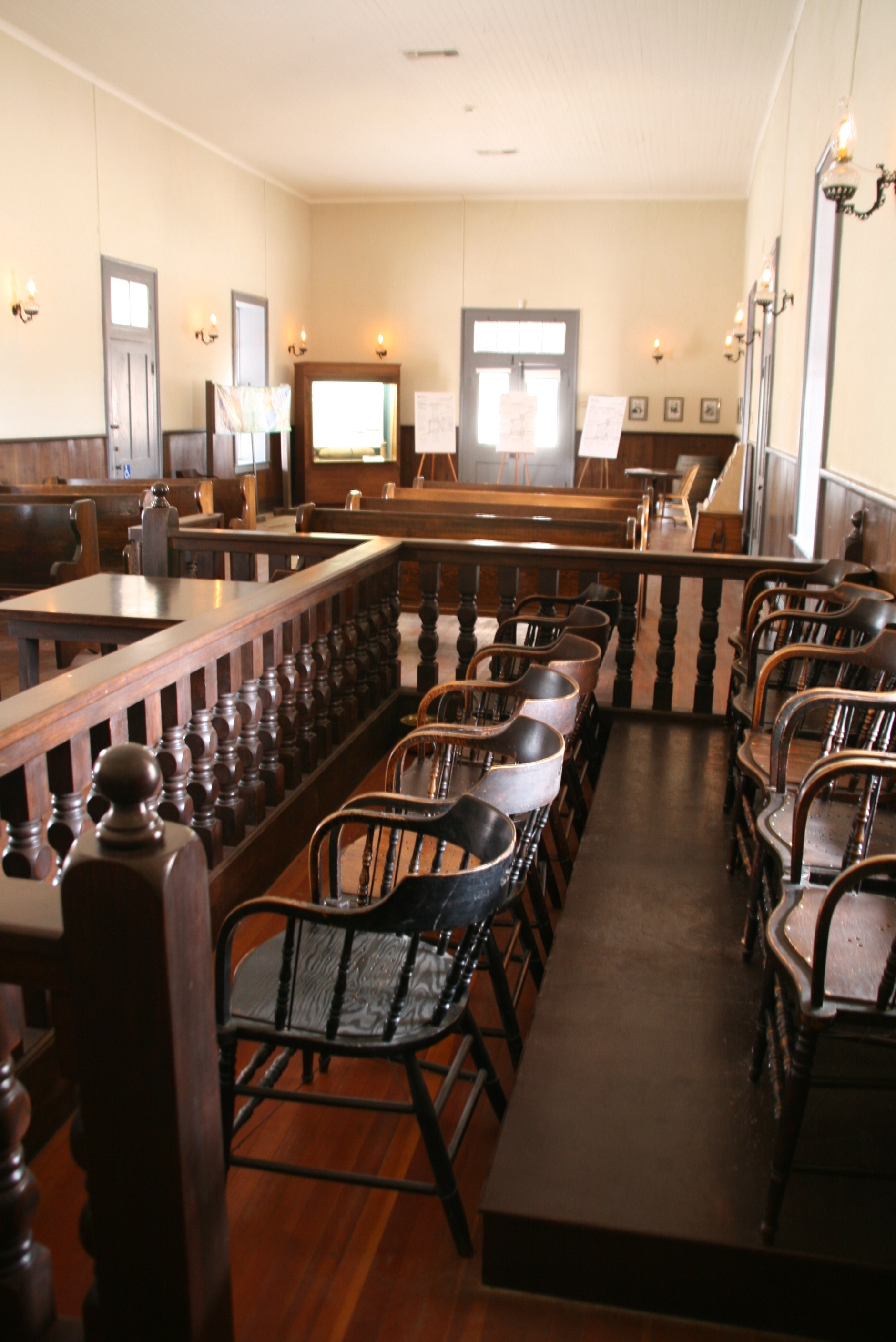
Restored courtroom in the old courthouse

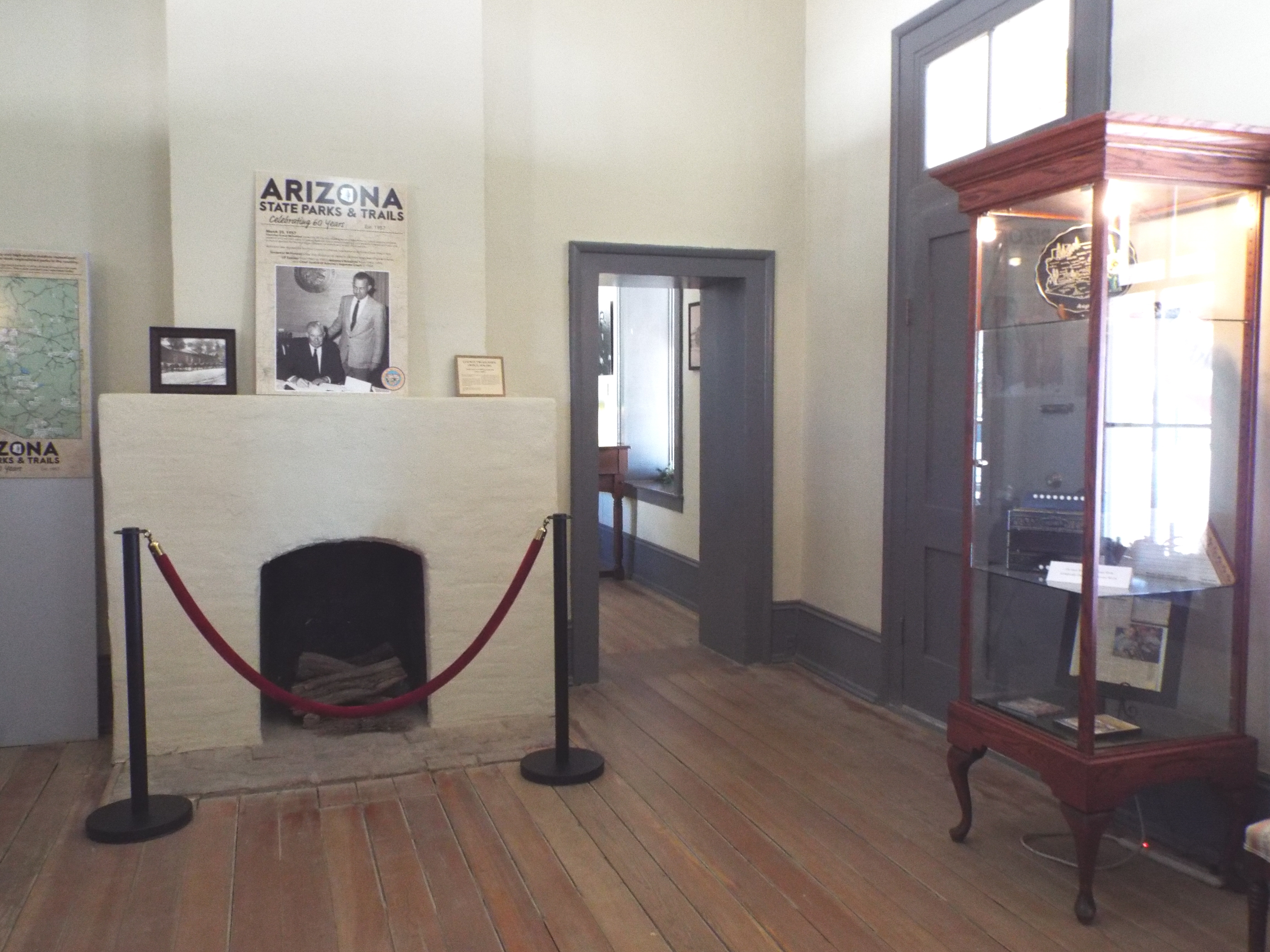
Fireplace in First Pinal County Courthouse

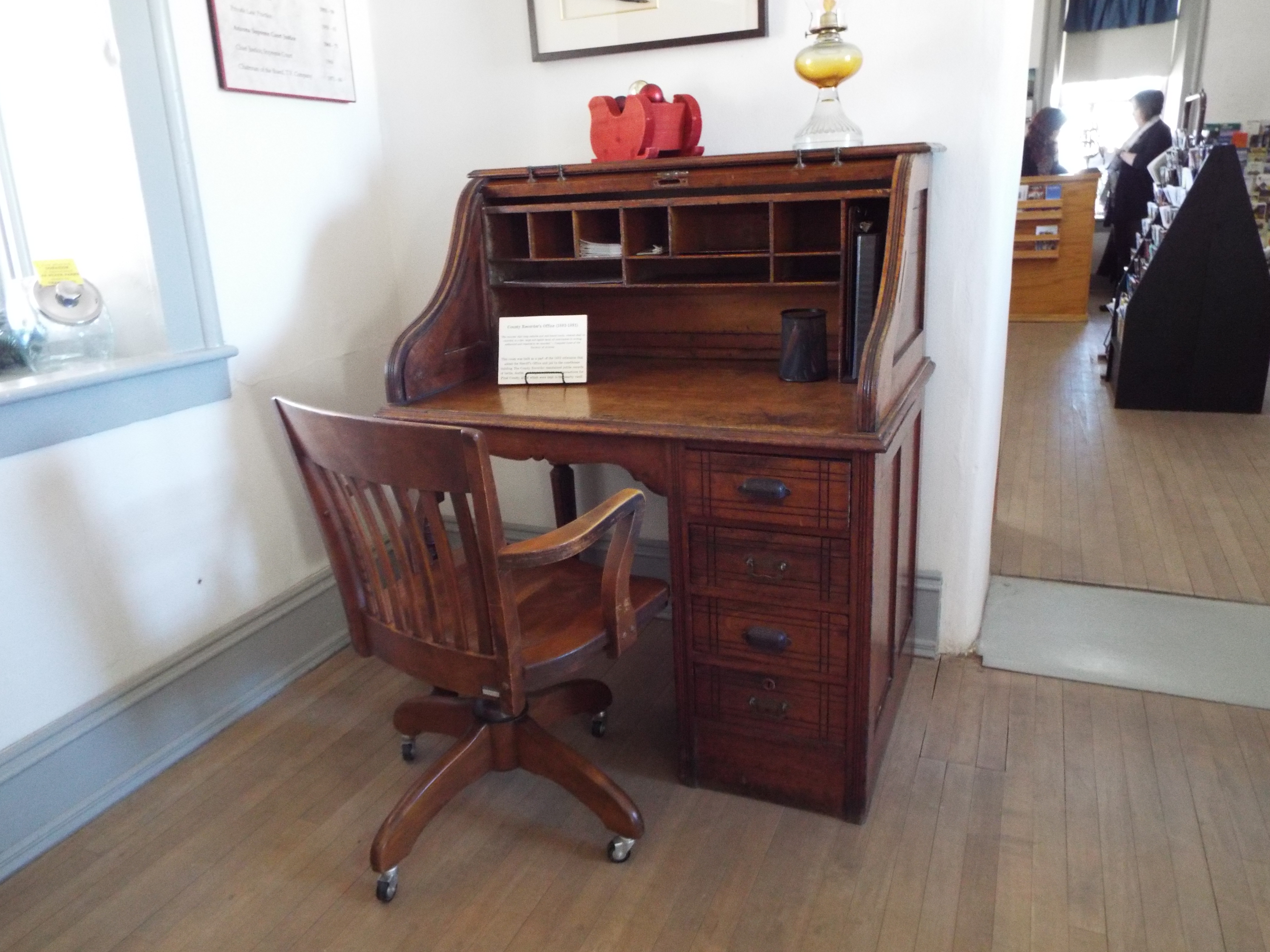
1878 County Recorders Office.

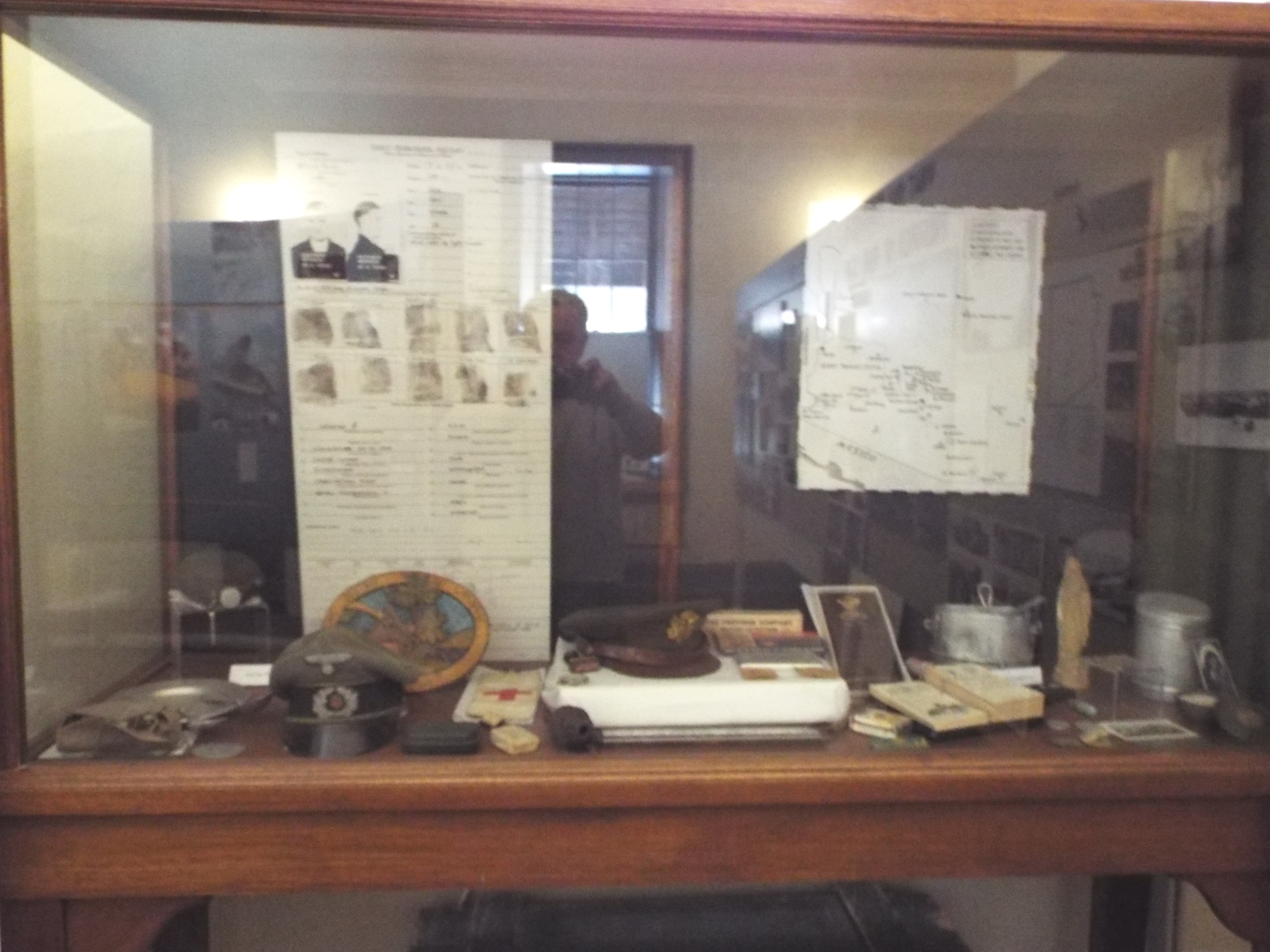
Display of Florence's German POW Camp artifacts.
