= Florence, Arizona =

Town in Pinal County, Arizona

Florence, Arizona O'odham: S-auppag
- Town
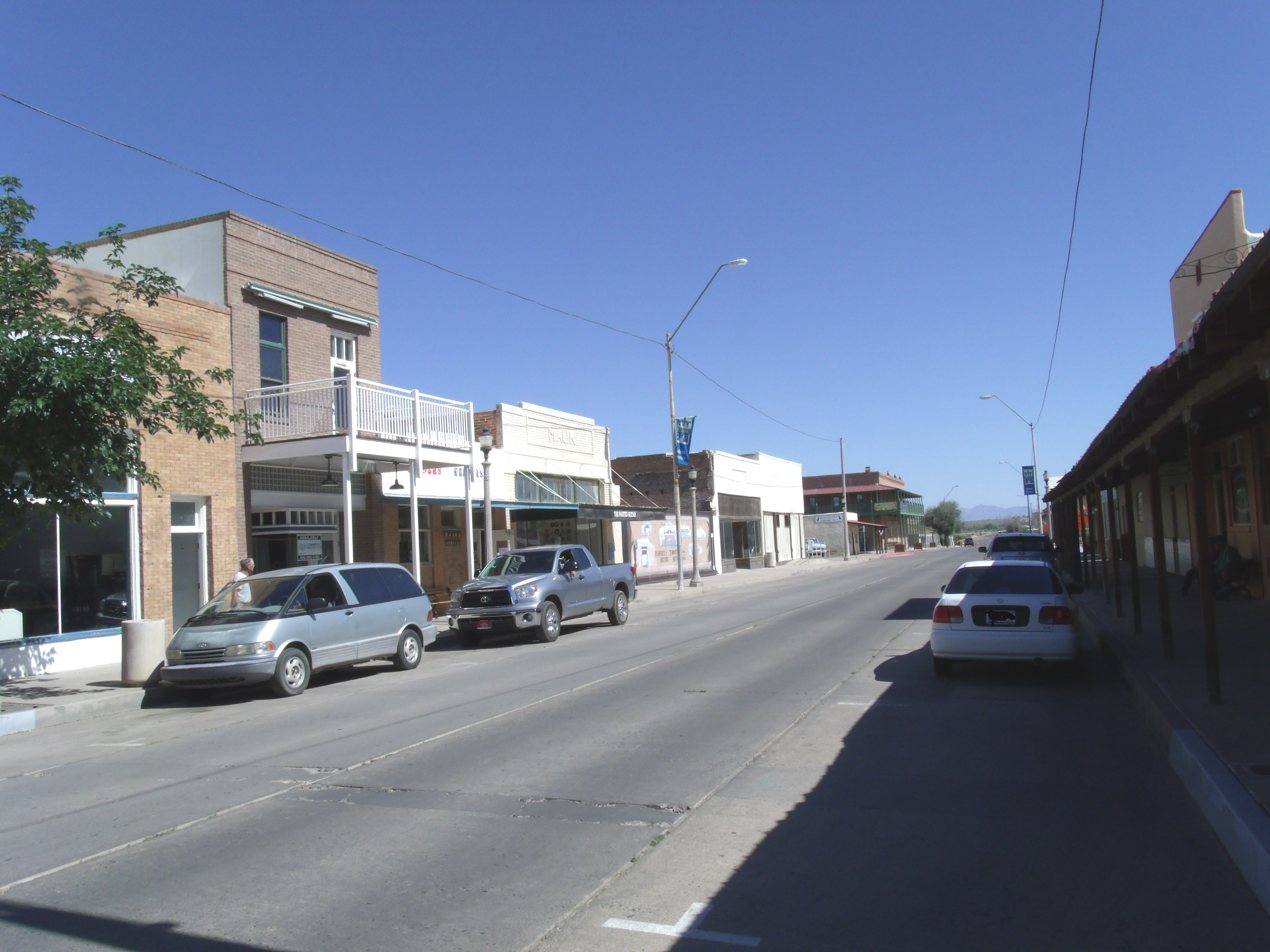
- Main Street of the original town-site of Florence. The town-site was listed in the National Register of Historic Places on October 26, 1982, reference #82001623.

- Flag Seal Logo

- Location of Florence in Pinal County, Arizona

- Location in Arizona Location in the United States
- Coordinates: 33°2′19″N 111°23′13″W
- Country: United States
- State: Arizona
- County: Pinal

Government
  - Mayor: Keith Eaton

Area
  - Total: 62.68 sq mi (162.33 km^{2})
  - Land: 62.64 sq mi (162.23 km^{2})
  - Water: 0.039 sq mi (0.10 km^{2})
- Elevation: 1,539 ft (469 m)

Population (2020)
  - Total: 26,785
  - Density: 427.6/sq mi (165.11/km^{2})
- Time zone: UTC-7 (MST (no DST))
- ZIP codes: 85128, 85132, 85179
- Area code: 520
- FIPS code: 04-23760
- GNIS feature ID: 2412633
- Website: http://www.florenceaz.gov/

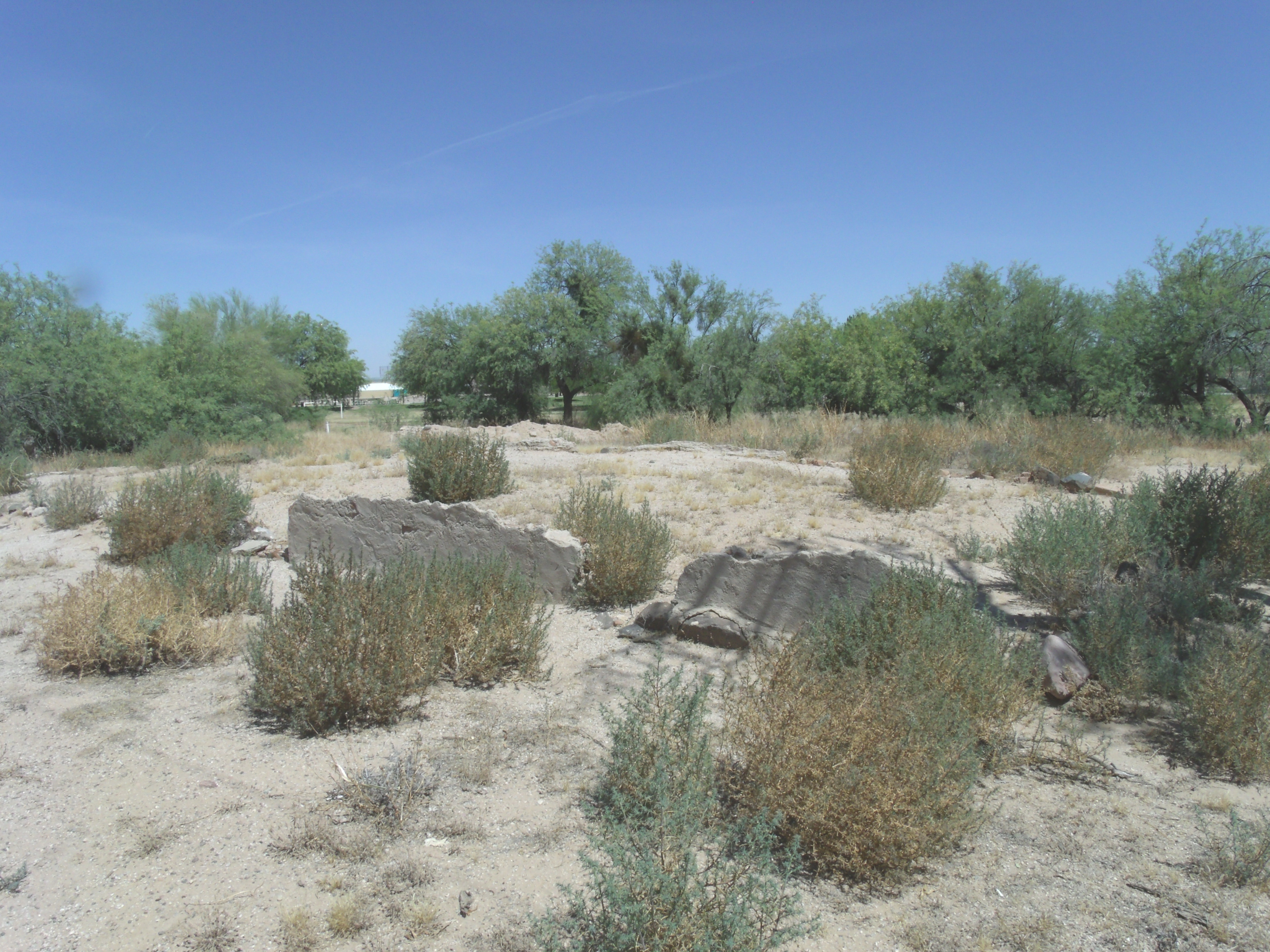
The Ruins of Levi Ruggles House. The house was built in 1866 and the ruins are located on Ruggles Street between Quartz and Willow streets.

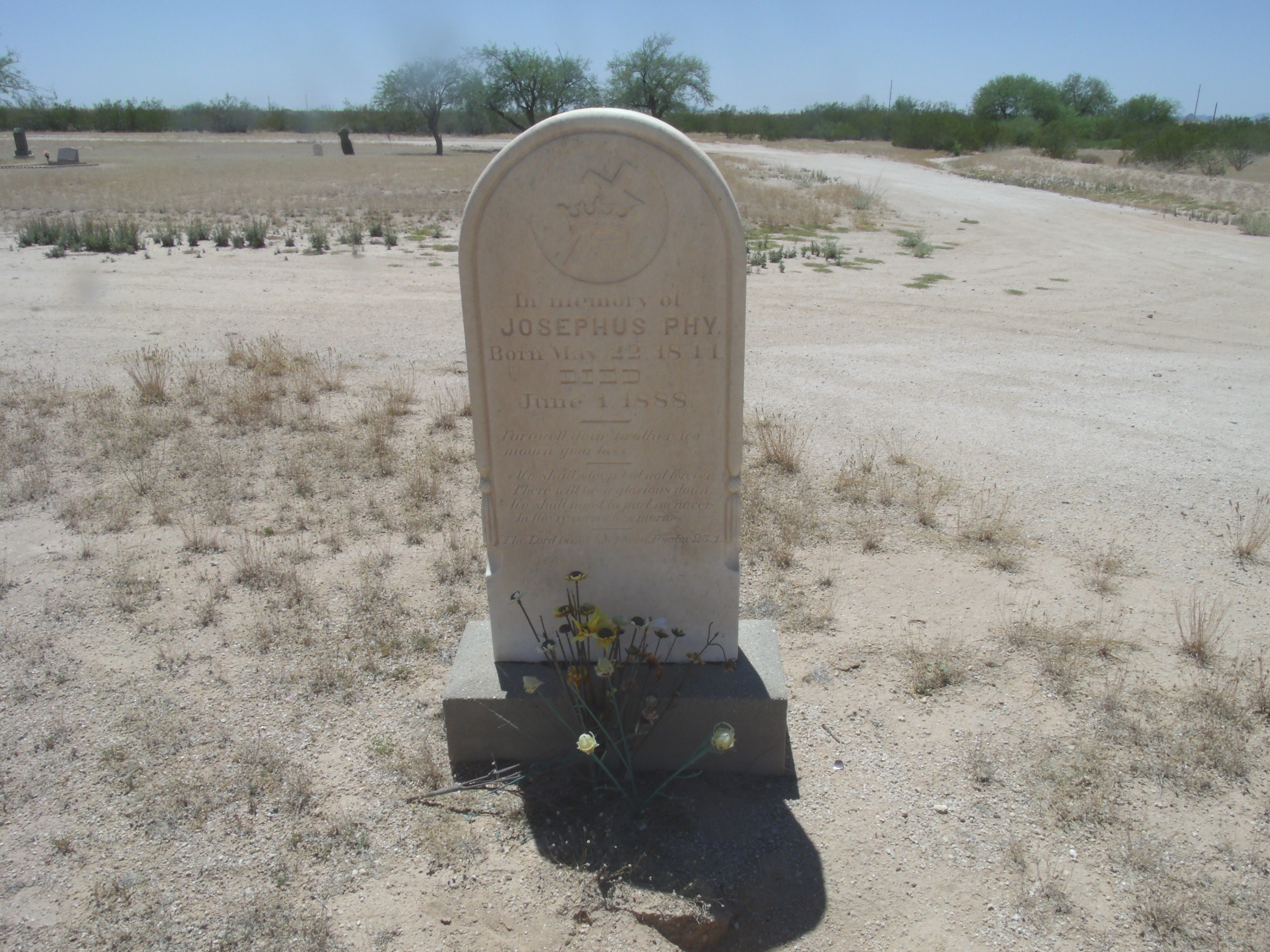
The Tombstone of Josephus "Joe" Phy

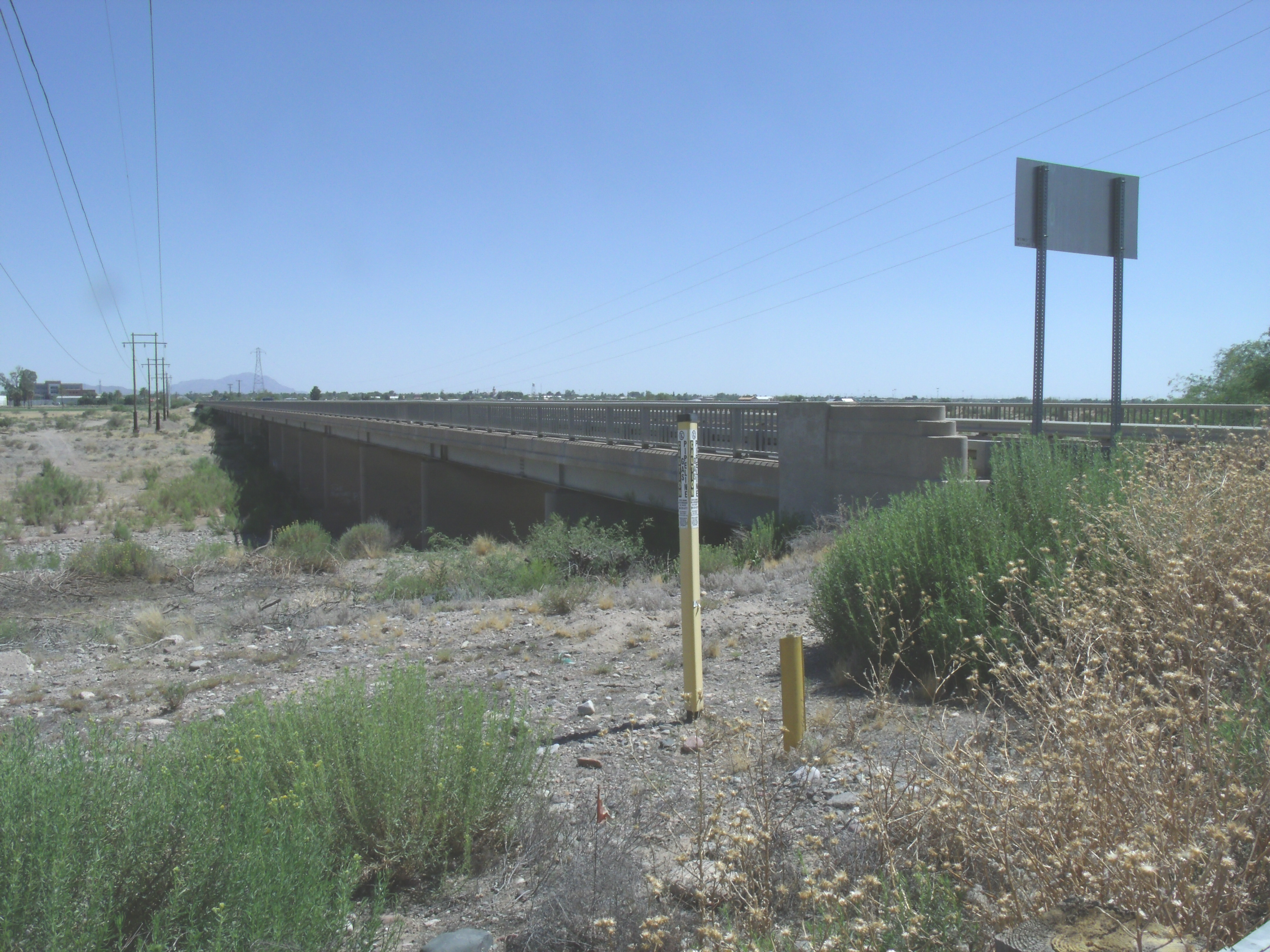
The historic Florence Bridge built in 1885 over the Gila River and rebuilt in 1909.

Florence (O'odham: S-auppag) is a town in Pinal County, Arizona, United States. Florence, which is the county seat of Pinal County, is one of the oldest towns in that county and includes a National Historic District with over 25 buildings listed on the National Register of Historic Places. The population of Florence was 26,785 at the 2020 census.

== History ==
The area where the town of Florence is located was once inhabited by the Hohokam, ancestors of the O'odham people. Prior to the establishment of the town, the Gila River served as a part of the border between the United States and Mexico. In 1853, the Gadsden Purchase extended American territory well south of the Gila.

Levi Ruggles, a veteran of the American Civil War, founded the town of Florence on the south bank of the Gila River. He came to Arizona Territory in 1866 as a U.S. Indian Agent. Recognizing the agricultural potential of the valley, he found an easily fordable crossing on the Gila River and surveyed a townsite there. With the aid of Governor R.C. McCormick, he secured a post office in August of the same year. Ruggles held numerous public offices including that of Territorial Legislator. Florence became the county seat in the newly formed Pinal County. Silver was discovered in 1875 in the nearby mountains which led to the creation of the famous Silver King Mine.

=== Adamsville ===
In 1870, Fred Adams founded a farming community two miles west of the original Florence townsite. The farming town had stores, homes, a post office, a flour mill, and water tanks, It was named Adamsville. In the 1900s (decade), the Gila River overflowed its banks after a storm. Most of the small town was wiped out and the residents moved to Florence. The area where the town was established became a ghost town within the boundaries of Florence. At the junction of Highway 79 and 287 there is a historical marker about Adamsville.

A canal was built in the 1880s which enabled water from the Gila River to be diverted for irrigation. Farming and ranching then played a major role in Florence's economy. All of the federal land transactions for Southern Arizona were conducted in Florence until 1881, when the Federal Land Office was moved to Tucson.

=== Tunnel Saloon Gabriel-Phy shootout of 1888 ===
One of the most notable gunfights in the Old Southwest occurred in Florence. Sheriff Pete Gabriel hired thirty-nine year old Joseph (Joe) Phy as his deputy in 1883. Gabriel decided to not run for sheriff in 1886 and supported his deputy Phy for the job. Later Gabriel withdrew his support because of personal differences with Phy. The two friends became bitter enemies and had a confrontation on May 31, 1888, in the Tunnel Saloon. A gunfight ensued and spread to the street. Both men received gunshot wounds. Phy died a few hours after the gunfight, but Gabriel survived the encounter and died 10 years later.

=== Second Pinal County Courthouse ===
The second Pinal County Courthouse was built in 1891. It was the site where the trials of three notorious women were presented. They were Pearl Hart, Eva Dugan and Winnie Ruth Judd, known as the "Trunk Murderess". Pearl Hart (birth surname: Taylor) was an outlaw of the American Old West. She committed one of the last recorded stagecoach robberies in the United States; her crime gained notoriety primarily because of her gender. She was tried in 1899 and was acquitted, however the judge ordered a second trial and she was found guilty and sentenced to five years in prison.

In the 1930s Eva Dugan was convicted of murder. She was sentenced to be executed by hanging. However, it resulted in her decapitation and influenced the State of Arizona to replace hanging with the gas chamber as a method of execution.

Winnie Ruth Judd was a Phoenix medical secretary who was found guilty of murdering and dismembering her friends Agnes Anne LeRoi and Hedvig Samuelson over the alleged affections of her lover Jack Halloran. The jury found her guilty of first-degree murder on February 8, 1932. An appeal was unsuccessful. Her trial was marked by sensationalized newspaper coverage and suspicious circumstances. Judd was sentenced to be hanged February 17, 1933, and sent to the Arizona State Prison in Florence. The sentence she received raised debate about capital punishment. Her death sentence was overturned after a ten-day hearing found her mentally incompetent; she was then sent to Arizona State Asylum for the Insane on April 24, 1933.

=== Tom Mix Monument ===
In 1940, the cowboy movie star Tom Mix was killed when he lost control of his speeding Cord Phaeton convertible and rolled into a dry wash (now called the Tom Mix Wash) in Florence, Arizona. Mix, who was a regular tenant in the Ross/Fryer–Cushman House, was returning to Florence from Tucson. There is a 2-foot–tall iron statue of a riderless horse with a plaque on the site of the accident.

== Geography and climate ==
Florence is located at 33°2′32″N 111°23′4″W (33.042204, −111.384521).

According to the United States Census Bureau, the town has a total area of 8.3 square miles (21 km^{2}), all land, situated in the lower Sonoran Desert. The town has the typical hot desert climate of lowland Arizona, with sweltering hot summers and mild winters. Like most of Arizona, Florence receives half of its average summer rainfall in the months of July, August, and September, during the North American monsoon season, with August being the wettest month. Thunderstorms occur in the late afternoon to evening hours, as well as the early night hours, bringing heavy downpours, thunder, lightning, blowing dust, and the risk of flash flooding. The winter months of December, January, and February bring the other half of the yearly rainfall to the town from winter storms that move in from the Pacific Ocean. December is the second wettest month in Florence.

Climate data for Florence, Arizona (1971 to 2000)
Month	Jan	Feb	Mar	Apr	May	Jun	Jul	Aug	Sep	Oct	Nov	Dec	Year
Record high °F (°C)	89 (32)	92 (33)	99 (37)	105 (41)	115 (46)	118 (48)	119 (48)	118 (48)	117 (47)	112 (44)	97 (36)	91 (33)	119 (48)
Mean daily maximum °F (°C)	66.3 (19.1)	70.4 (21.3)	74.5 (23.6)	82.6 (28.1)	91.2 (32.9)	100.8 (38.2)	102.4 (39.1)	100.8 (38.2)	96.8 (36.0)	86.9 (30.5)	74.3 (23.5)	66.1 (18.9)	84.4 (29.1)
Mean daily minimum °F (°C)	38.3 (3.5)	40.8 (4.9)	44.3 (6.8)	49.8 (9.9)	58.3 (14.6)	67.3 (19.6)	75.5 (24.2)	74.6 (23.7)	68.5 (20.3)	56.9 (13.8)	44.3 (6.8)	38.6 (3.7)	54.8 (12.7)
Record low °F (°C)	11 (−12)	18 (−8)	20 (−7)	23 (−5)	32 (0)	35 (2)	54 (12)	50 (10)	41 (5)	30 (−1)	14 (−10)	16 (−9)	11 (−12)
Average rainfall inches (mm)	1.07 (27)	1.06 (27)	1.16 (29)	0.41 (10)	0.26 (6.6)	0.17 (4.3)	0.93 (24)	1.22 (31)	0.90 (23)	0.90 (23)	0.75 (19)	1.22 (31)	10.05 (254.9)
Average rainy days (≥ 0.01 inch)	4.7	4.5	4.2	1.9	1.5	0.7	3.5	4.8	2.7	2.9	2.7	3.4	37.5
Source: National Climatic Data Center

== Demographics ==
Historical population
Census	Pop.	Note	%±
1880	902		—
1890	1,486		64.7%
1910	807		—
1920	1,161		43.9%
1930	1,318		13.5%
1940	1,383		4.9%
1950	1,776		28.4%
1960	2,143		20.7%
1970	2,173		1.4%
1980	3,391		56.1%
1990	7,510		121.5%
2000	17,054		127.1%
2010	25,536		49.7%
2020	26,785		4.9%
2022 (est.)	24,795	▼	−7.4%
U.S. Decennial Census

=== Racial and ethnic composition ===
Racial Makeup
Race (NH = Non-Hispanic)	% 2020	% 2010	% 2000	Pop. 2020	Pop. 2010	Pop. 2000
White Alone (NH)	53.4%	46.6%	49.7%	14,305	11,911	8,478
Black Alone (NH)	7.4%	6.1%	8.9%	1,988	1,545	1,524
American Indian Alone (NH)	4.3%	14%	4.1%	1,149	3,571	692
Asian Alone (NH)	0.9%	0.9%	0.8%	229	218	136
Pacific Islander Alone (NH)	0.1%	0.1%	0%	36	19	6
Other Race Alone (NH)	0.2%	0.1%	0.3%	45	18	49
Multiracial (NH)	4.2%	1.1%	0.8%	1,132	276	128
Hispanic (Any race)	29.5%	31.2%	35.4%	7,901	7,978	6,041

=== 2020 census ===
As of the 2020 census, Florence had 26,785 residents. The median age was 40.9 years; 8.2% of residents were under the age of 18 and 18.7% were age 65 or older. For every 100 females, there were 321.9 males, and for every 100 females age 18 and over, there were 365.6 males age 18 and over.

76.4% of residents lived in urban areas and 23.6% lived in rural areas.

There were 4,866 households in Florence, of which 20.6% had children under the age of 18 living in them. Of all households, 58.5% were married-couple households, 12.8% were households with a male householder and no spouse or partner present, and 22.7% were households with a female householder and no spouse or partner present. About 24.4% of all households were made up of individuals and 16.1% had someone living alone who was 65 years of age or older.

There were 6,463 housing units, of which 24.7% were vacant. The homeowner vacancy rate was 3.7% and the rental vacancy rate was 11.8%.

=== Demographic estimates ===
In 2015 ACS 5-year estimates, 33.6% of households were non-families. The average household size was 2.48 and the average family size was 3.06.

=== Income and poverty ===
The median income for a household in the town was $47,891. About 12.3% of families and 16.8% of the population were below the poverty line, including 24.7% of those under age 18 and 10.6% of those age 65 or over.

== Prisons ==
In 1909, the Yuma Territorial Prison (memorialized in the movie '3:10 to Yuma') was closed and the inmates relocated to the new Florence Territorial Prison.

As of 2016 Florence is home to multiple state, federal, county and private prisons:

- Arizona State Prison Complex – Florence, run by the Arizona Department of Corrections, housing Arizona state prisoners, the former Arizona State Prison, and location of Arizona's execution chamber
- Arizona State Prison Complex – Eyman, run by the Arizona Department of Corrections, housing Arizona state prisoners and Arizona's death row
- Arizona State Prison Florence-West, operated by the GEO Group, housing Arizona state prisoners
- Central Arizona Correctional Facility, operated by the GEO Group, housing Arizona state prisoners
- Central Arizona Detention Center, run by Corrections Corporation of America, housing prisoners for the United States Marshals Service, TransCor America LLC, U.S. Immigration and Customs Enforcement, Pascua Yaqui Tribe government, and the United States Air Force
- Florence Correctional Center, run by CCA, houses inmates for U.S. Immigration and Customs Enforcement, for the Vermont Department of Corrections, and for the United States Marshals Service.
- The Pinal County Adult Detention Center, operated by the county, housing local prisoners
- The Pinal County Youth Justice Center, operated by the county, housing local juvenile prisoners

Located just north of Florence during World War II was a large prisoner of war camp for German and Italian prisoners of war, mainly captured during the North Africa campaign, called Camp Florence on 500 acres of land. Japanese Americans arrested as "enemy aliens" after the U.S. entered the war, were also interned nearby at the Gila River War Relocation Center. The prisoners were paid 50 cents an hour to pick cotton. The men were not allowed to buy cigarettes with their prison wages. However, they could buy tobacco which they rolled themselves. McFarland State Historic Park on Ruggles Ave. has a display and information on this period of Arizona history.

== Transportation ==
The City of Coolidge operates Central Arizona Regional Transit (CART), which provides transportation between Florence, Coolidge, Central Arizona College and Casa Grande.

Florence is served by Arizona State Route 79 and Arizona State Route 287.

Copper Basin Railway provides freight rail service to Florence.

== Miscellaneous ==
Florence is considered the hub of Pinal County filled with historic buildings and rich history.

- Florence is the location of the 2nd Anthem development in the state of Arizona being built by Pulte and Del Webb. It is located six miles to the northwest of downtown historic Florence.
- The town's preserved Main Street and open desert scenery were the setting of the motion picture Murphy's Romance.
- Florence is the host of the annual "Country Thunder" music festival.
- The town is also the home of the Florence Jr. Parada Rodeo, the oldest junior rodeo in the United States.
- Florence is considered to be the hometown of Adolfo “Harpo” Celaya, a World War II veteran who is one of the USS Indianapolis survivors. In 2017 Celaya was honored as the Florence Post Office was dedicated in his name.

== Points of interest ==
- McFarland State Historic Park – The first Pinal County Courthouse was built in 1876 and is located at W. 24 Ruggle St. in the McFarland State Historic Park.
- St. Anthony's Greek Orthodox Monastery was established in 1995 by Elder Ephraim of Arizona, a Greek Orthodox priest and monk.
- Florence High School – The high school was built in 1887 and is located in 1000 S. Main St. Listed in the National Register of Historic Places on June 22, 1987, reference #87001306.
- Poston Butte – The pyramid tomb of Charles Debrille Poston, known as "The Father of Arizona" is located on Primrose Hill which was renamed Poston Butte.
Points of interest
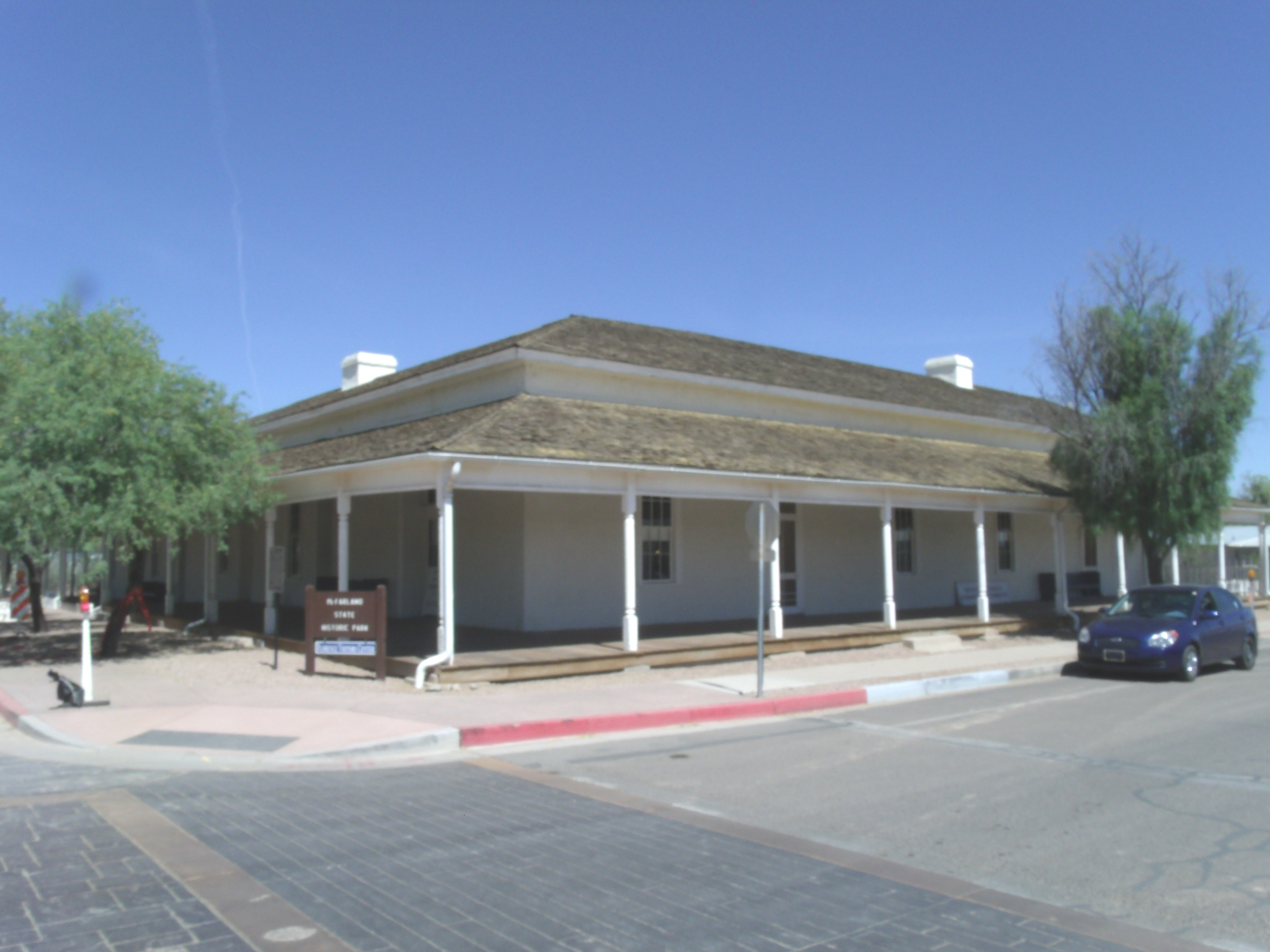
The first Pinal County Courthouse was built in 1876.

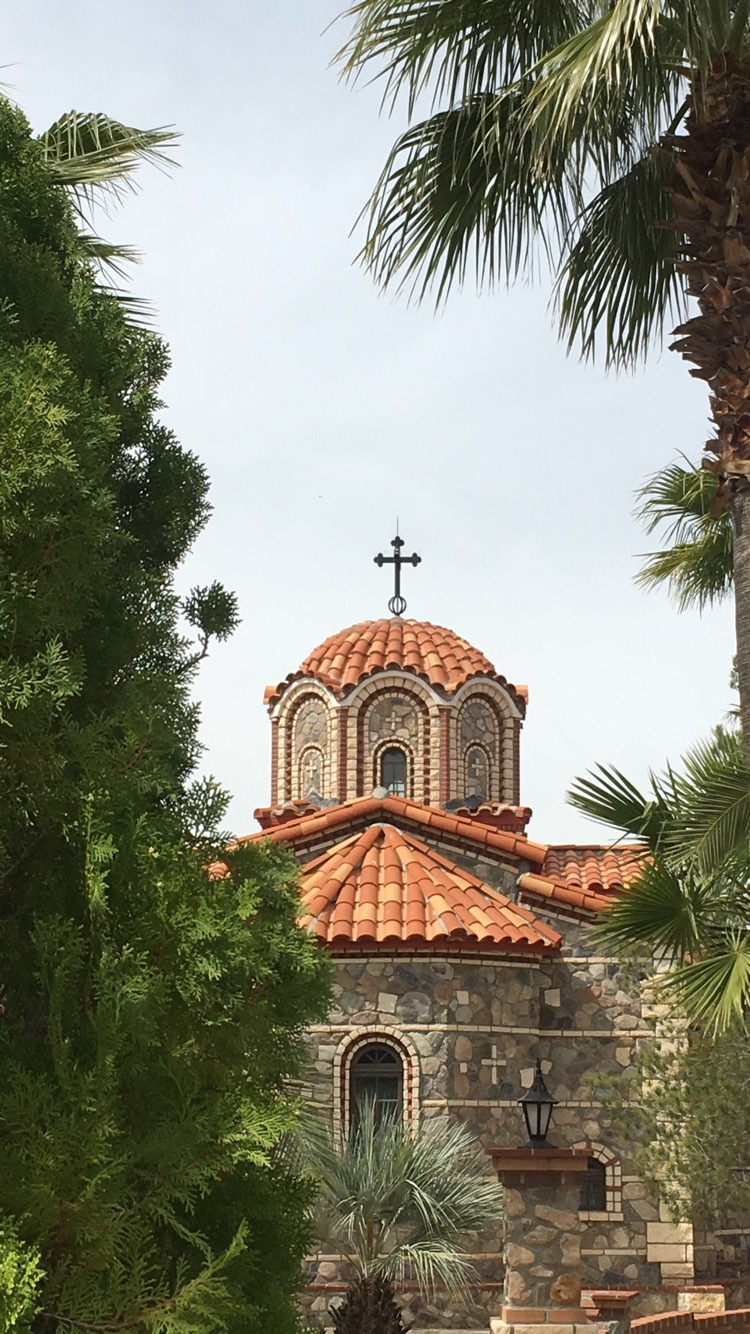
St. Anthony's Greek Orthodox Monastery

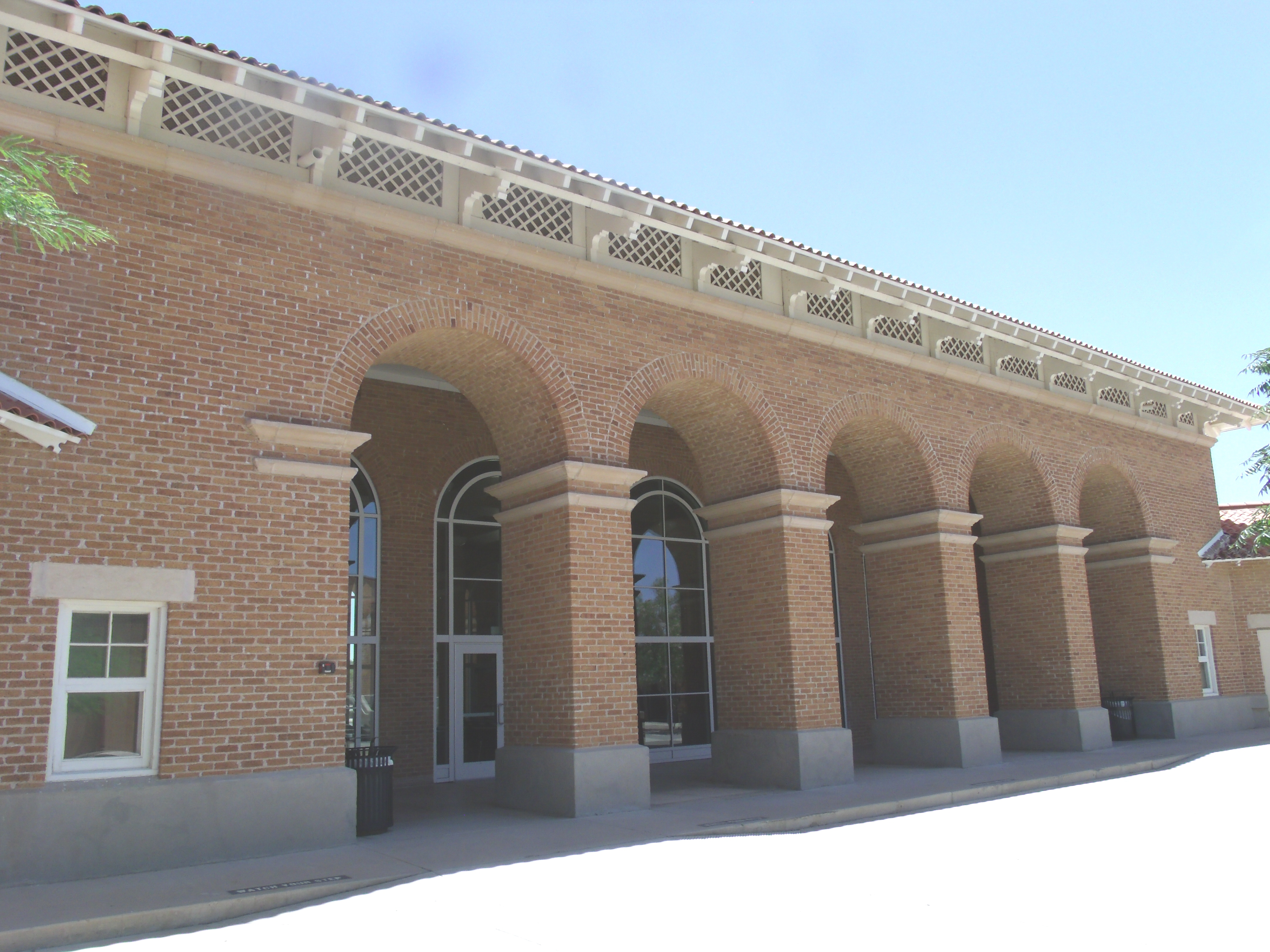
Florence High School.

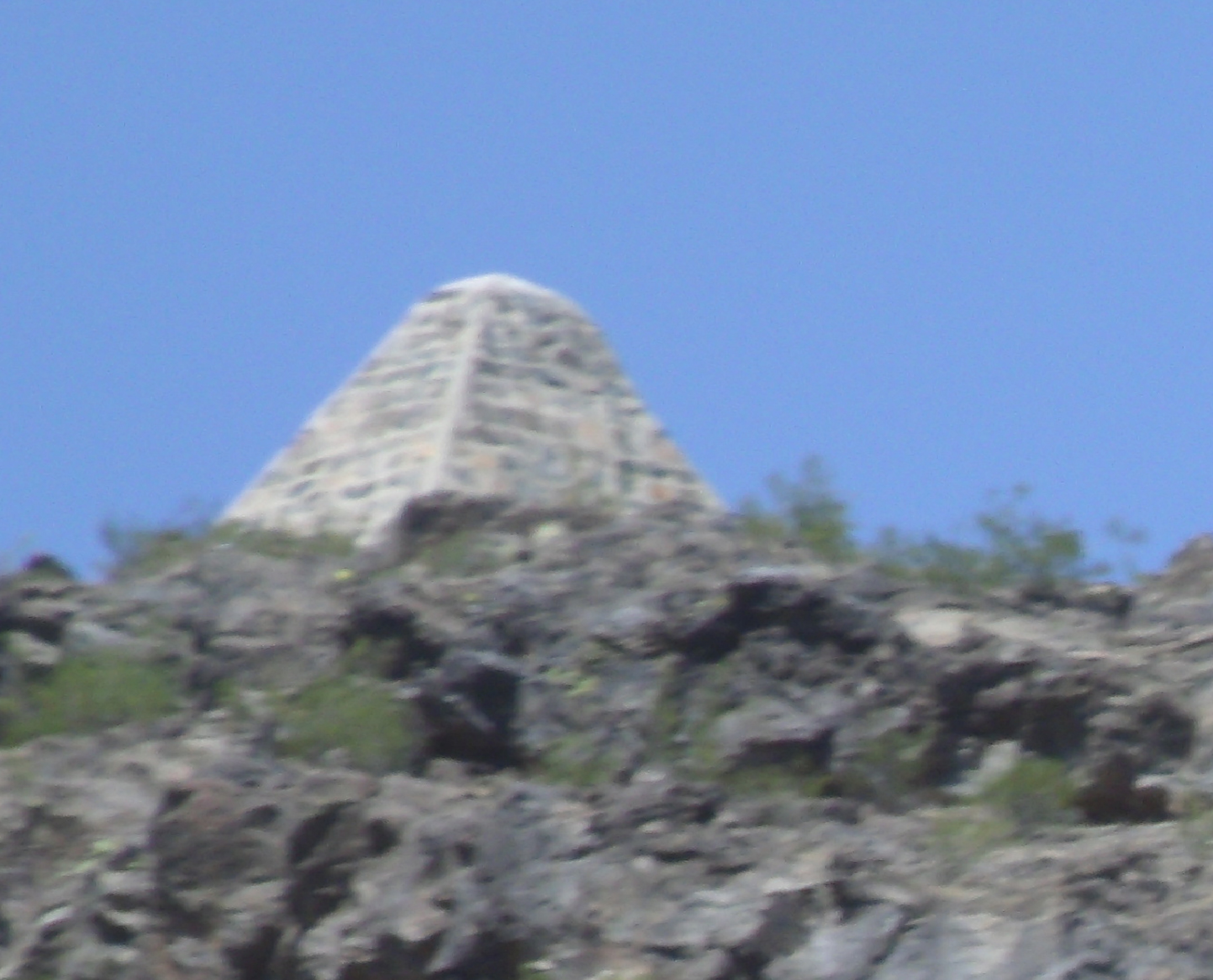
Pyramid tomb of Charles Debrille Poston.

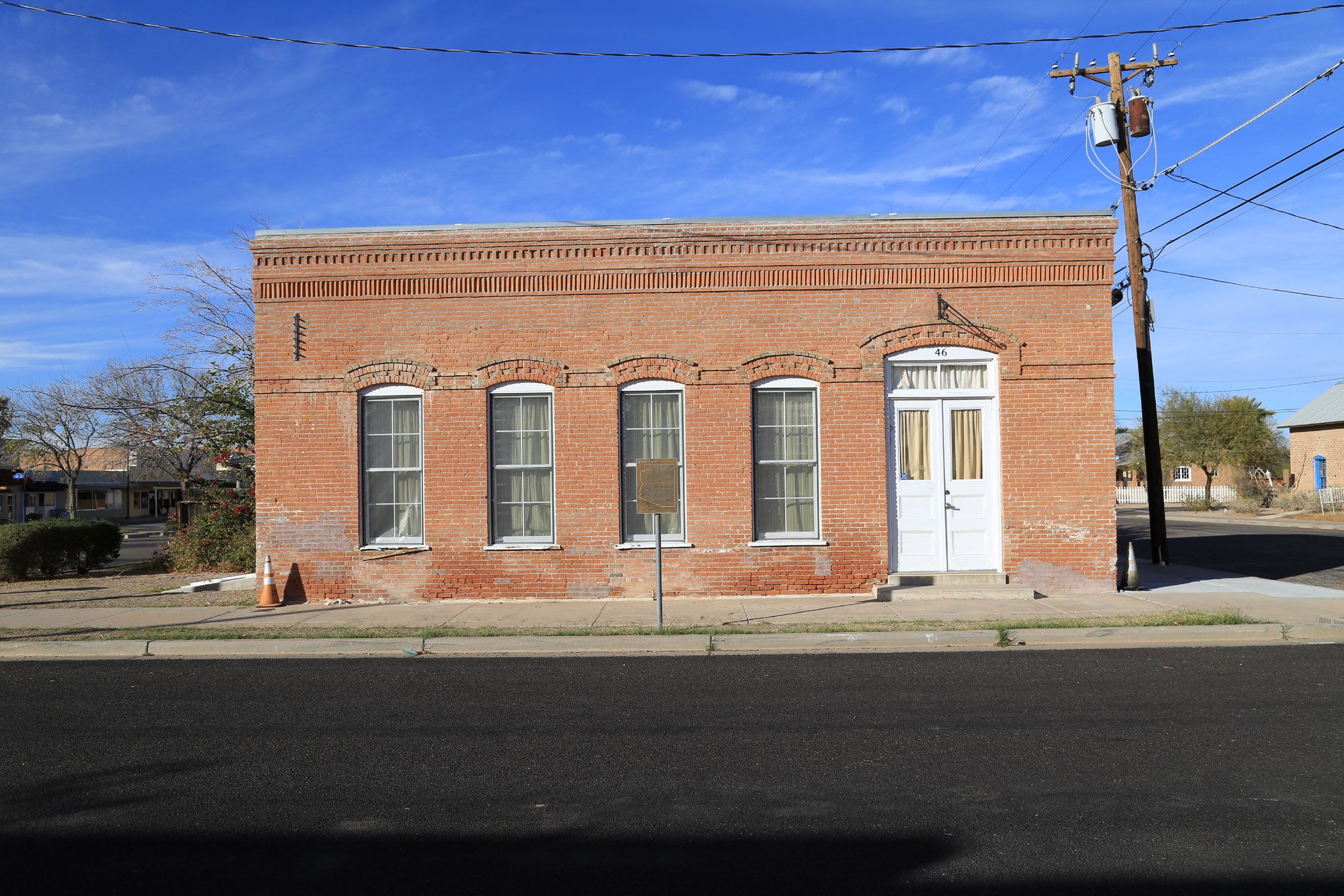
John Nicholas Saloon and Beer Hall, Florence

== Historic properties ==
Florence has various historic structures. Some are listed in the National Register of Historic Places while others are considered historical by the Florence Historic District Advisory Commission.
