= Eva Dugan =

American murderer (1878–1930)

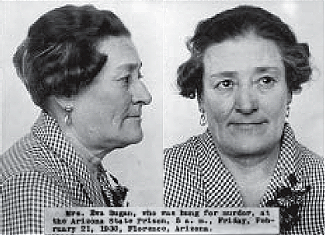
- Pima County Sheriff's Department: inmate mugshot on day of execution
- Born: 1878; Salisbury, Missouri, U.S.
- Died: February 21, 1930 (aged 51–52); Florence State Prison, Arizona, U.S.
- Status: Executed by hanging
- Convictions: First degree murder Motor vehicle theft
- Penalty: Death

Eva Dugan (1878 – February 21, 1930) was a convicted murderer whose execution by hanging at the state prison in Florence, Arizona, resulted in her decapitation and influenced the state of Arizona to replace hanging with the lethal gas chamber as a method of execution.

== Early life ==
Born in Salisbury, Missouri, in 1878, Dugan later married and had two children (a son and a daughter) but her husband abandoned the family, leaving them destitute. Dugan relocated to Juneau, Territory of Alaska, after trekking north during the Klondike Gold Rush of 1896–1899, and became a cabaret singer and worked as a prostitute to support herself and her children. Many years later, she moved to Pima County, Arizona, where she worked for an elderly chicken rancher, Andrew J. Mathis, as a housekeeper.

== Crime ==
Dugan became a live-in housekeeper of Andrew J. Mathis, wealthy owner of a chicken ranch. Very quickly the employer/employee relationship became cantankerous. The two often bickered with each other because Mathis hated Dugan's cooking and was not satisfied with her work and Mathis was demanding, abrasive and difficult to get along with. Mathis fired Dugan and told her to leave his property by morning. The next morning, January 27, 1927, Mathis disappeared, as did some of his possessions, his Dodge coupe automobile, and his cash box. Neighbors reported that Dugan had tried to sell some of his possessions before she disappeared as well.

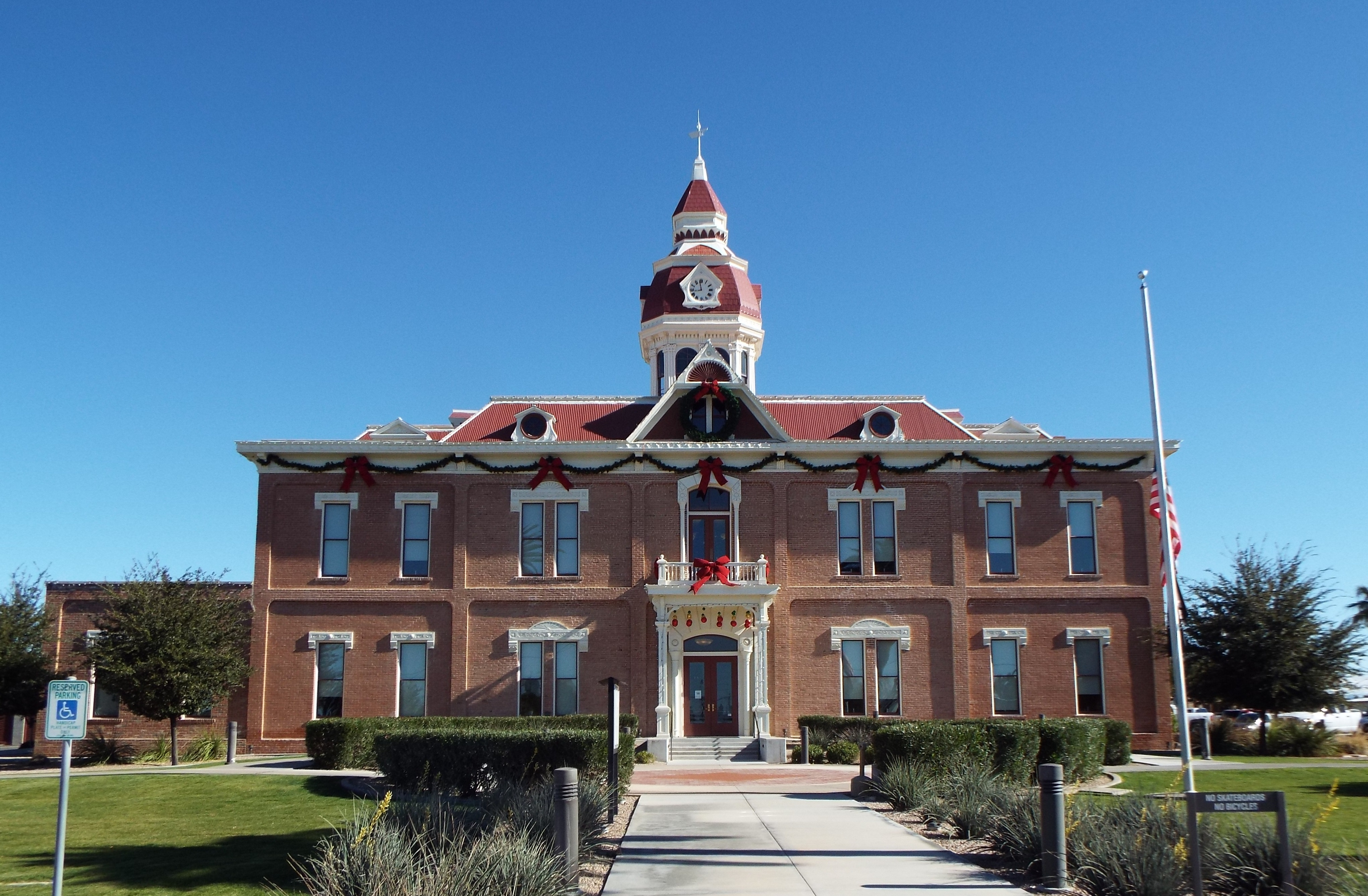
The trial of Eva Dugan was held in the Second Pinal County Courthouse in Florence.

The police discovered Dugan had a father in California and a daughter in White Plains, New York. Though Dugan refused to give information about the identity of either of her children, police only found her daughter, leaving the identity of her son a secret. She had been married five times. One of her spouses had left her for another woman, while the other four had mysteriously disappeared. She sold the Dodge coupe for $600 in Kansas City, Missouri. She was arrested in White Plains when a postal clerk, alerted by the police, intercepted a postcard to her from her father in California. She was extradited to Arizona to face automobile theft charges. She was found guilty and sentenced to nine months in prison.

== Trial ==
Nine months later in October of the same year, a camper found Mathis' decomposed remains on his ranch. Dugan was tried for murder in a short trial based mostly on circumstantial evidence. During her testimony, Dugan said that Mathis believed that she had poisoned his breakfast food, but she claimed that he ate rotten meat in the form of a rabbit that had boils on it. Dugan also admitted that she had sex with Mathis on a weekly basis and performed prostitution at the ranch. According to her, if Mathis "saw any of the men on the street [in Tucson] that he thought was all right he would call them off and tell them to come on out to the house." She would perform sex acts for three dollars and give Mathis fifty cents from each transaction.

Dugan claimed that "Jack", a teenage boy who had come to the ranch for work, had accidentally killed Mathis with a retaliatory punch after Mathis beat him for refusing to milk a cow. According to her, Jack came to the house to tell her what he had done, and she and Jack both attempted to revive Mathis with mouth-to-mouth resuscitation after removing his false teeth. When that failed to revive him, they loaded the body into the coupe, and Jack drove it out alone to dump it and came back at five o'clock in the morning.

The prosecution proved to the jury's satisfaction that Dugan had murdered Mathis with an axe. After her conviction, in her final statement, she told the jurors, "Well, I'll die with my boots on, an' in full health. An' that's more'n most of you old coots'll be able to boast on." She remained defiant to the end.

== Imprisonment ==
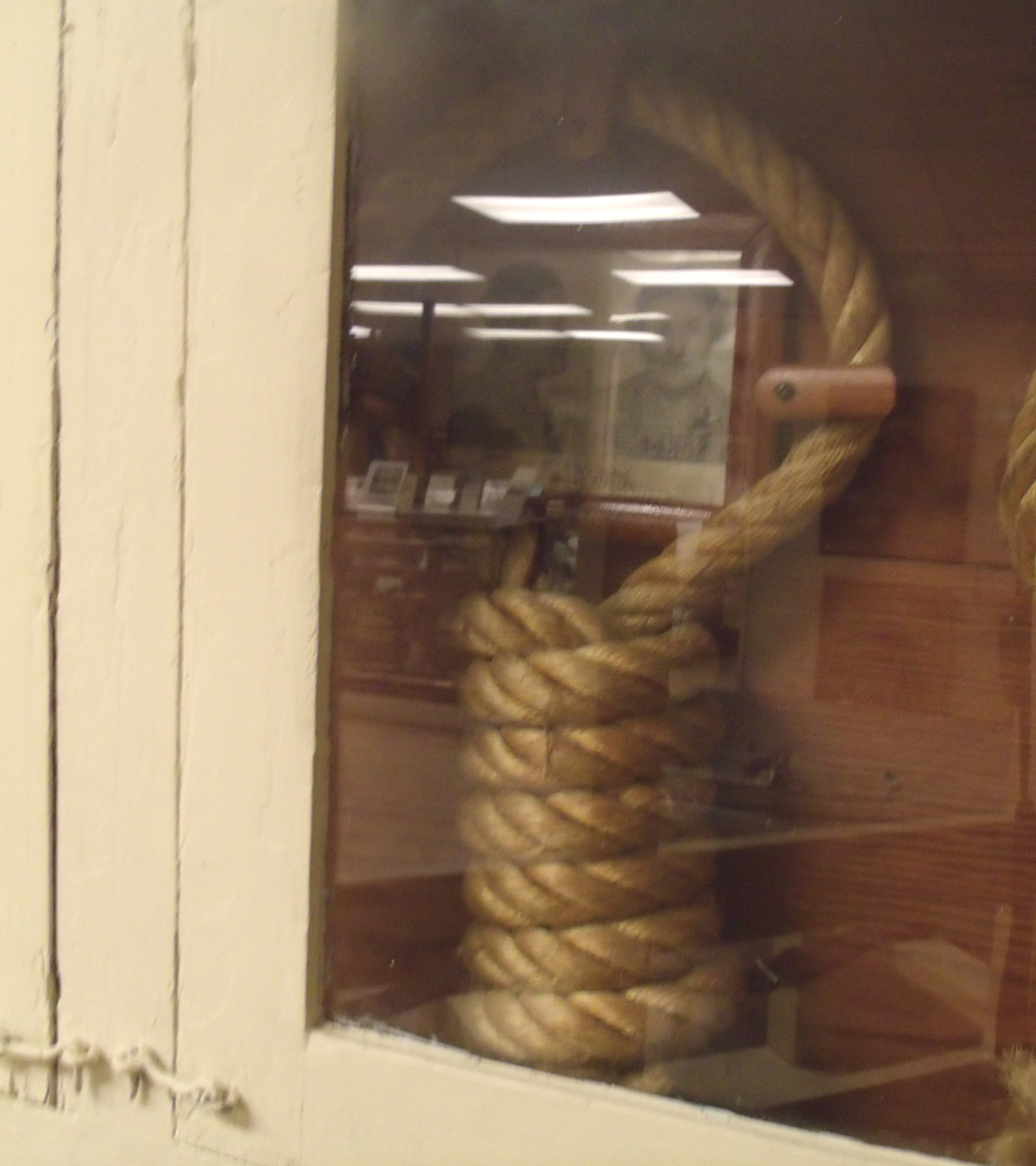
The noose that was used to hang Dugan on February 21, 1930, in exhibit at the Pinal County Historic Society & Museum in Florence, Arizona

To pay for her own coffin, Dugan gave interviews to the press for $1.00 each and sold embroidered handkerchiefs that she knitted while she was imprisoned. She also made for her hanging a silk, beaded "jazz dress", but later relented and wore a cheap dress as she was worried that her silk wrapper "might get mussed". She remained so upbeat that Time magazine called her "Cheerful Eva" in a March 3, 1930 story about her execution.

== Execution ==
The day before the hanging, there were rumors she planned to kill herself first. Her cell was searched, and a bottle of raw ammonia and three razor blades hidden in a dress were confiscated.

Dugan's appeal for clemency on the grounds of mental illness was denied, and she was taken to the gallows at 5 a.m. on February 21, 1930. She was the first woman to be executed by the state, and it was the first execution in Arizona history that allowed women to be witnesses.

She cooked her own last meal in her cell and played cards with other inmates until almost midnight. She preferred not to be buried in the State standard issued coffin and so she bought her own more elaborate coffin by way of selling bead work and collecting 50 cents from each of her visitors.

According to a newspaper account, Dugan was composed as she mounted the gallows. She told the guards, "Don't hold my arms so tight, the people will think I'm afraid." She swayed slightly when the noose was put around her neck and shook her head in the negative when she was asked if she had any final words.

The trap was sprung at 5:11. At the end of the drop, the snap of the rope decapitated her and sent her head rolling to a stop at the feet of the spectators. Her heart continued to pump blood out of her severed neck, spurting blood for several minutes after the decapitation. The grisly scene caused five witnesses (two women and three men) to faint. Dugan was one of the last persons to be hanged by Arizona. There were only three more hangings: Refugio Macias on March 7, 1930, Herbert Young on August 21, 1931, and Earl Gardner, who was hanged by federal government on July 12, 1936.

The gallows were replaced in Arizona by the gas chamber in 1934 and lethal injection in 1993. As of February 2024, Dugan is the only woman ever executed by Arizona.

== See also ==
- List of botched executions
