= List of historic properties in Casa Grande, Arizona =

- Town
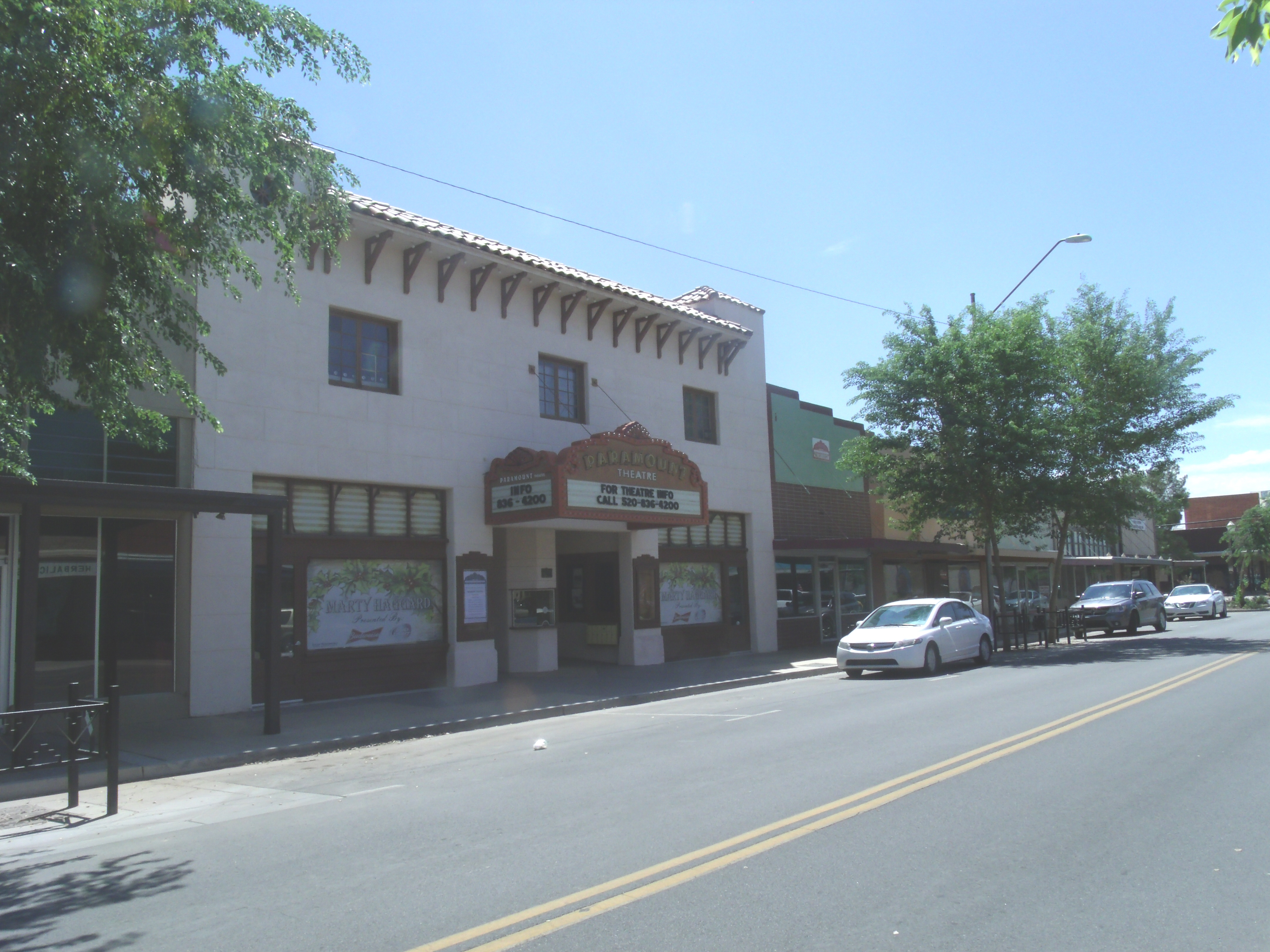
- View of Florence Street in Old Casa Grande

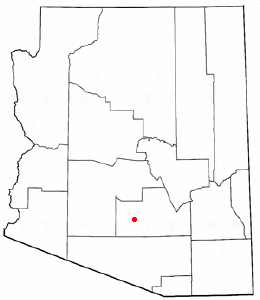
- Location in Pinal County and the state of Arizona

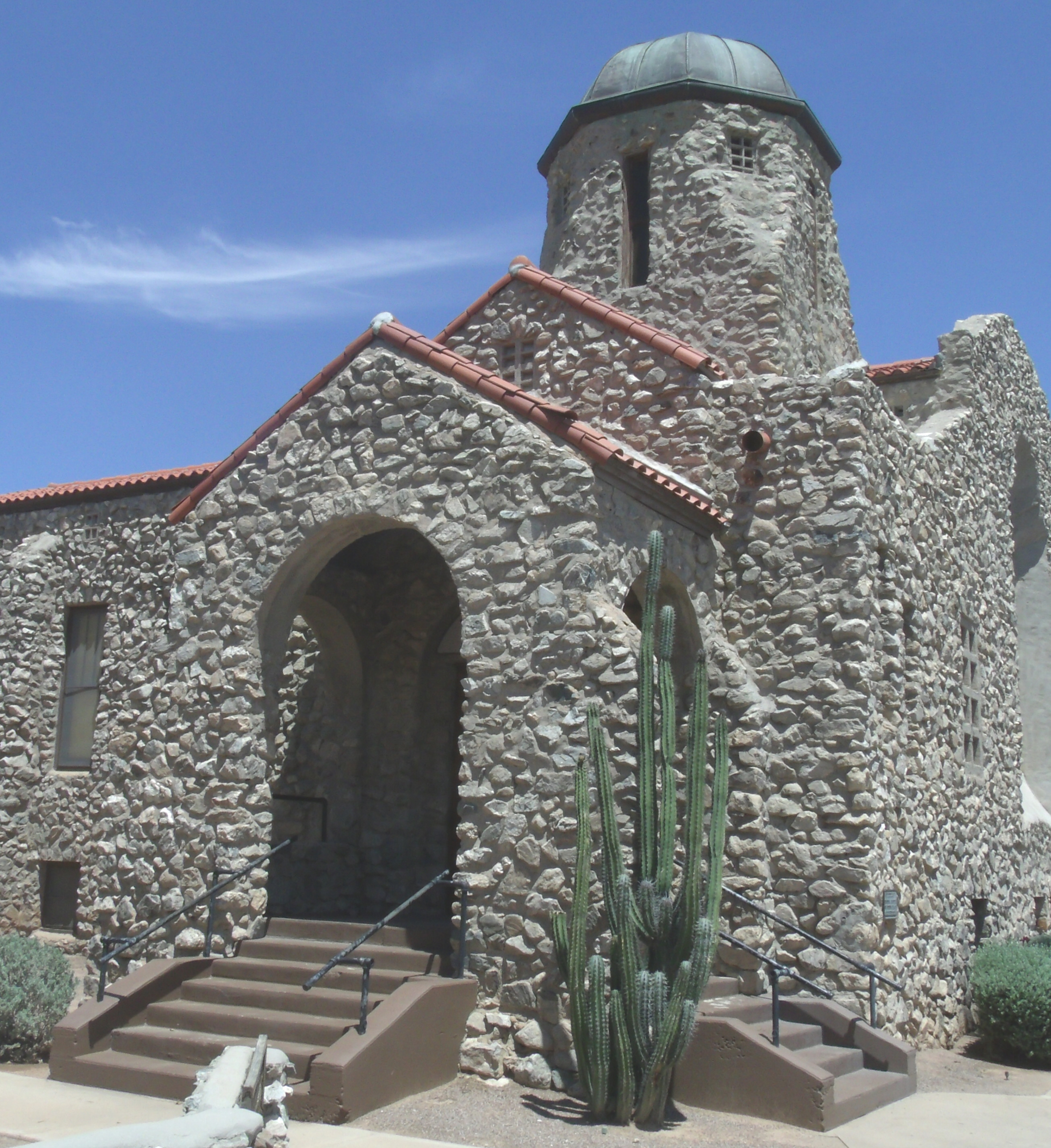
Close up view of the Casa Grande Stone Church

This is a list, which includes a photographic gallery, of some of the remaining historic properties in the town of Casa Grande, Arizona. Some of the structures in the list were made of fieldstone by local stonemason Michael Sullivan. Many of the historic structures in this list are listed either in the National Register of Historic Places (NRHP) or the Casa Grande Historic Register.

Also listed are two of the Corona Satellite Calibration Targets built in the 1960s in the desolate desert, in and around Casa Grande that helped to calibrate satellites of the Corona spy satellite program.

Included are the images of the Casa Grande Domes which were built in the 1970s for a computer manufacturing company, but were never completed. The Domes, some of which resemble flying saucers and giant caterpillars, are in a state of abandonment. The Domes were featured in Season 11, Episode 9 of the Travel Channel series "Ghost Adventures"

== Brief history ==
Casa Grande (Spanish for big house) is a city in Pinal County, which was founded in 1879 during the Arizona mining boom. Initially called Terminus it was an outpost and the end of the Railroad line for a while. Then. was named after the Casa Grande Ruins National Monument, which is actually located in Coolidge. The presence of the Southern Pacific Railroad contributed to the growth of the town.

The Casa Grande Valley Historical Society was founded in 1964 to preserve and exhibit the history of the Casa Grande region. The city has numerous historic properties which have been listed either in the National Register of Historic Places (NRHP) or have been identified as historical by the Casa Grande Historic Preservation Program. The Historic Preservation Office works together with the Historic Preservation. They determine which properties meet the criteria for inclusion in the Casa Grande Historic Property Register. However, the preservation office does not have the ability to deny a demolition permit. Therefore, owners of a property listed in the National Historic Property Register may demolish the historical property. Among the properties which are listed in the NRHP and which have been demolished are the following:

- The John C. Loss House which was built in 1880 and which was located at 107 W. Main Ave. It was listed in the NRHP in 1992, reference #85000889.
- The Shonessy Building/Don Chun Wo Store which was built in 1913 and which was located at 121 W. Main Ave. It was listed in the NRHP in 1985, reference #85000893.
- The Souva—Cruz House which was located at 310 W. Main St. It was listed in the NRHP in 1985, reference #85003688.

== Endangered properties ==
The Arizona Preservation Foundation is an agency which identifies critically endangered cultural resources of major historical significance to the state. In 2012, the foundation identified the following properties in Casa Grande as endangered:

- The Fisher Memorial Home. (Note: The Fisher Memorial Home located at 300 E. 8th St. was completely destroyed by fire on August 4, 2017.)
- The Meehan/Gaar House.

== Buildings ==
The following is a brief description with the images of the buildings listed.

=== Fieldstone structures ===
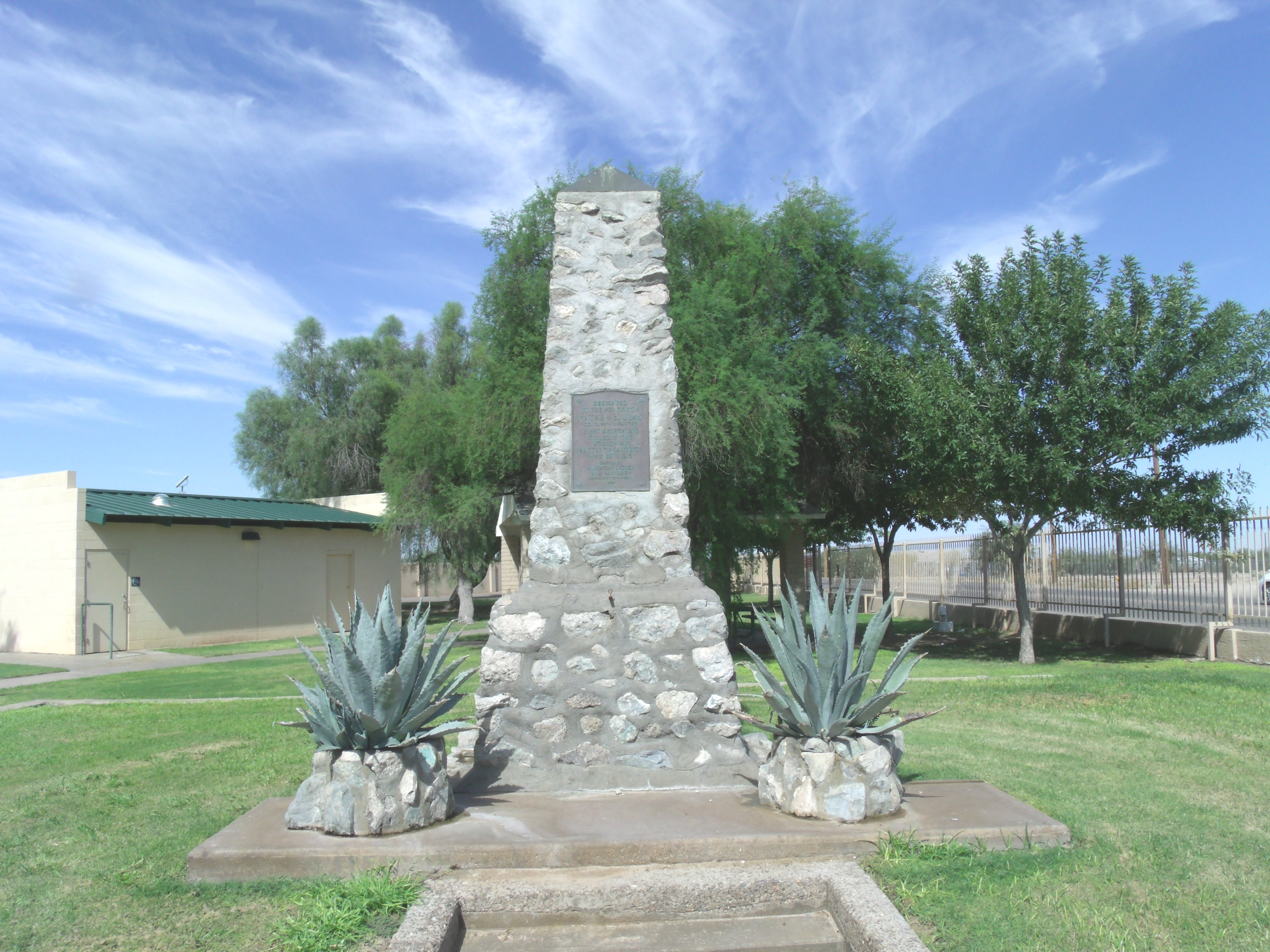
The Pvt. Matthew B. Juan monument in the town of Sacaton, Arizona.

Michael Sullivan was a local stonemason who in the 1920s built various structures of fieldstone in Casa Grande. The stones collected from the surface of fields where it occurs naturally. The stones used as fieldstones are building construction materials which are collected from the surface of fields where they occur naturally. Sullivan's last completed project was the Pvt. Matthew B. Juan monument in the town of Sacaton, Arizona. Sullivan did not see the dedication of this monument as he died on February 25, 1928, of a heart attack while en route to Sacaton for a visit. Among the structures which he built are the following:

- The Emil and Caroline Meyer House, built in 1920 and located at 222 9th St.
- The House at 320 West Eighth Street a.k.a. The Stone Barber Shop , was built in 1920 and is located at 320 W. 8th St.
- The Stone Bungalow was built in 1921 and is located at 515 E. 3rd St.
- The Stone Warehouse was built in 1922 and is located in the rear of the building at 119 Florence St.
- The Casa Grande Woman's Club Building, built in 1924 and located at 407 N. Sacaton St.
- The Casa Grande Stone Church, built in 1927 and located at 110 W. Florence Boulevard.
- The Fisher Memorial Home, built in 1927 and located at 300 E. 8th St. (see "Notes section").
- The Vasquez House, was built in 1927 and located at 114 E. Florence Boulevard.

=== Houses of religious worship ===
The following are the houses of religious worship in Casa Grande listed in the NRHP:

- The Casa Grande Stone Church (Heritage Hall) – was built in 1927 and is located at 110 W. Florence Boulevard. NRHP-listed in 1978.
- Saint Anthony's Church – was built in 1935 and is located at 215 N. Picacho St. NRHP-listed in 1985.
- Saint Anthony's Church Rectory – was built in 1935 and is located at 201 N. Picacho St. NRHP-listed in 1985.
- The First Baptist Church – was built in 1938 and is located at 218 E. 8th St. NRHP-listed in 2002.
- The Church of the Nazarene – was built in 1949 and is located at 305 E. 4th St. NRHP-listed in 2002.
Historic houses of religious worship in Casa Grande
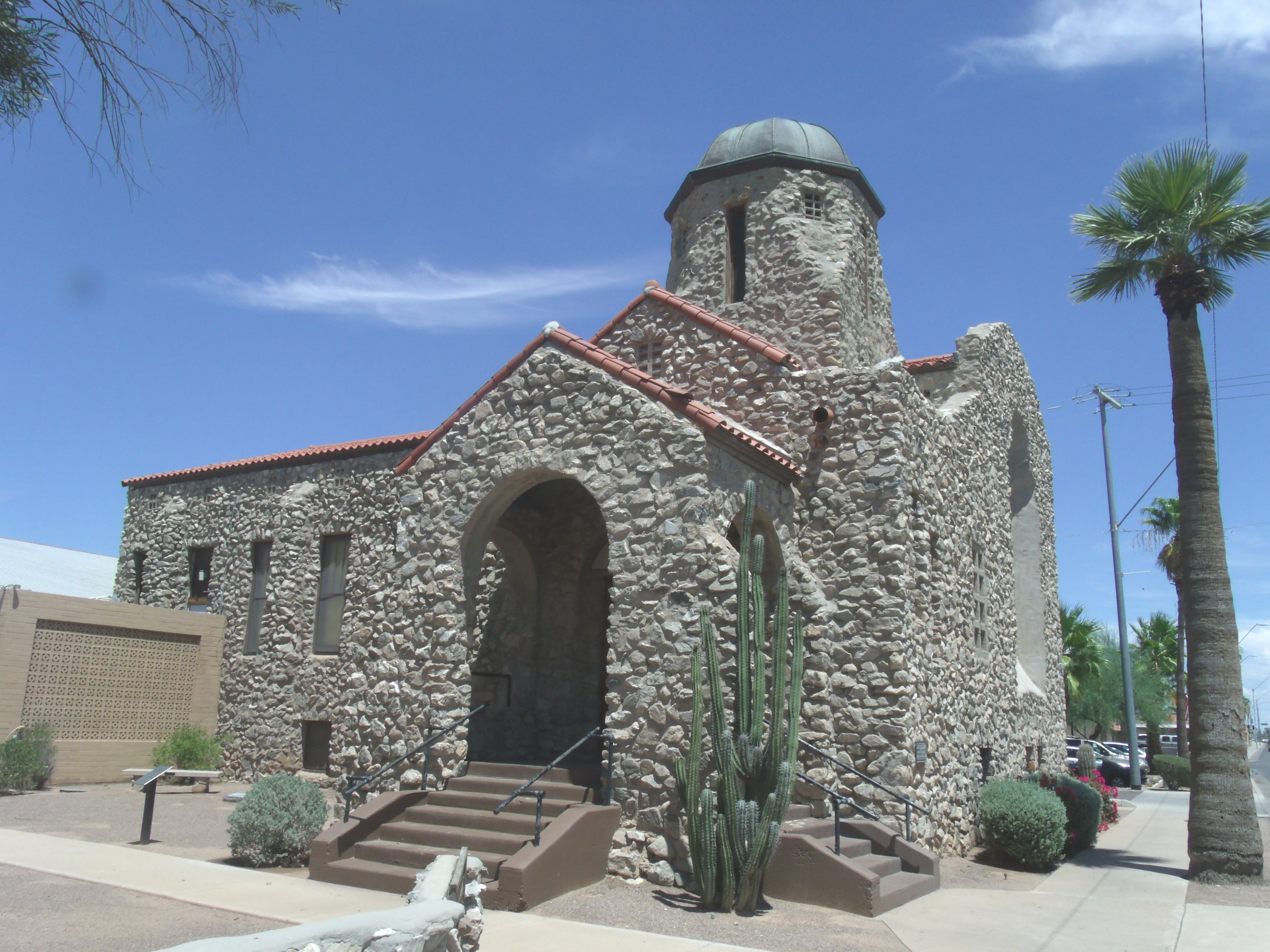
The Casa Grande Stone Church (Heritage Hall).

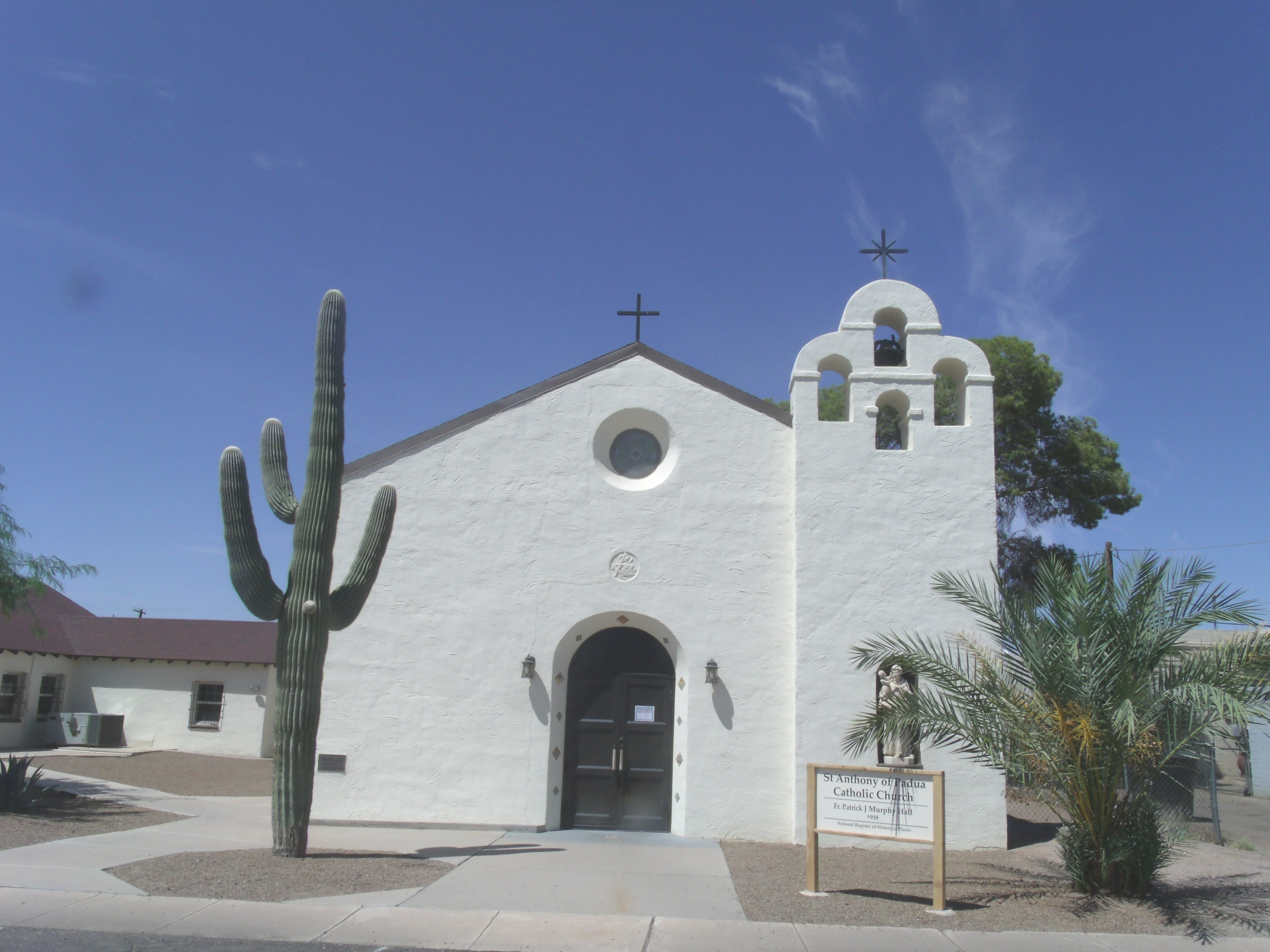
Saint Anthony's Church.

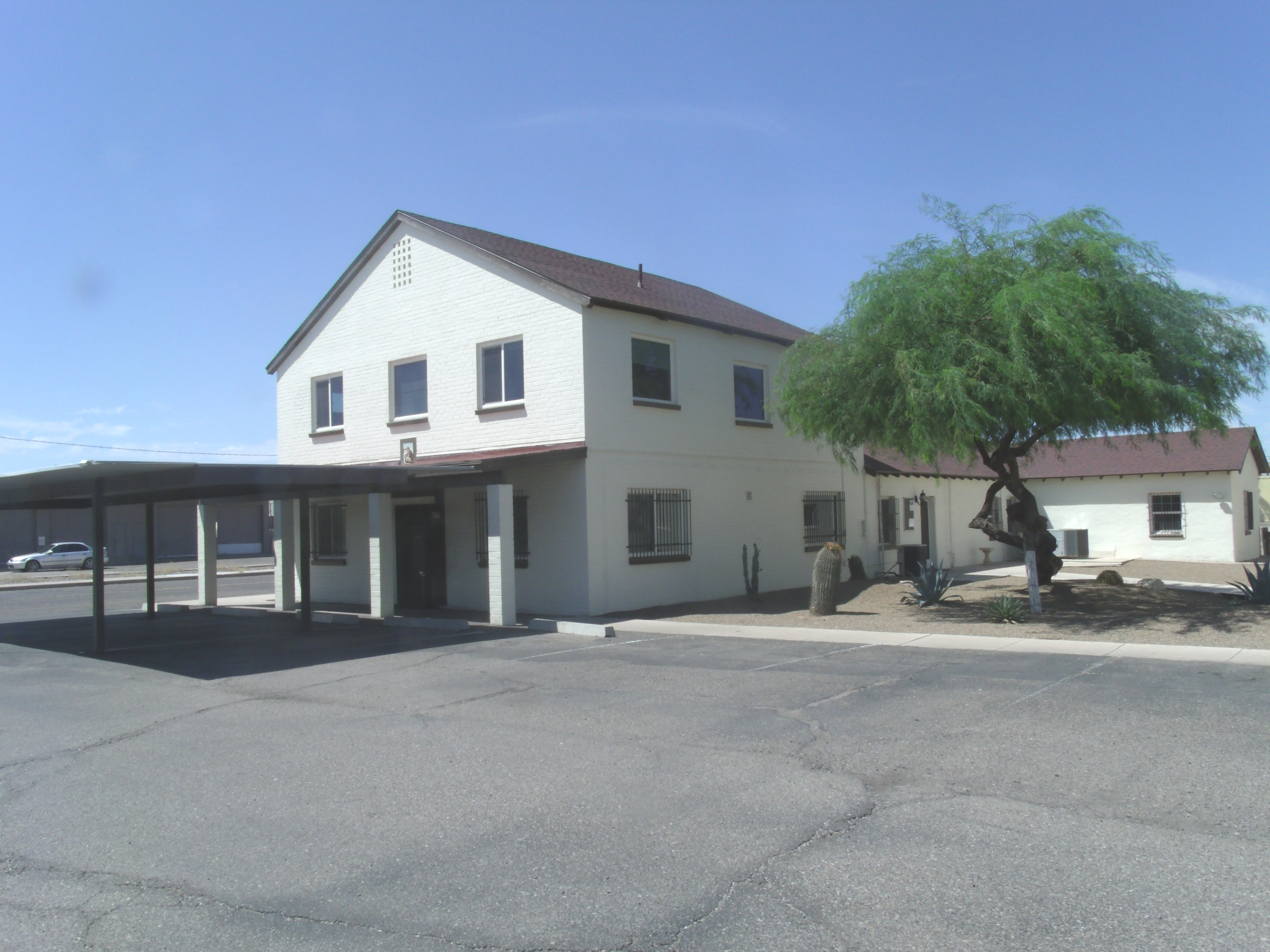
Saint Anthony's Church Rectory.

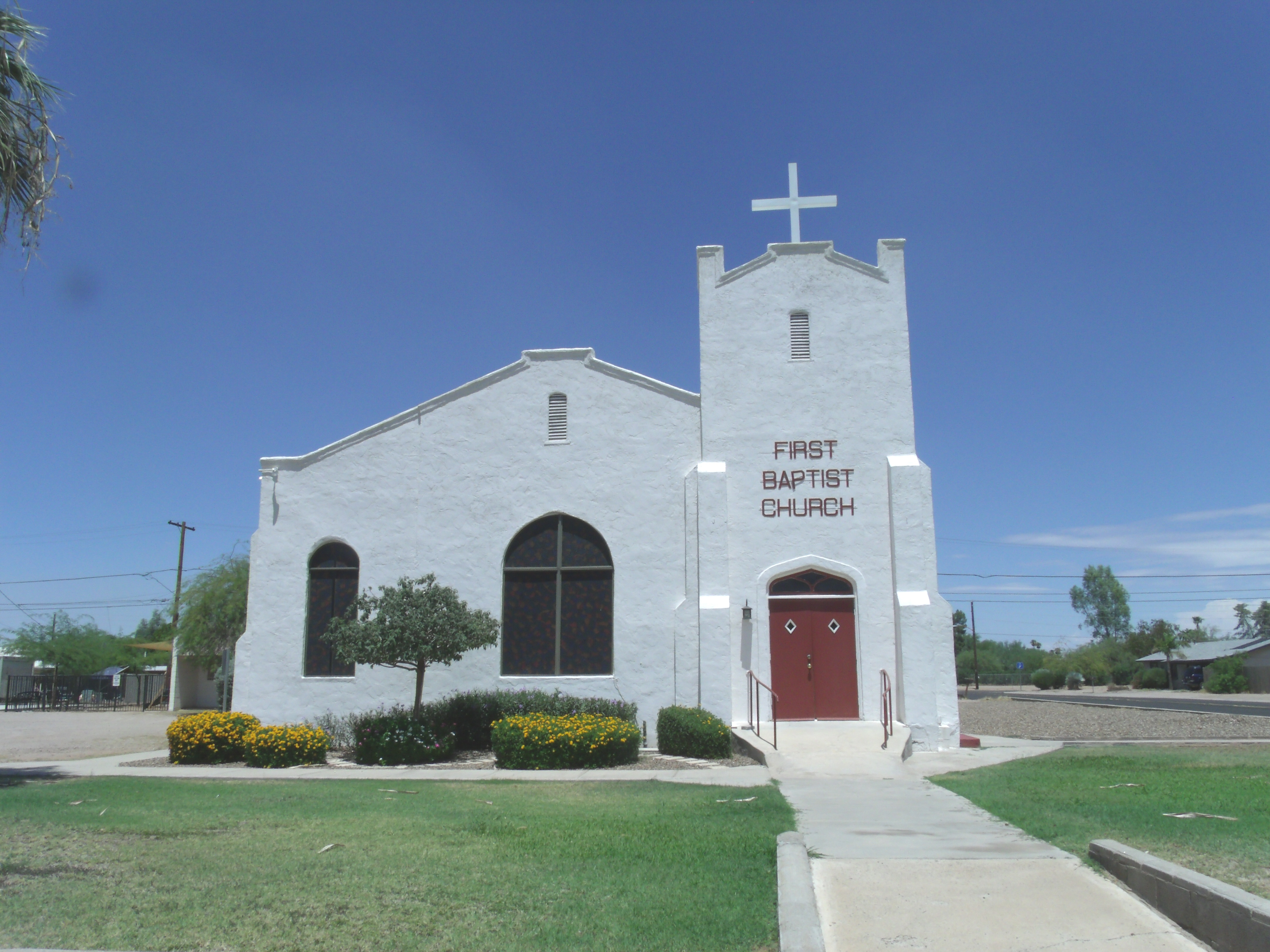
The First Baptist Church.

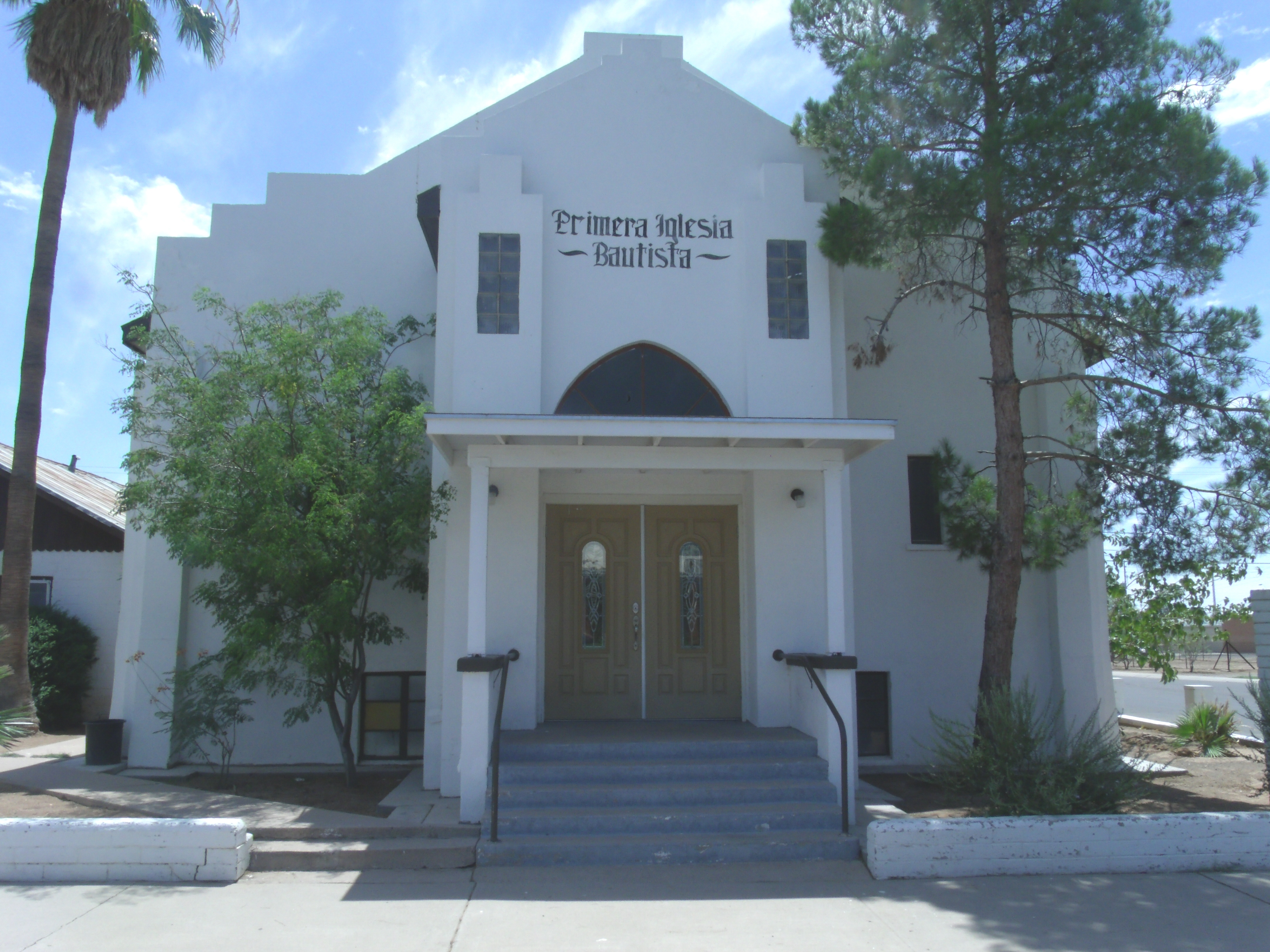
The Church of the Nazarene.

=== Commercial and other historic buildings ===
- The Cruz Trading Post – was built in 1888 and is located at 200 W. Main St. It was listed in the NRHP in 1985, reference #85000883.
- The Casa Grande Hotel – was built in 1898 and is located at 201 W. Main Ave. (behind the Southern Pacific Railroad Depot) It was listed in the NRHP in 1985, reference #85000881.
- Johnston's Grocery Store – was built in 1907 and is located at 301 N. Picacho St. It was listed as "Johnson's Grocery Store" in the NRHP in 1985, reference #85000885.
- Ward's Variety Store – was built in 1914 and is located at 112 N. Sacaton St. It was listed in the NRHP in 1985, reference #85000898.
- The Central Creditors Association Building – was built in 1914 and is located at 118 N. Sacaton St. It was listed in the NRHP in 1985, reference #85000882 .
- The Casa Grande Union High School – was built in 1920 and is located at 510 E. Florence Boulevard. The building now serves as the Casa Grande City Hall. NRHP listed in 1986, reference #86000821.
- The Casa Grande Garage – was built in 1922 and is located at 117 N. Sacaton St. it is listed in the Casa Grande Historic Register.
- The Pioneer Market – was built in 1922 and is located at 119 N. Florence St. It was listed in the NRHP in 1985, reference #85000919.
- The Stone Warehouse – was built in 1922 and is located in the rear of the building at 119 Florence St. It was listed in the NRHP in 1985, reference #85000896.
- The Building at 121 North Florence Street – was built in 1923 and is located at 121 N. Florence St. It was listed in the NRHP in 2002, reference #02000737.
- The Casa Grande Woman's Club Building – was built in 1924 and is located at 407 N. Sacaton St. NRHP listed in 1979, reference #79000425.
- The Southern Pacific Railroad Depot – was built in 1925 and is located at 201 W. Main St. NRHP listed in 2002, reference #02000734.
- The Fisher Memorial Home – a house and funeral home, was built in 1927 and is located at 300 E. 8th St. NRHP listed in 1985, reference #85000884. It was destroyed by a fire in 2017.
- The Casa Grande Hospital – was built in 1928 and is located at 601 N. Cameron Ave. NRHP listed in 2002, reference #02000740.
- The Prettyman's Meat Market and Grocery/Brigg's Jeweler – was built in 1929 and is located at 110 W. Main Ave. NRHP listed in 1985, reference #85000891.
- The Paramount Theatre – was built in 1929 and is located at 420 N. Florence St. NRHP listed in 1999, reference #990001067.
- The Casa Grande Dispatch Building – was built in 1929 and is located at 109 E. 2nd St. NRHP listed in 2002, reference #02000747.
- The Southside Elementary School – was built in 1930 and is located at 501 S. Florence St. It is listed in the Casa Grande Historic Register.
- The Rebecca Dalis School House – was built in 1934 and is located at 110 W. Florence Blvd. It is listed in the Casa Grande Historic Register.
- The Mandell and Meyer Building – was built in 1937 and is located at 211 N. Florence St. It was listed in the NRHP in 2002, reference #02000736.
- The Lincoln Hospital – was built in 1940 and is located at 112 N. Brown Ave. It was listed in the NRHP in 2002, reference #02000741.
- The S.S. Blinky Jr. Building – was built in 1946 and is located at 465 W. Gila Bend Highway. It was listed in the NRHP in 2002, reference #02000748.
- The V.W. Kilcrease Building – was built in 1948 and is located at 139 W. 1st St. It was listed in the NRHP on November 20, 2002, reference #02000754.
- The William Cox Building – was built in 1948 and is located at 501 N. Marshall St. It was listed in the NRHP in 1999, reference #99001068.
- The Valley National Bank building – was built in 1950 and is located at 221 N. Florence St. It was listed in the NRHP in 2002, reference #02000733.
- The Building at 400 East Third Street (once the Church of Christ) – was built in 1950 and is located at 400 E. 3rd St. It was listed in the NRHP in 2002, reference #02000749.
Historic buildings
NRHP
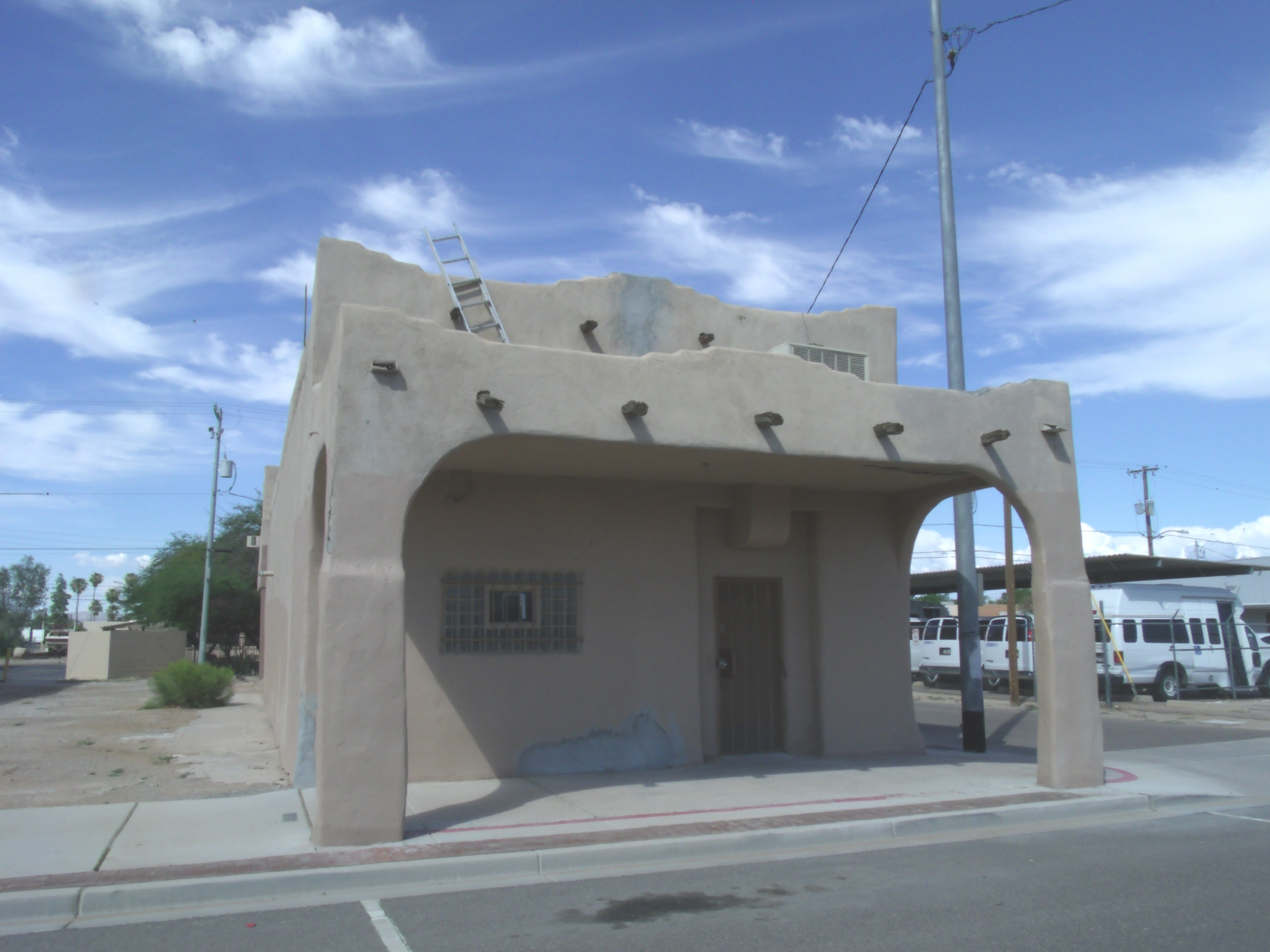
The Cruz Trading Post.

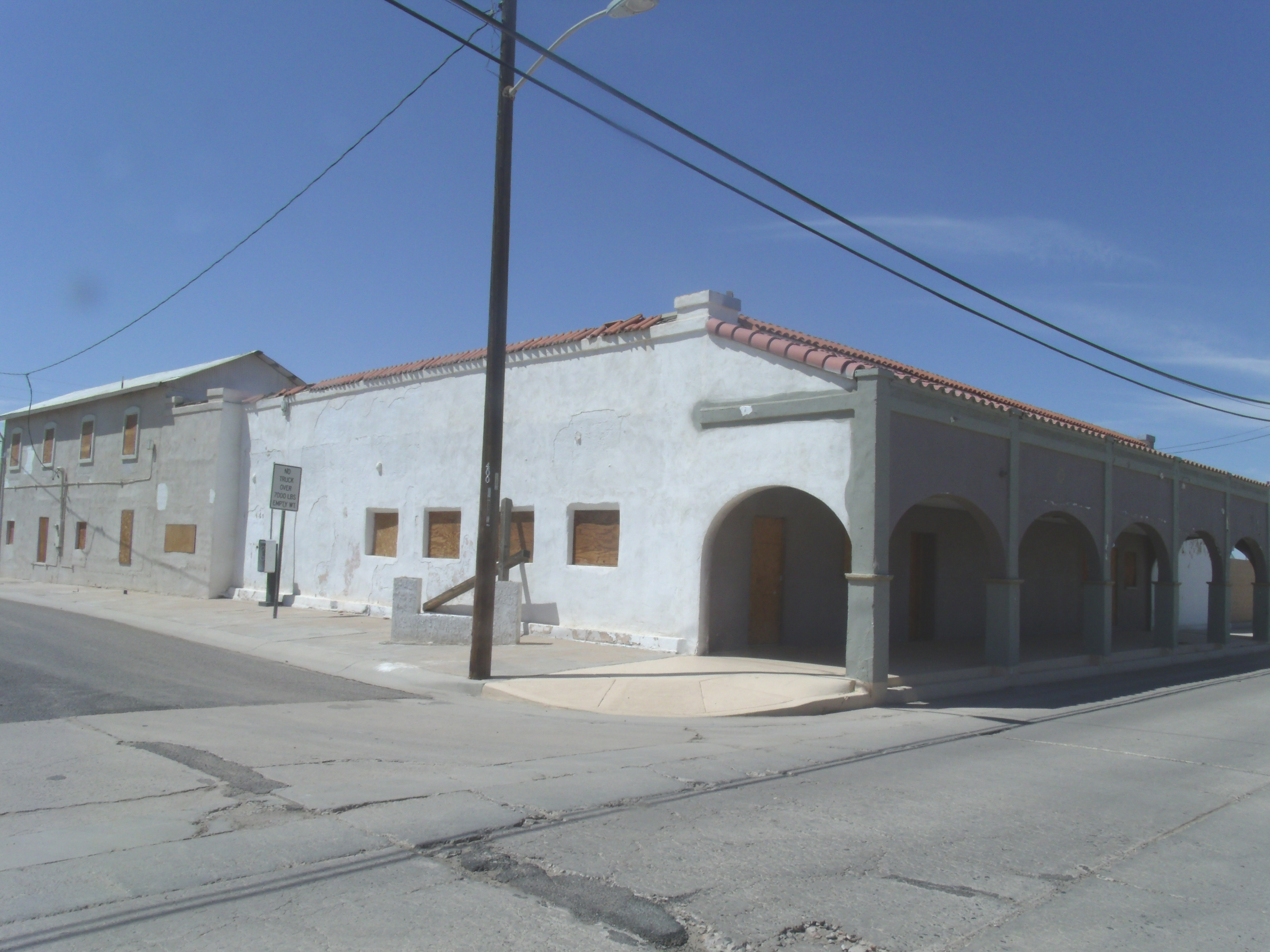
The Casa Grande Hotel.

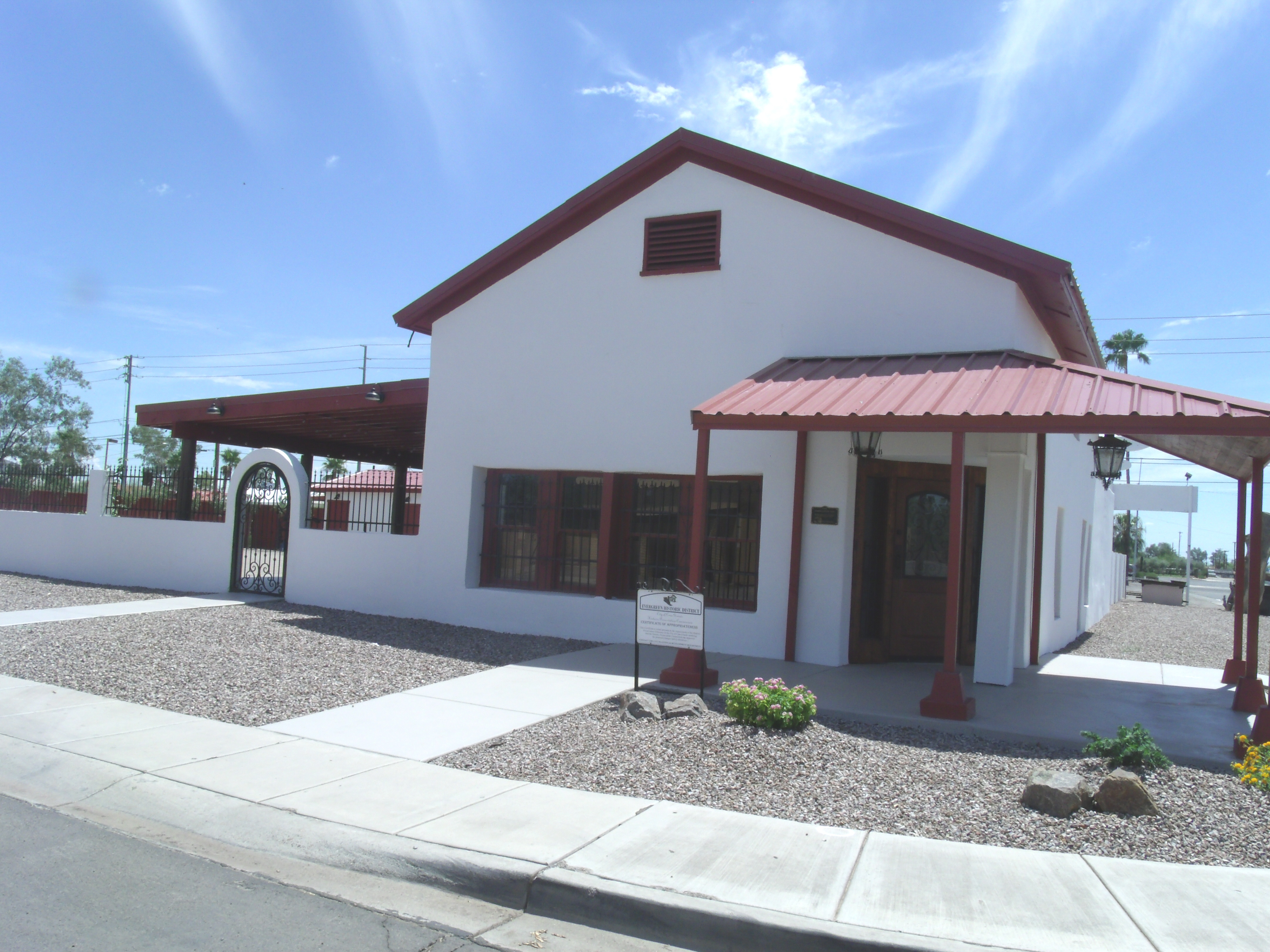
Johnston's Grocery Store.

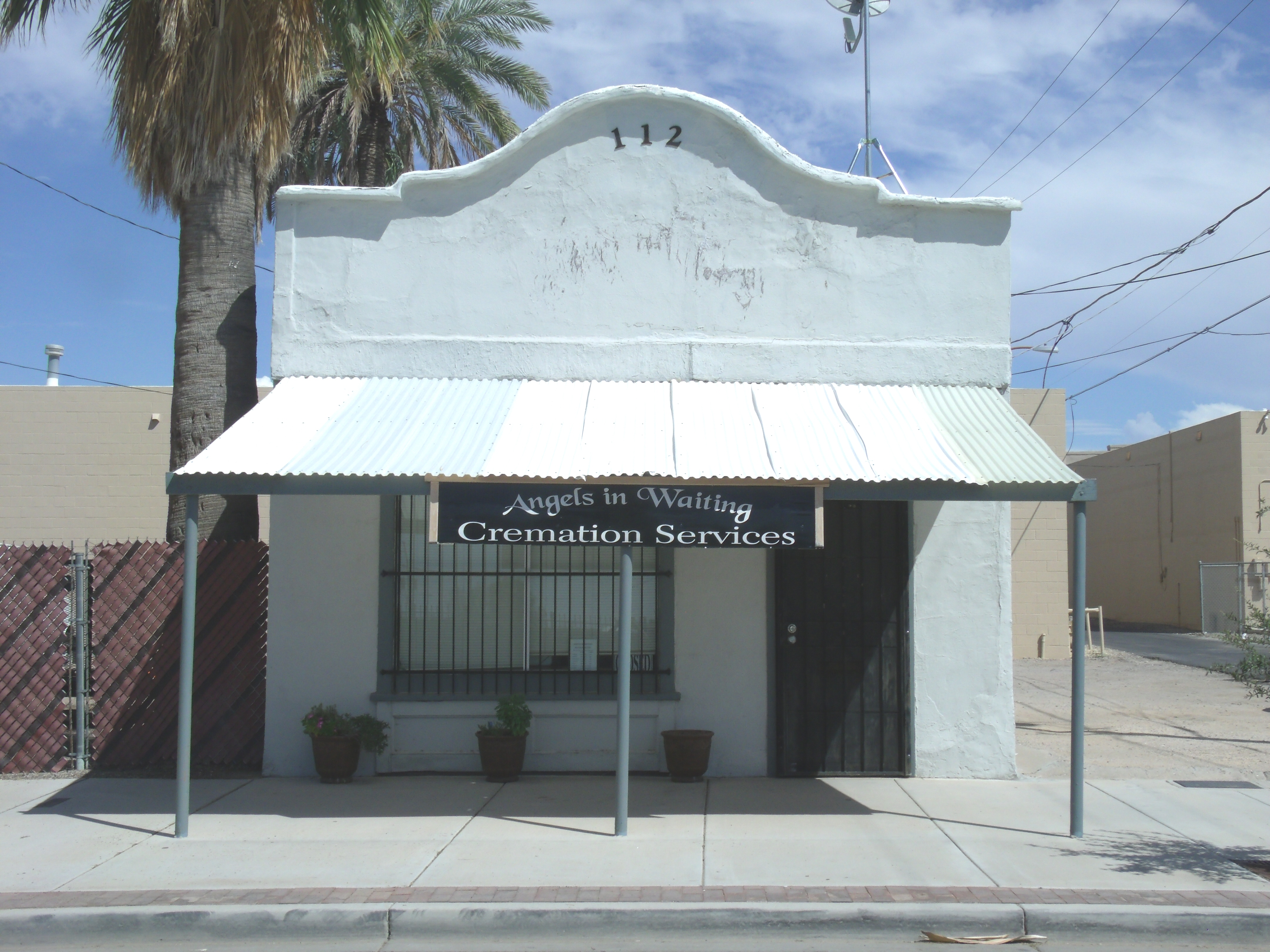
Ward's Variety Store.

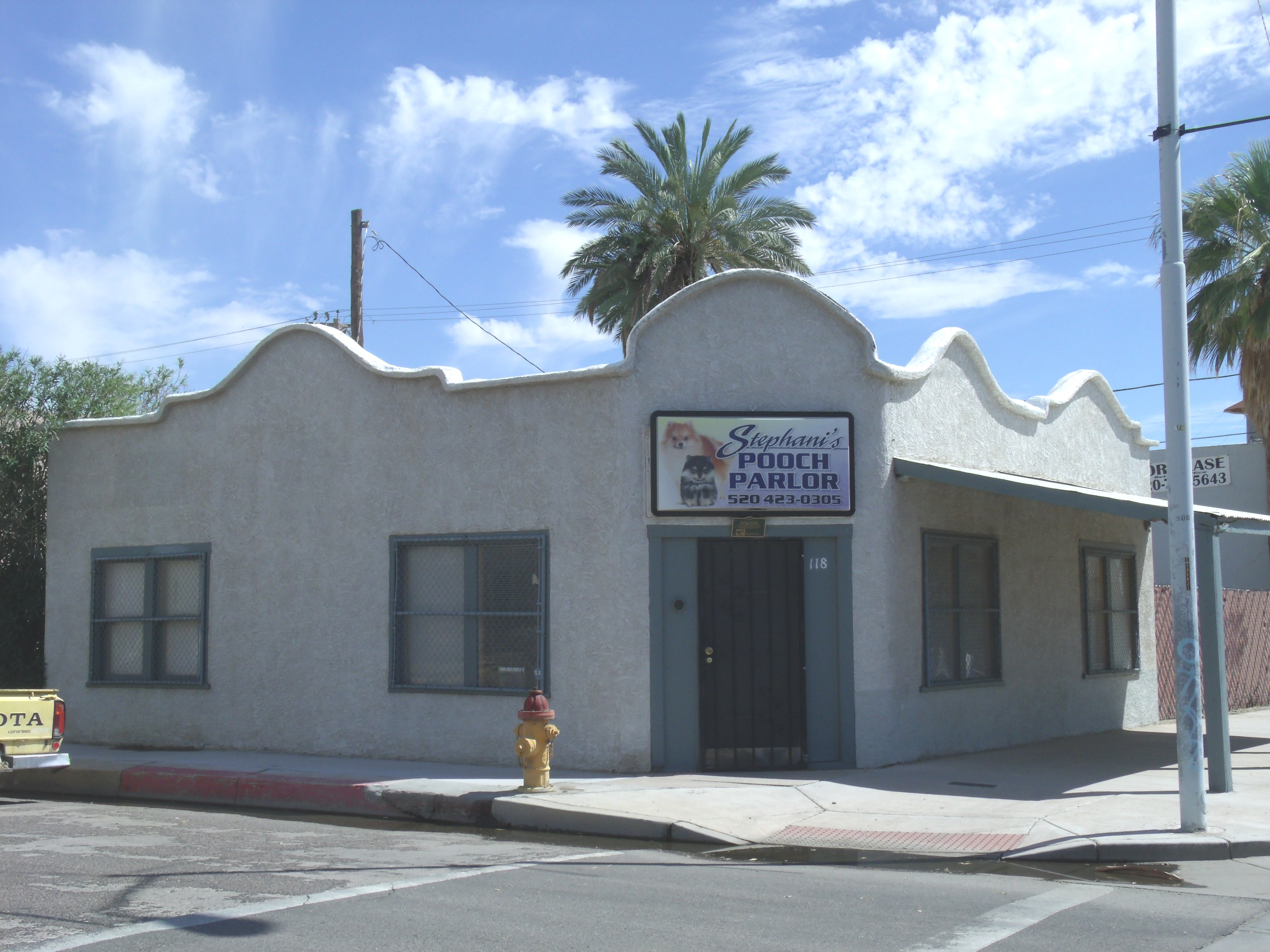
The Central Creditors Association Building.

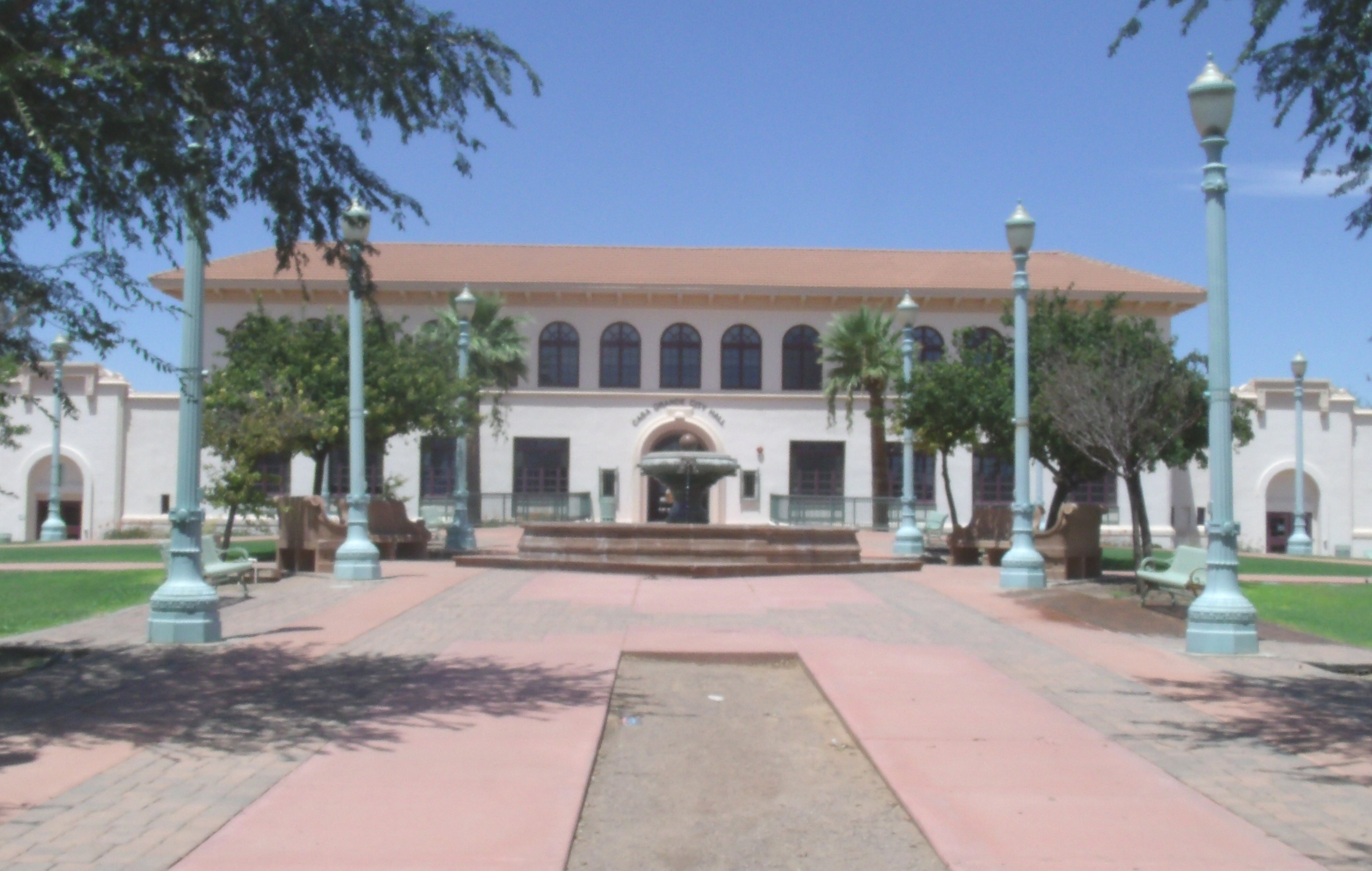
The Casa Grande Union High School.

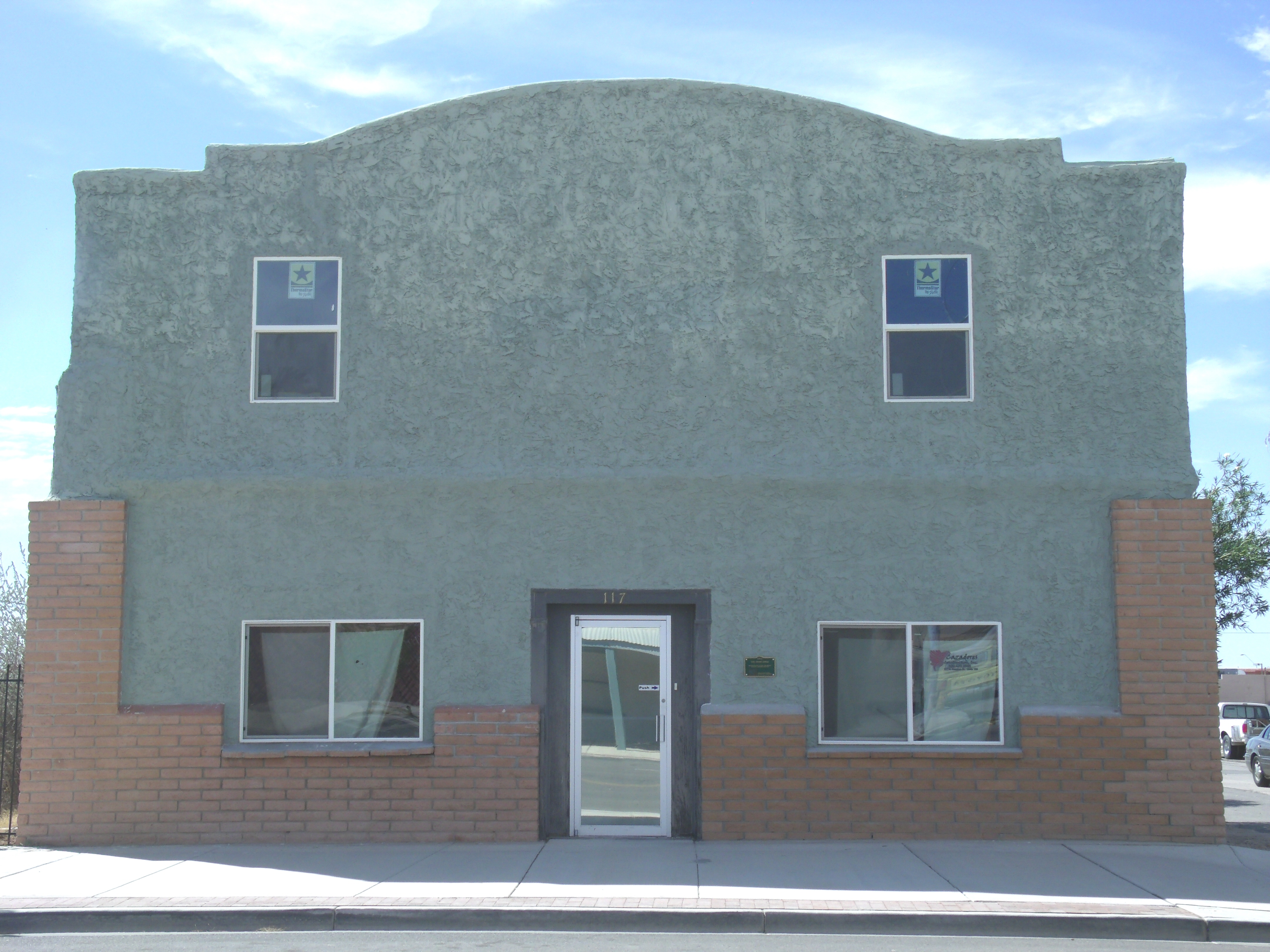
The Casa Grande Garage.

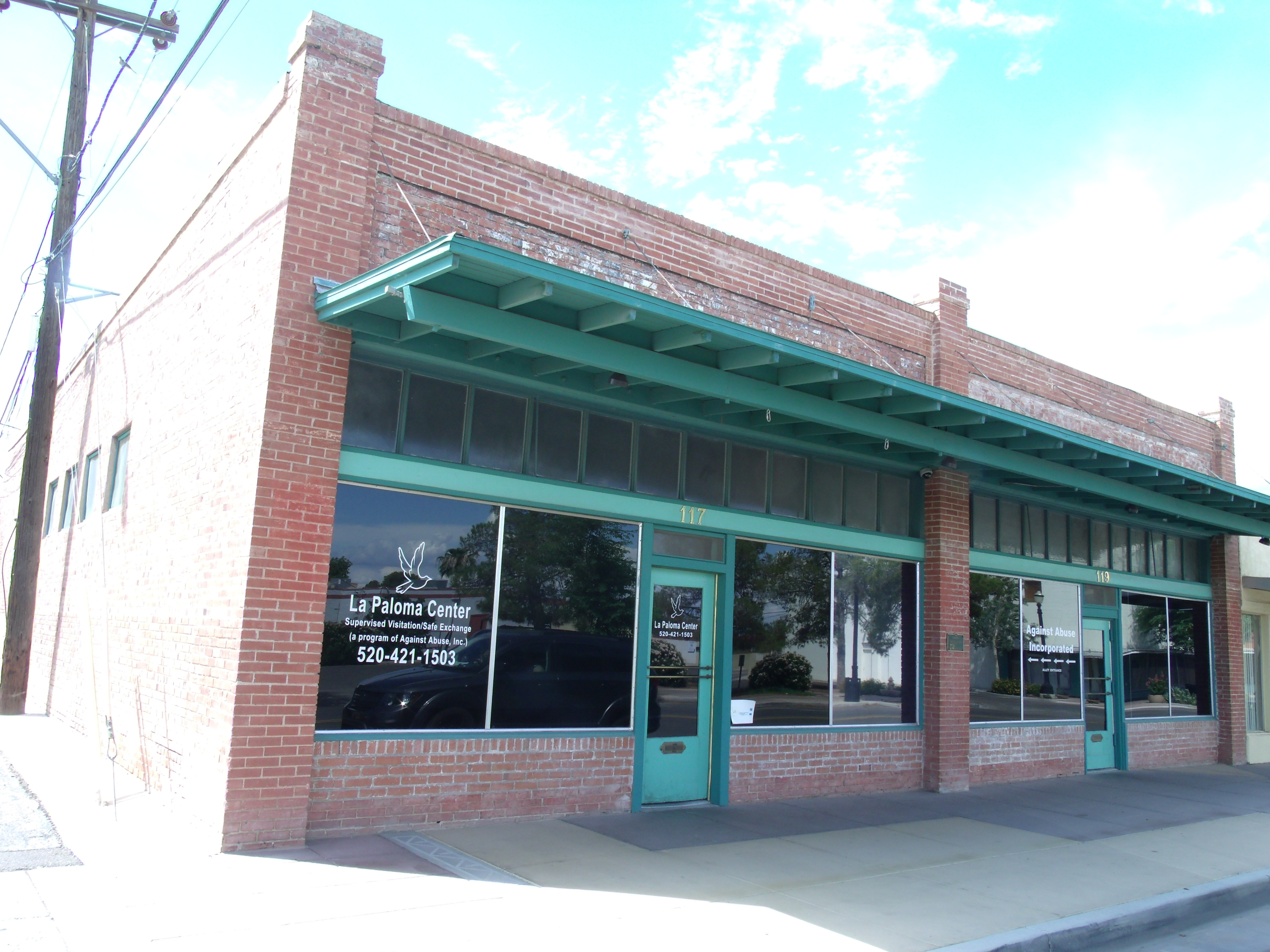
The Pioneer Market.

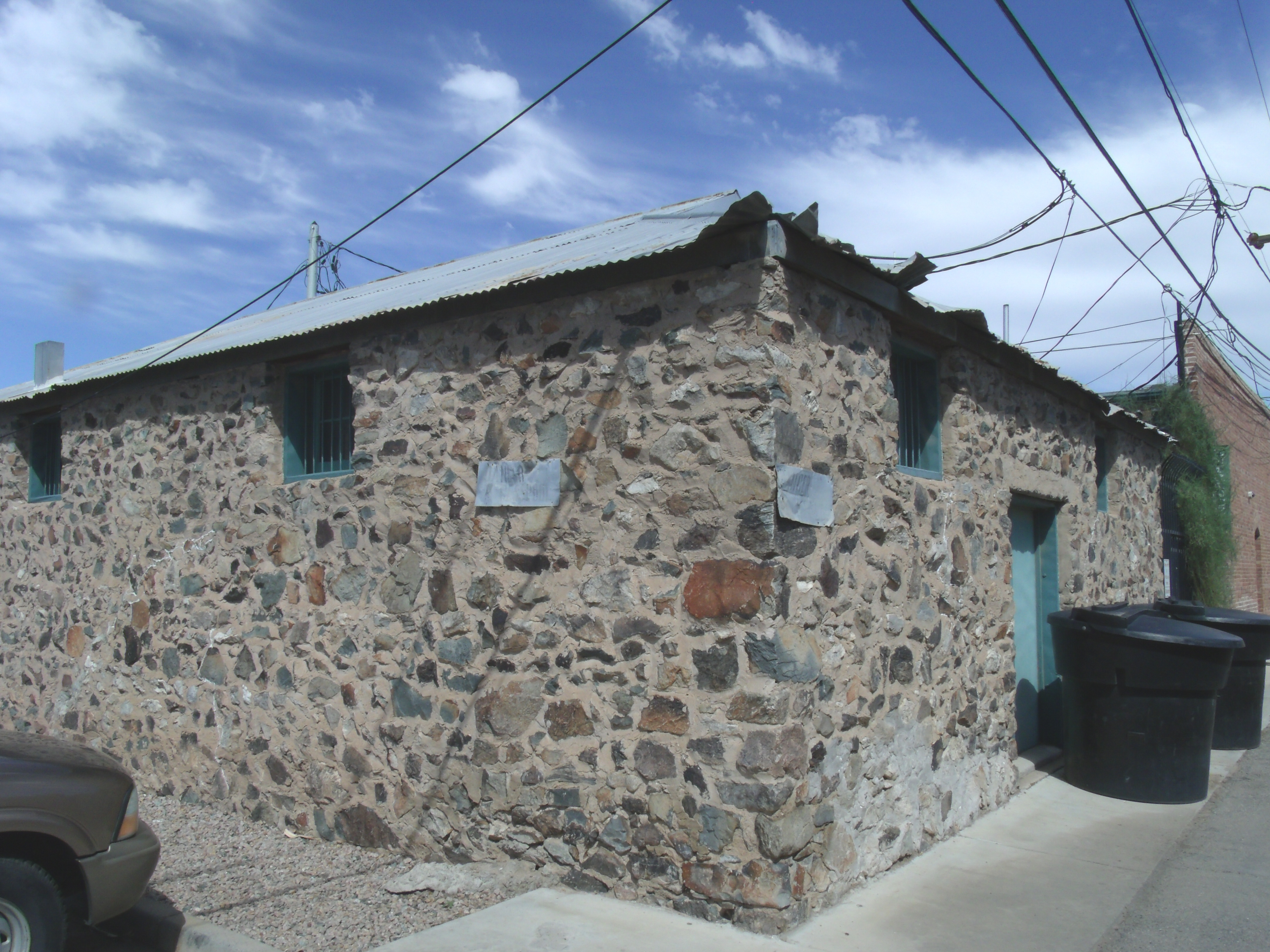
The Stone Warehouse.

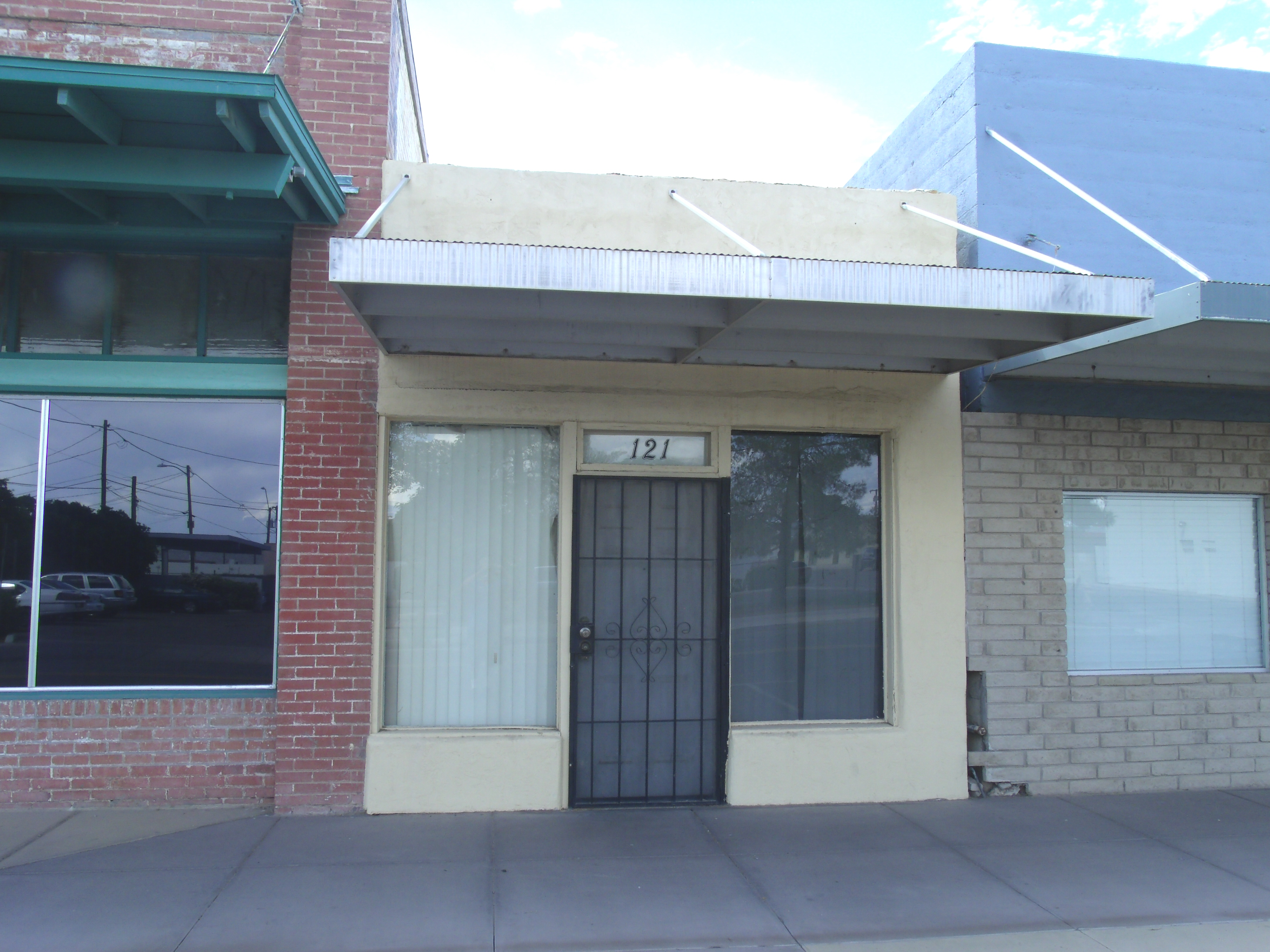
The Building at 121 North Florence Street.

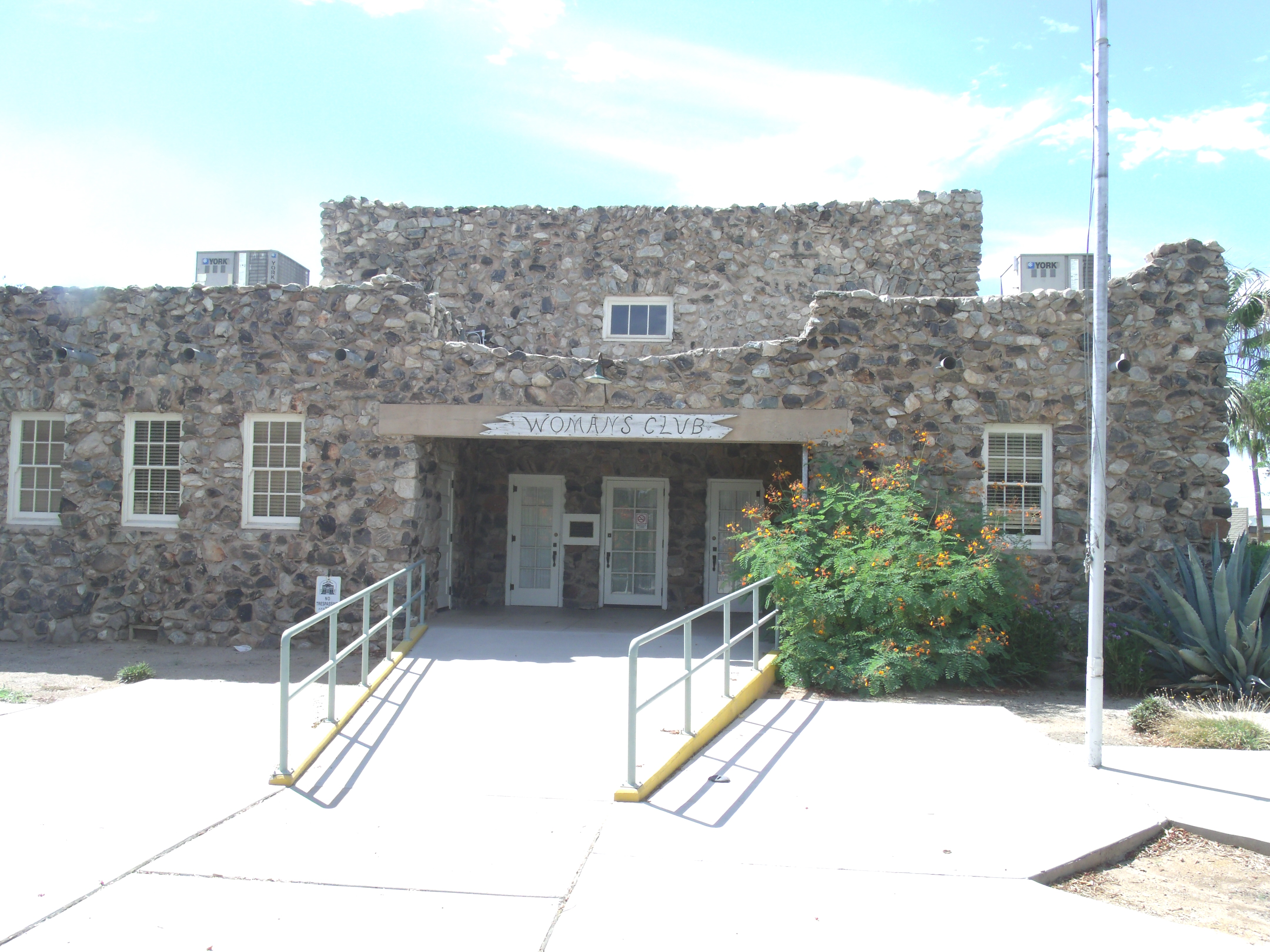
The Casa Grande Woman's Club Building.

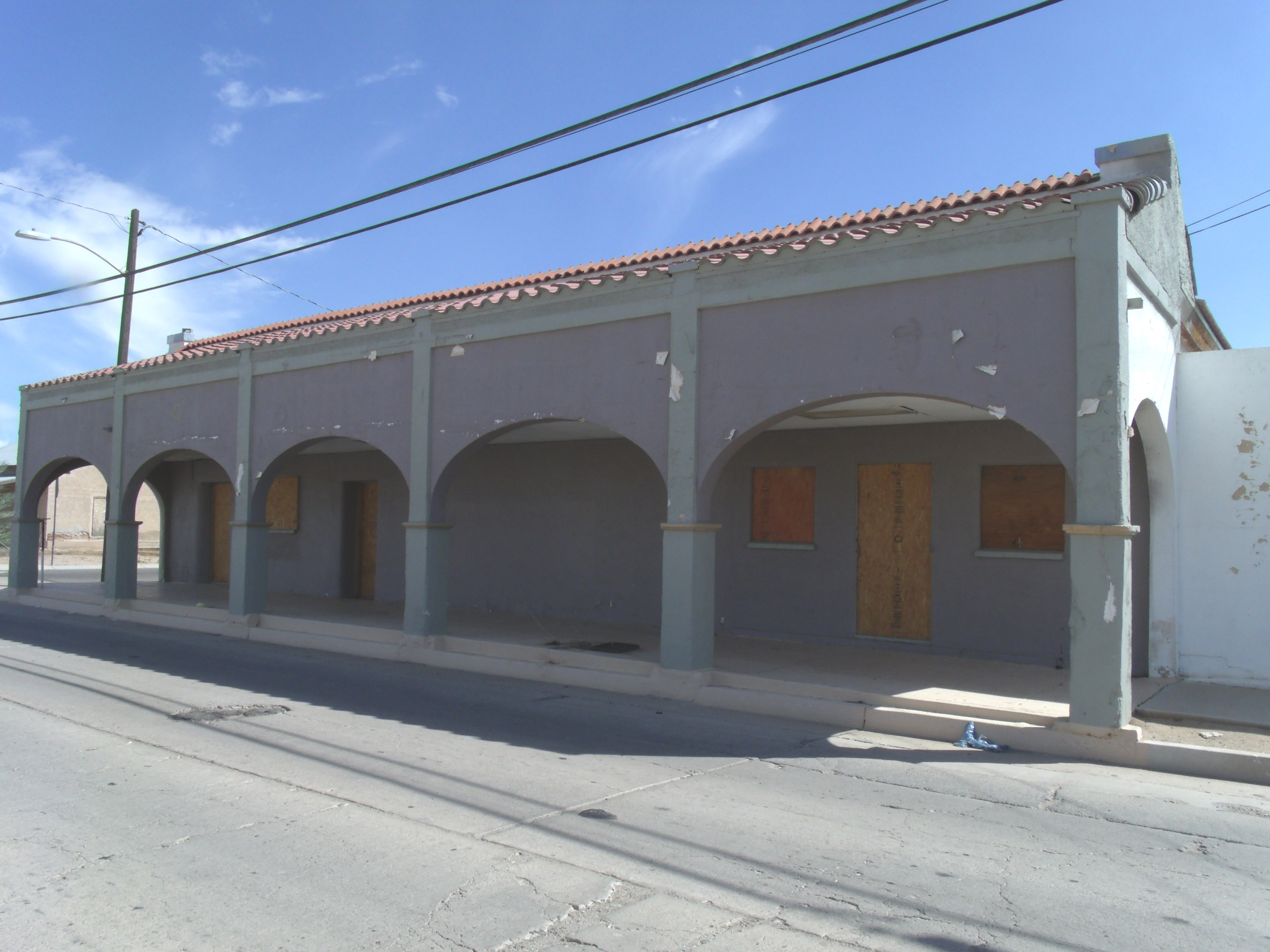
The Southern Pacific Railroad Depot.

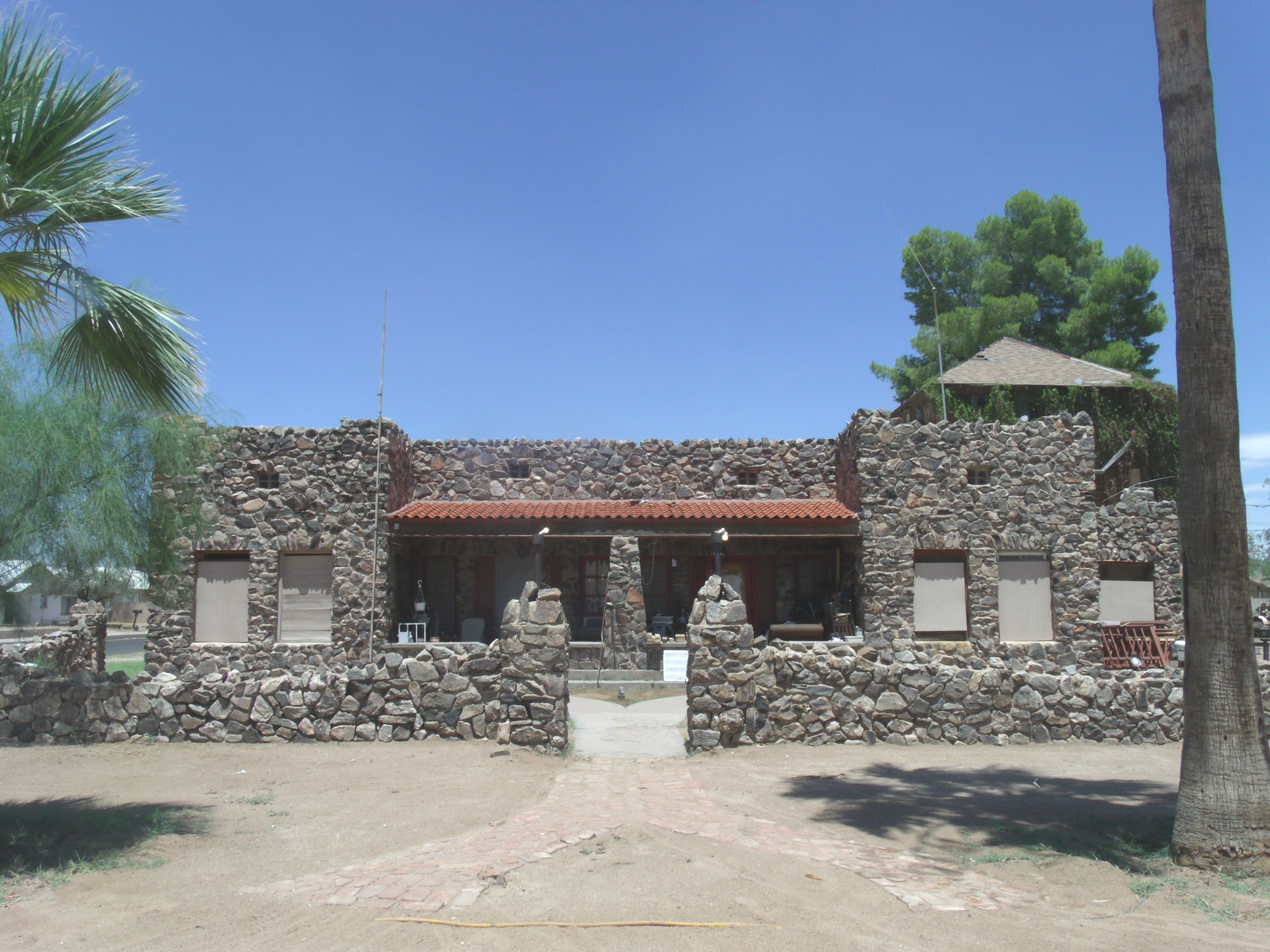
The Fisher Memorial Home.

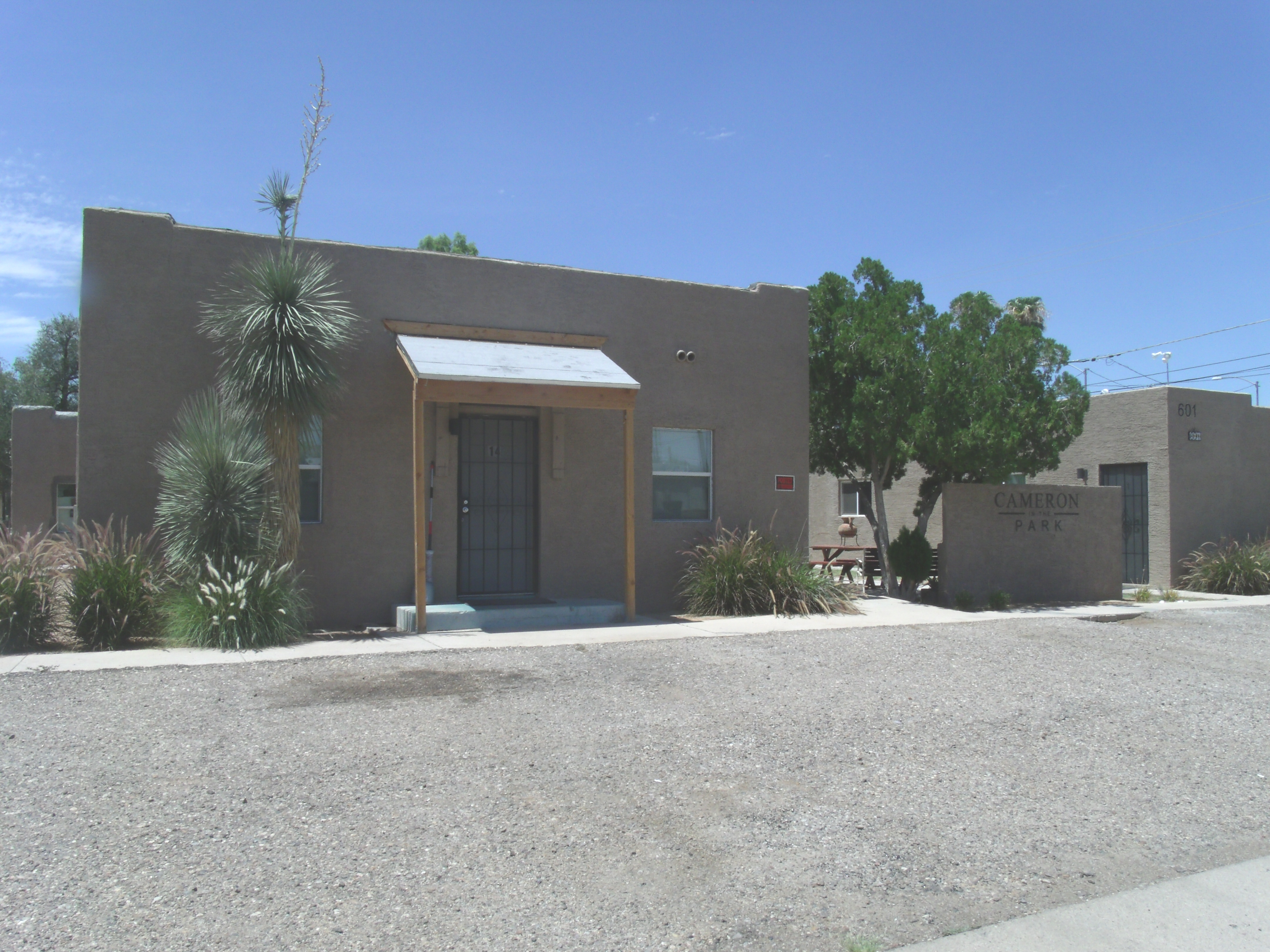
The Casa Grande Hospital.

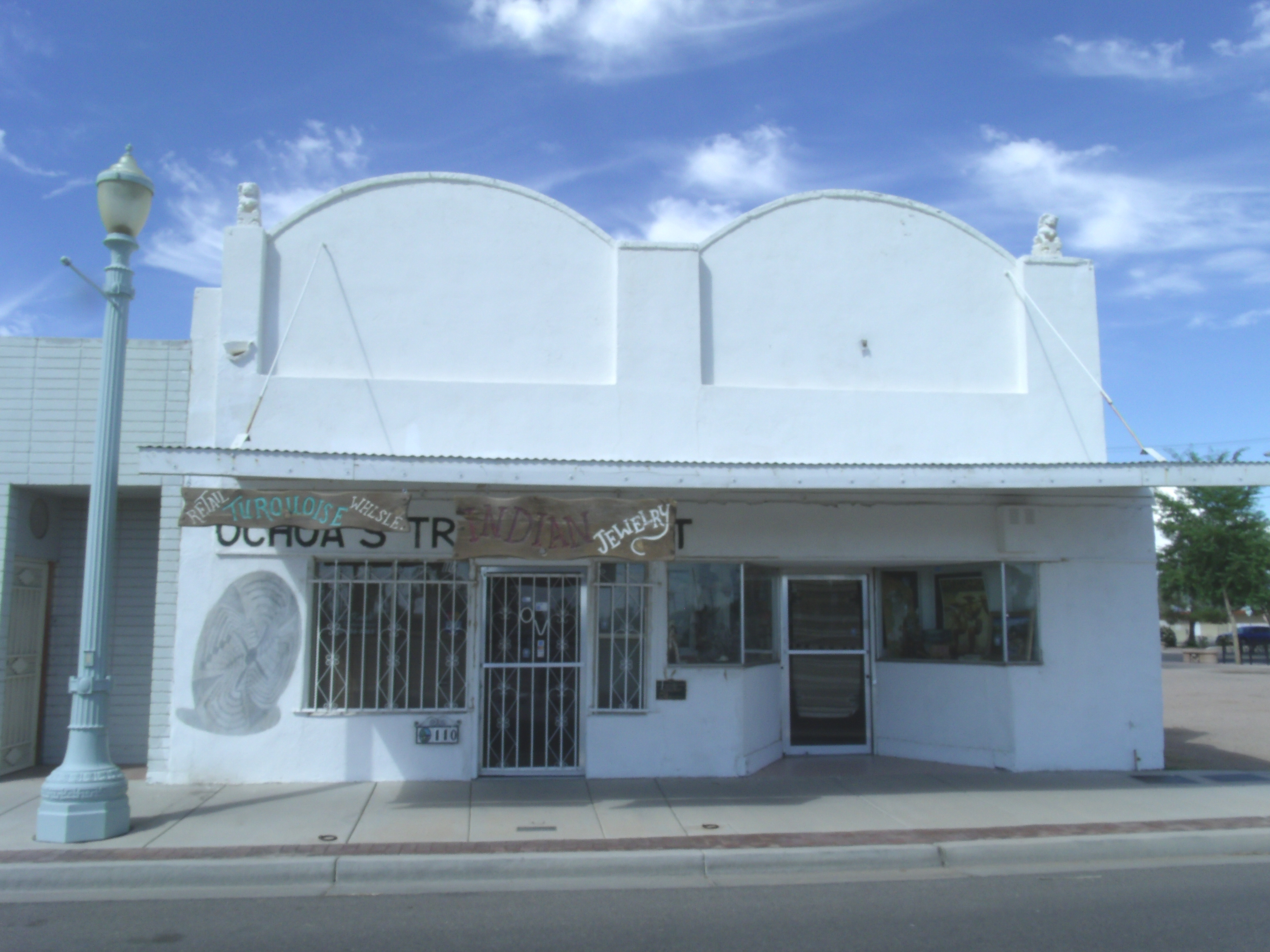
The Prettyman's Meat Market and Grocery/Brigg's Jeweler.

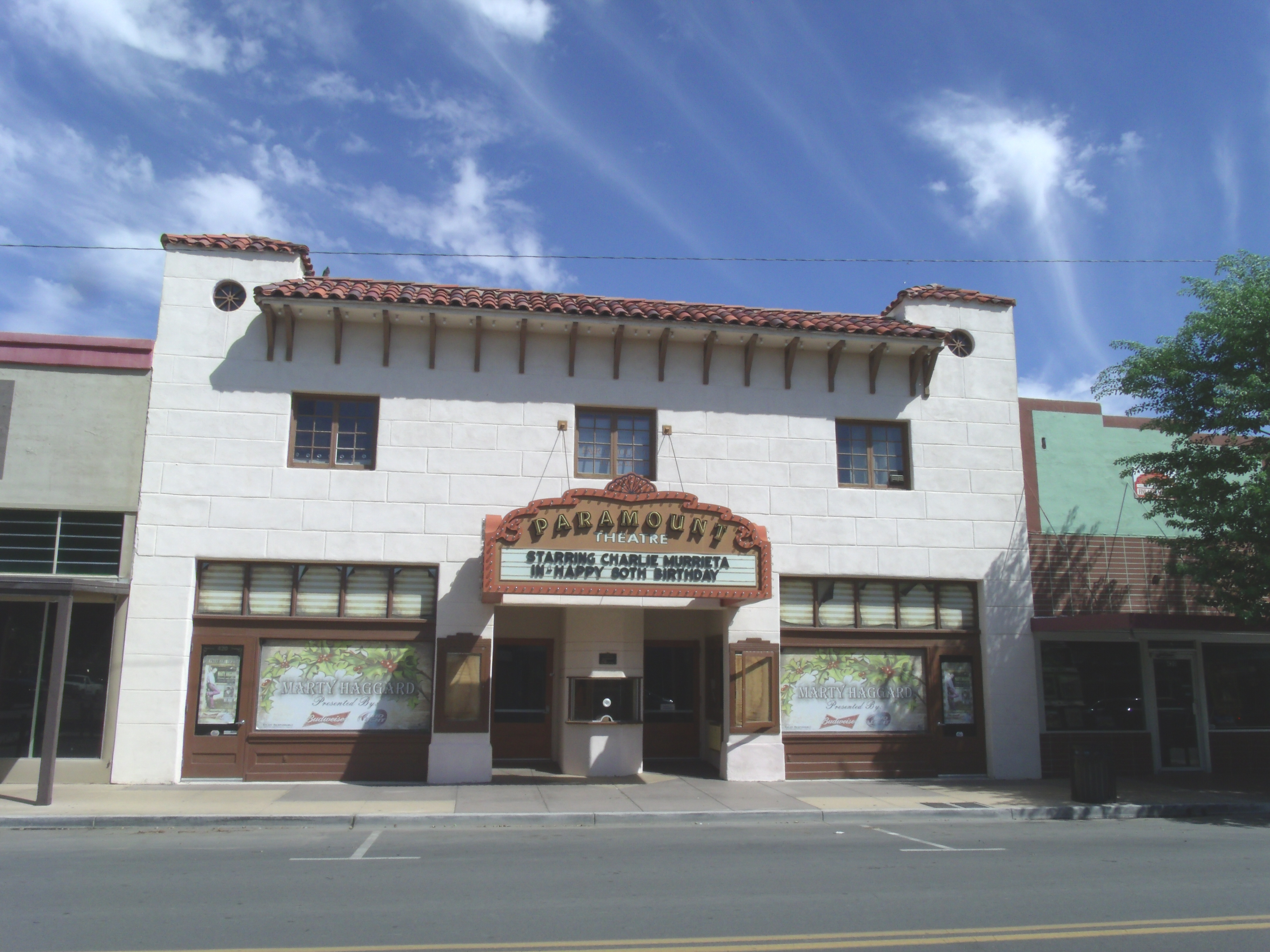
The Paramount Theatre.

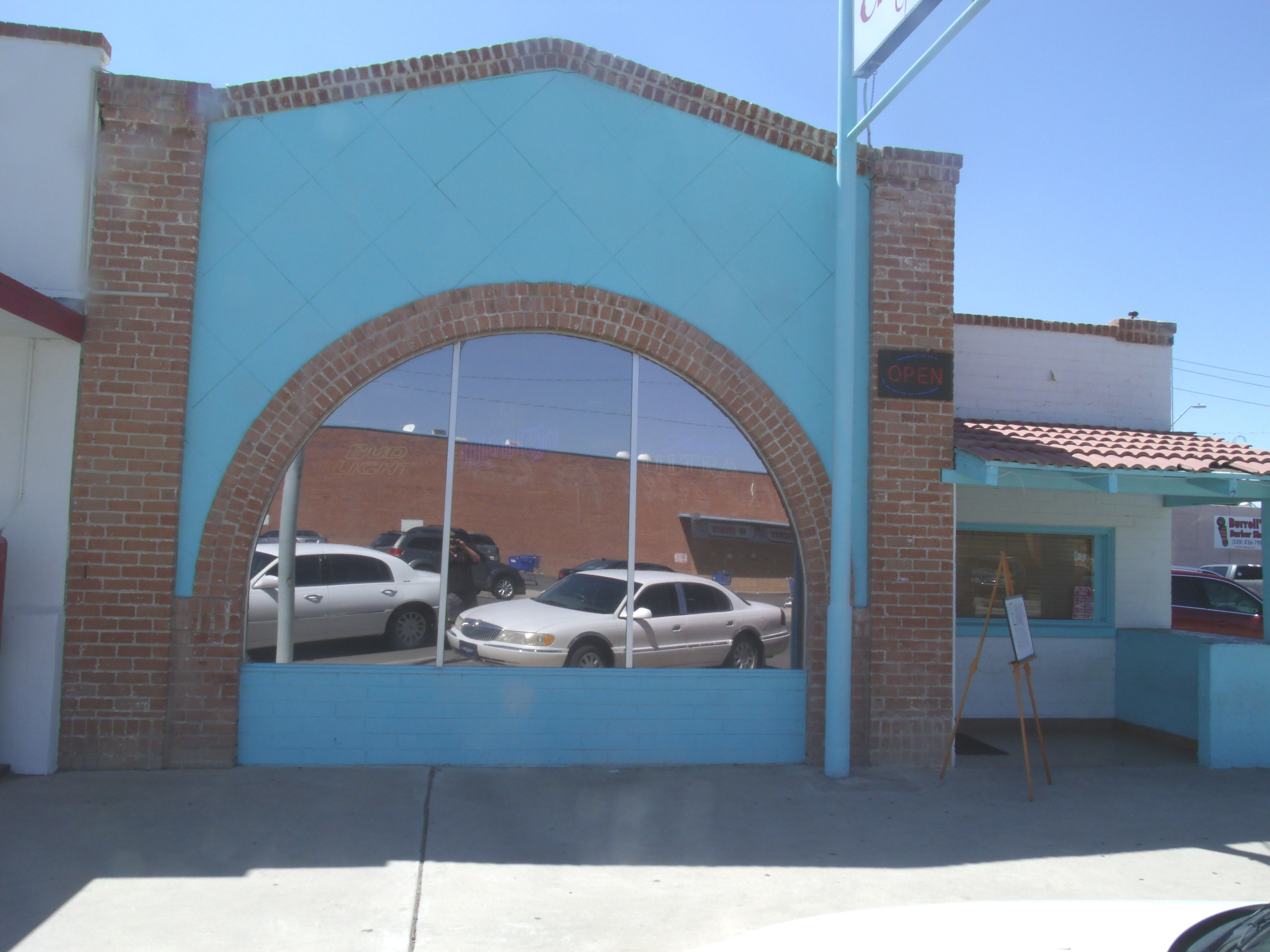
The Casa Grande Dispatch Building.

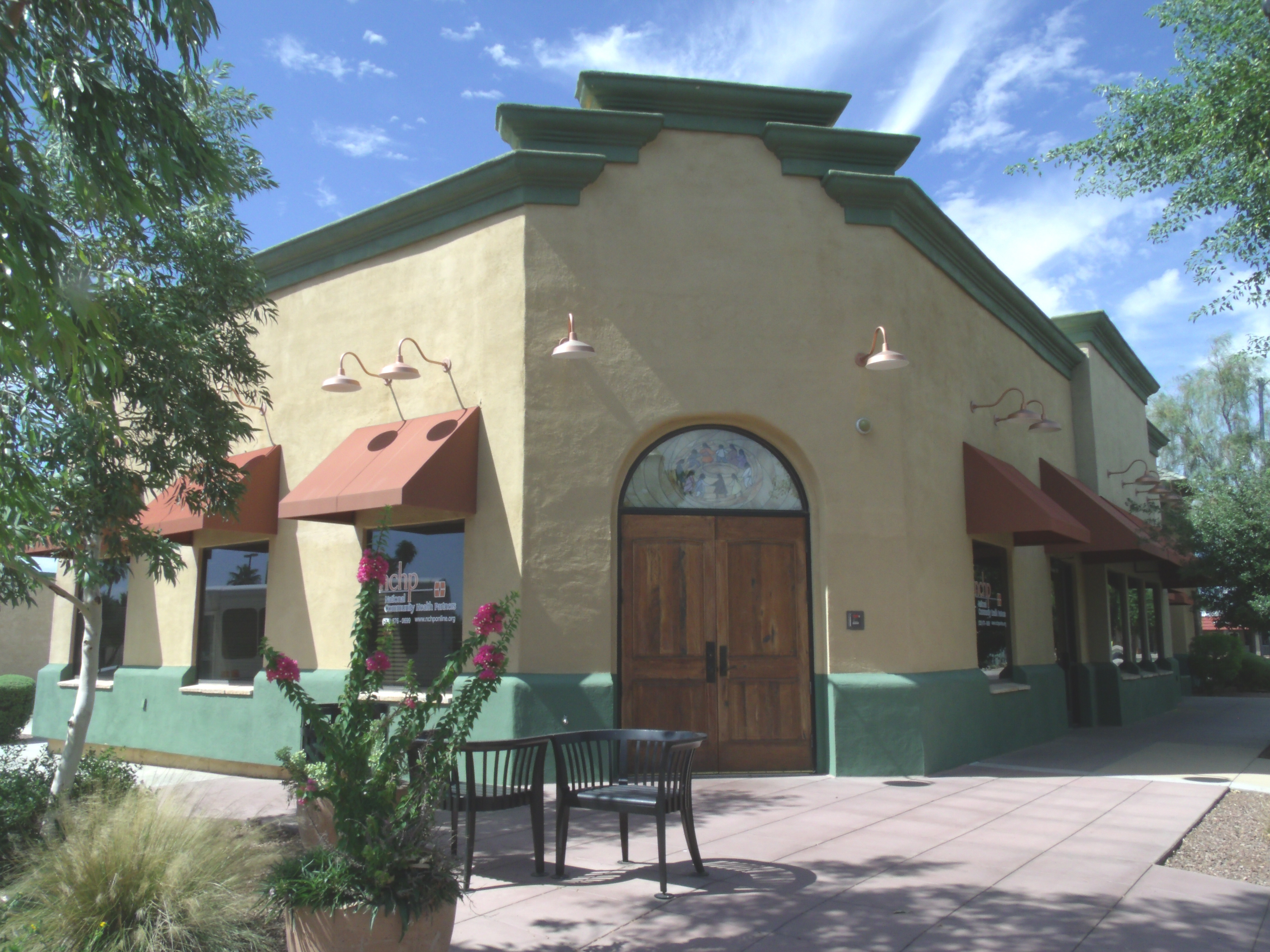
The Southside Elementary School.

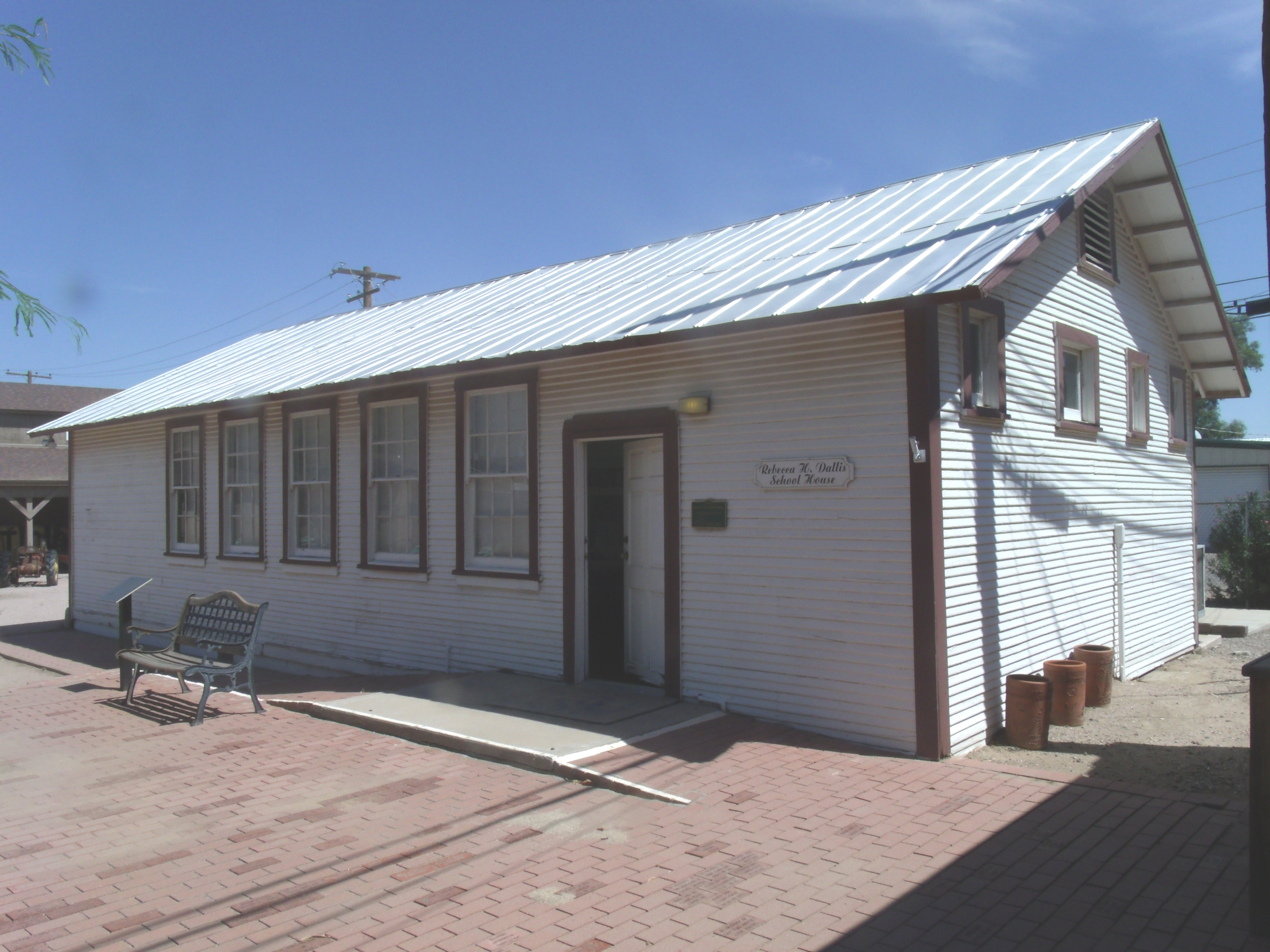
The Rebecca Dalis School House.

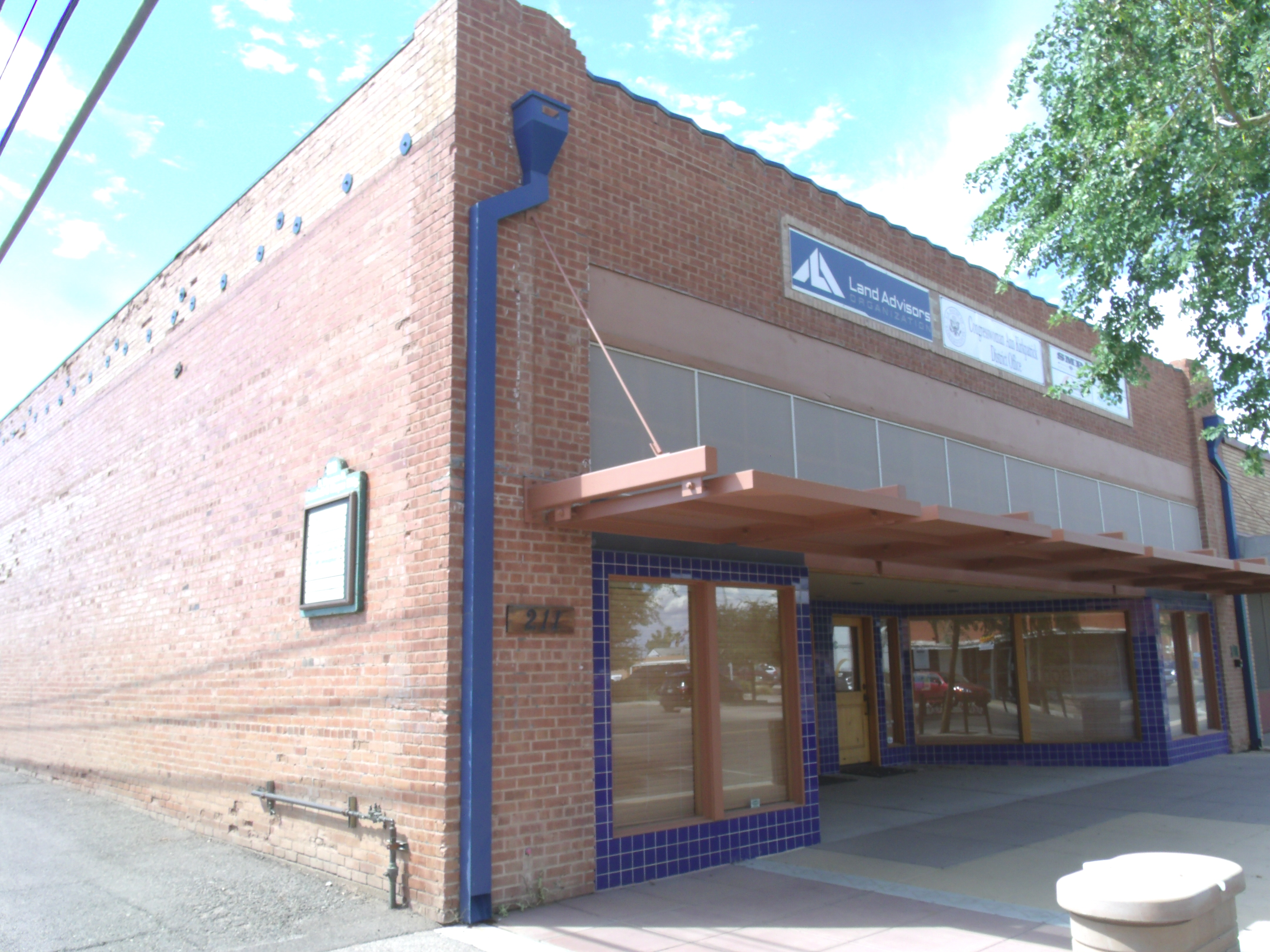
The Mandell and Meyer Building.

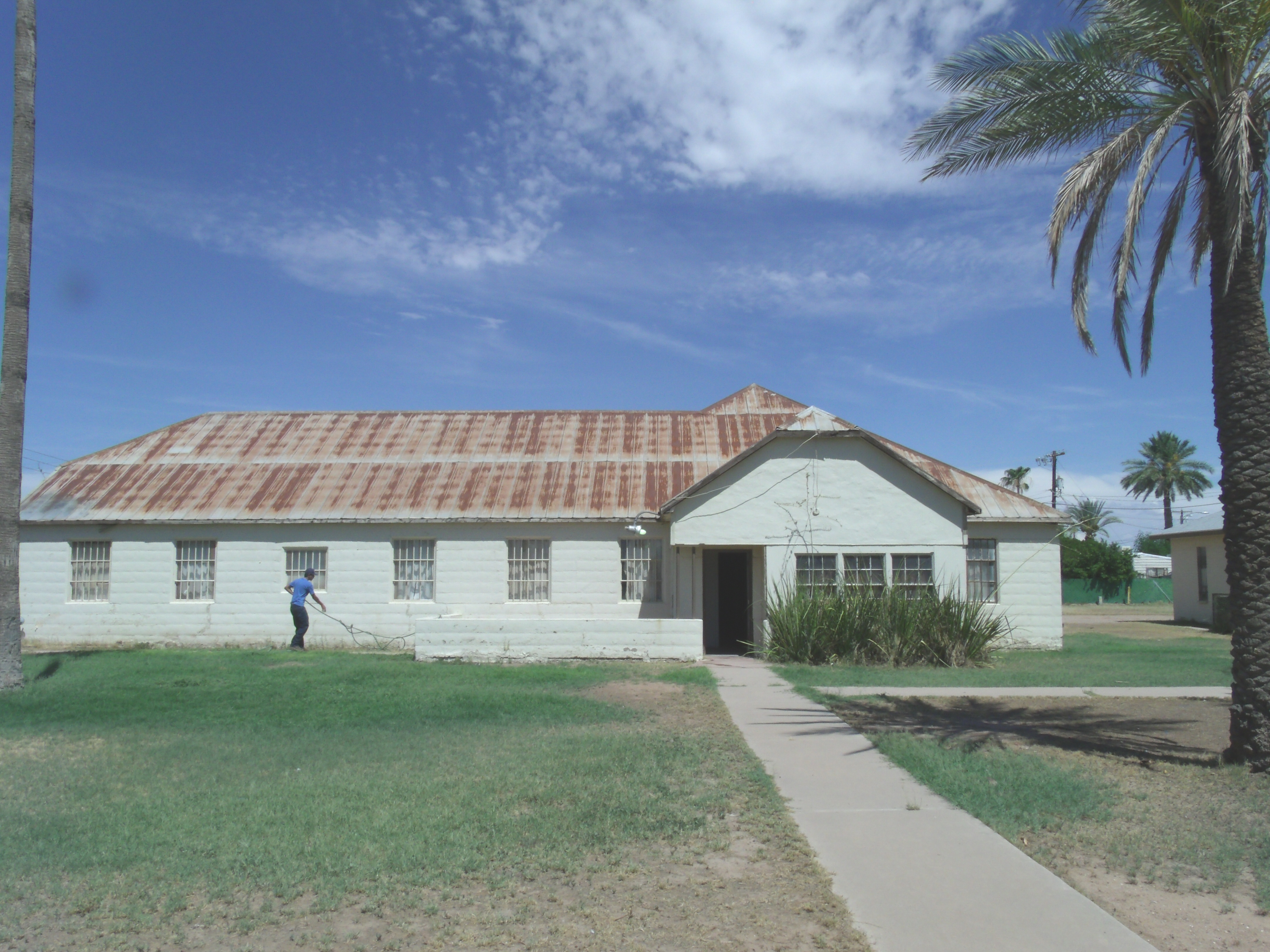
Lincoln Hospital.

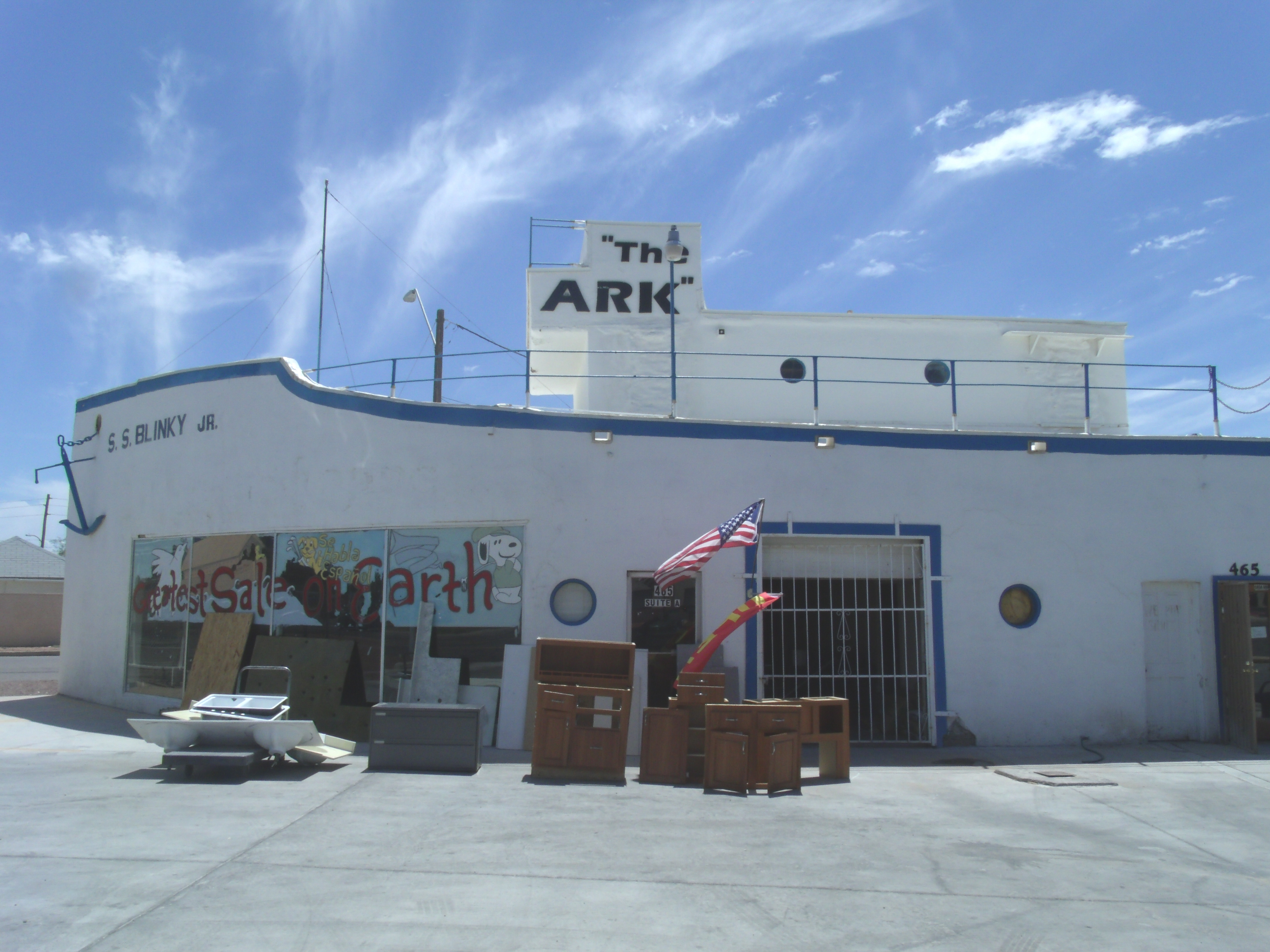
The S.S. Blinky Jr. Building.

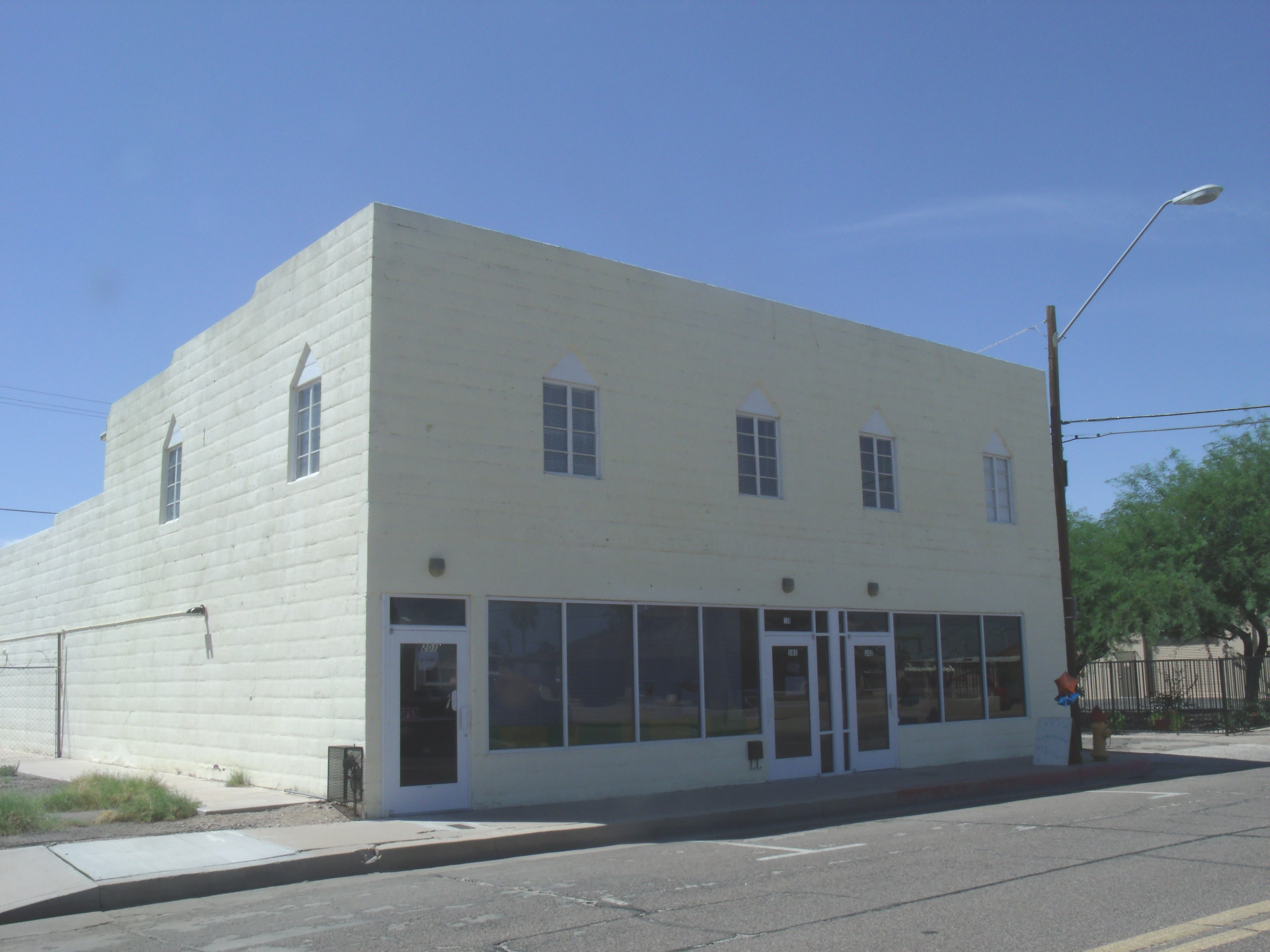
The V.W. Kilcrease Building.

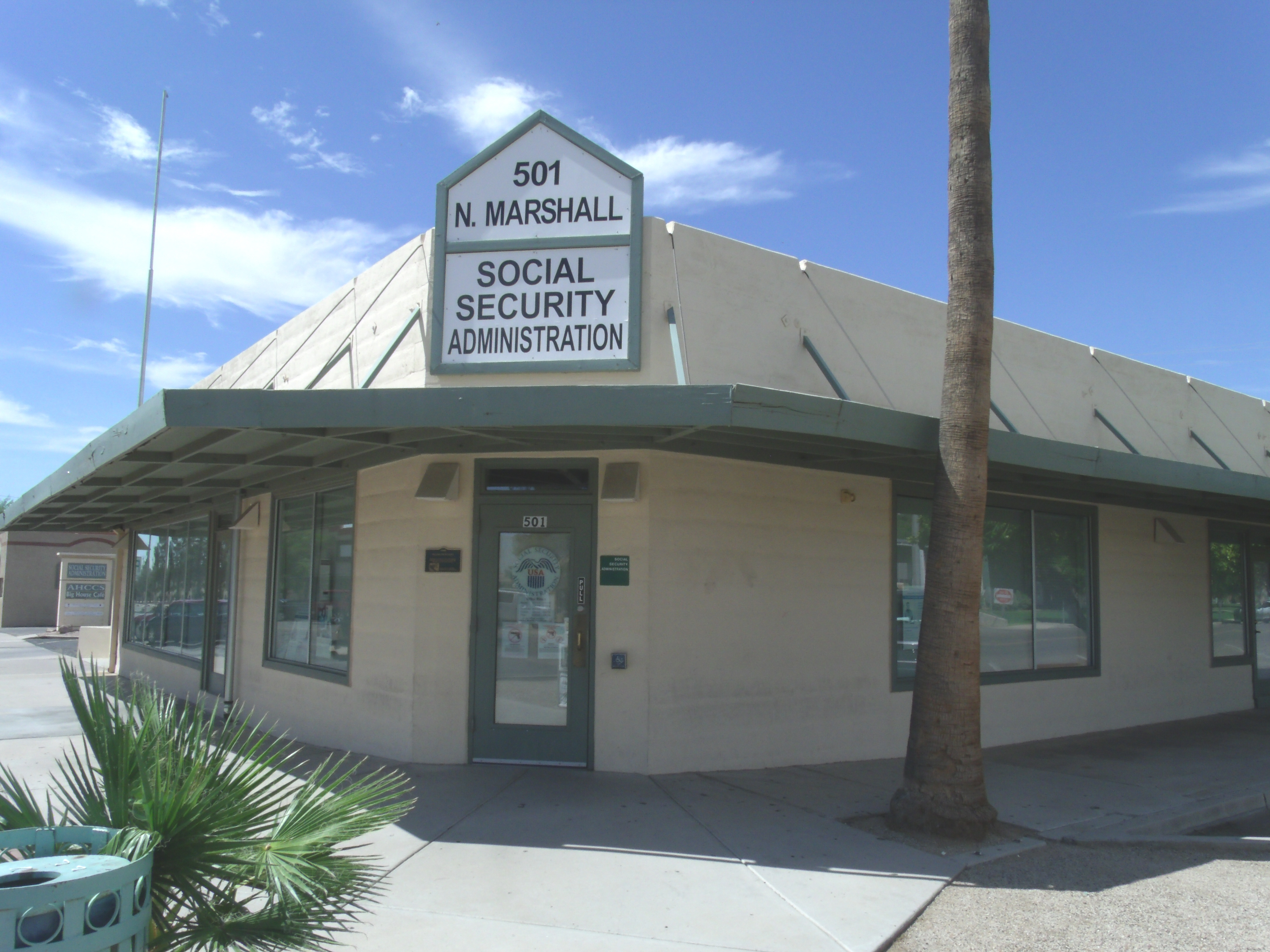
The William Cox Building.

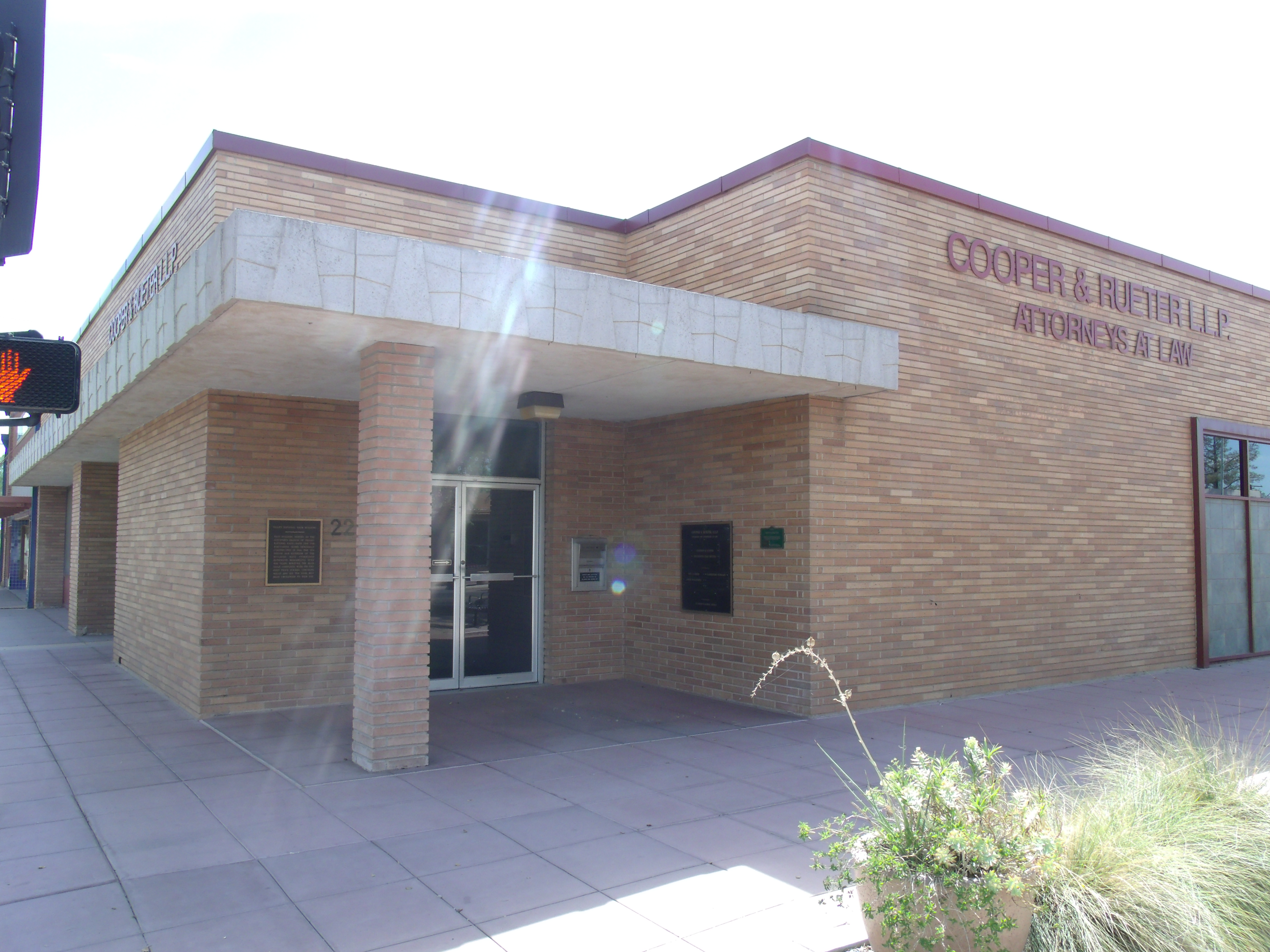
Valley National Bank.

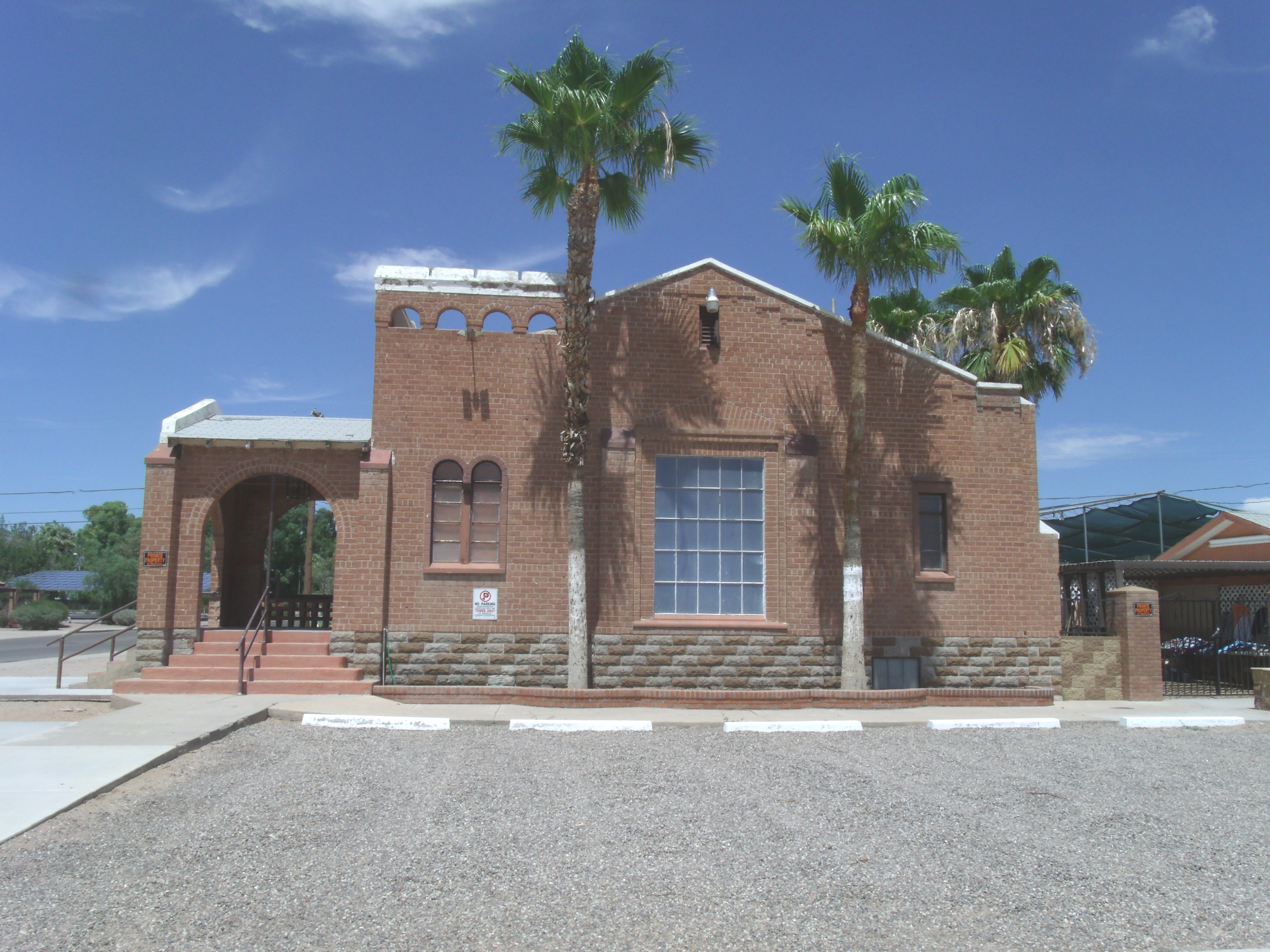
The Building at 400 East Third Street (once the Church of Christ).

=== Houses ===
The following is a brief description with the images of the houses listed:

- The Bien/McNatt House – was built in 1880 and is located at 208 W. 1st St. NRHP listed in 1985, reference #85000880.
- The Judge William T. Day House – was built in 1886 and is located at 306 W. 1st St. NRHP listed in 1985, reference #85001624.
- The Shonessy House – was built in 1900 and is located at 115 W. Main Ave. NRHP listed in 1985, reference #85000894.
- The Meehan/Gaar House – was built in 1903 and is located at 200 W. 1st St. Fanne Gaar bought the house in 1920. She became mayor of Casa Grande in 1927, a first for a woman in Arizona. Gaar lived in the house until her death in 1971. NRHP listed in 1985, reference #85000890.
- The BeDillions House – built in 1917 and located at 800 Park Ave. It is listed in the Casa Grande Historic Register.
- The House at 323 West Eighth St. – was built in 1918 and is located at 323 W. 8th St. NRHP listed in 2002, reference #02000744.
- The House at 736 North Center Avenue – was built in 1919 and is located at 736 N. Center Ave. It was listed in the NRHP in 2002, reference #02000738.
- The House at 320 West Eighth Street a.k.a. The Stone Barber Shop – was built in 1920 and is located at 320 W. 8th St. NRHP listed in 2002, reference #02000745.
- The Wilbur O. Bayless/Grasty House – was built in 1920 and is located at 221 N. Cameron St. NRHP listed in 1985, reference #85000879.
- The Gus Kratzka House (now the Casa Grande Art Museum) – was built in 1929 and is located at 319 W. 3rd Street. NRHP listed in 1985, reference #85000886.
- The Henry and Anna Kochsmeier House – was built in 1929 and is located at 403 W. 2nd Ave. NRHP listed in 2002, reference #02000746.
- The Stone Bungalow – was built in 1921 and is located at 515 E. 3rd St. NRHP listed in 1985, reference #85000995.
- The Earl Bayless House – was built in 1922 and is located at 211 N. Cameron St. NRHP listed in 1985, reference #85000878.
- Extension of the Earl Bayless House – was used as a store and is located at 211 N. Cameron St. NRHP listed in 1985, reference #85000878.
- The House at North Lehmberg Avenue a.k.a. Spanish Eclectic House – was built in 1925 and is located at 1105 N. Lehmberg Ave. NRHP listed in 2002, reference #02000735.
- The Period Revival House – was built in 1927 and is located at 905 N. Lehmberg St. NRHP listed in 1985, reference #850001623.
- The Vasquez House – was built in 1927 and is located at 114 E. Florence Boulevard. NRHP listed in 1985, reference #85000897.
- The House at 59 North Brown Avenue a.k.a. Fieldstone House – was built in 1928 and is located at 59 N. Brown Ave. NRHP listed in 2002, reference #02000742.
- The Benjamin Templeton House – was built in 1929 and is located at 923 N. Center Ave. NRHP listed in 2002, reference #02000739
- The House at 317 East Eighth Street – was built in 1929 and is located at 317 E. 8th St. NRHP listed in 2002, reference #02000753.
- The Emil and Caroline Meyer House – was built in 1920 and is located at 222 W. 9th St. NRHP listed in 2002, reference #0200073.
- The Dr. H. B. Lehmberg House – was built in 1929 and is located at 929 N. Lehmberg St. NRHP listed in 1985, reference #85000888.
- The White House – was built in 1929 and is located at 901 N. Morrison. NRHP listed in 1985, reference #85000899.
- The C. J. (Blinky) Wilson House was built in 1929 and is located at 223 W. 10th St. NRHP listed in 1985, reference #85000900.
- The Walter Wilbur House – was built in 1939 and is located at 904 E. 8th St. NRHP listed in 2002, reference #02000752.
Historic houses in Casa Grande
NRHP
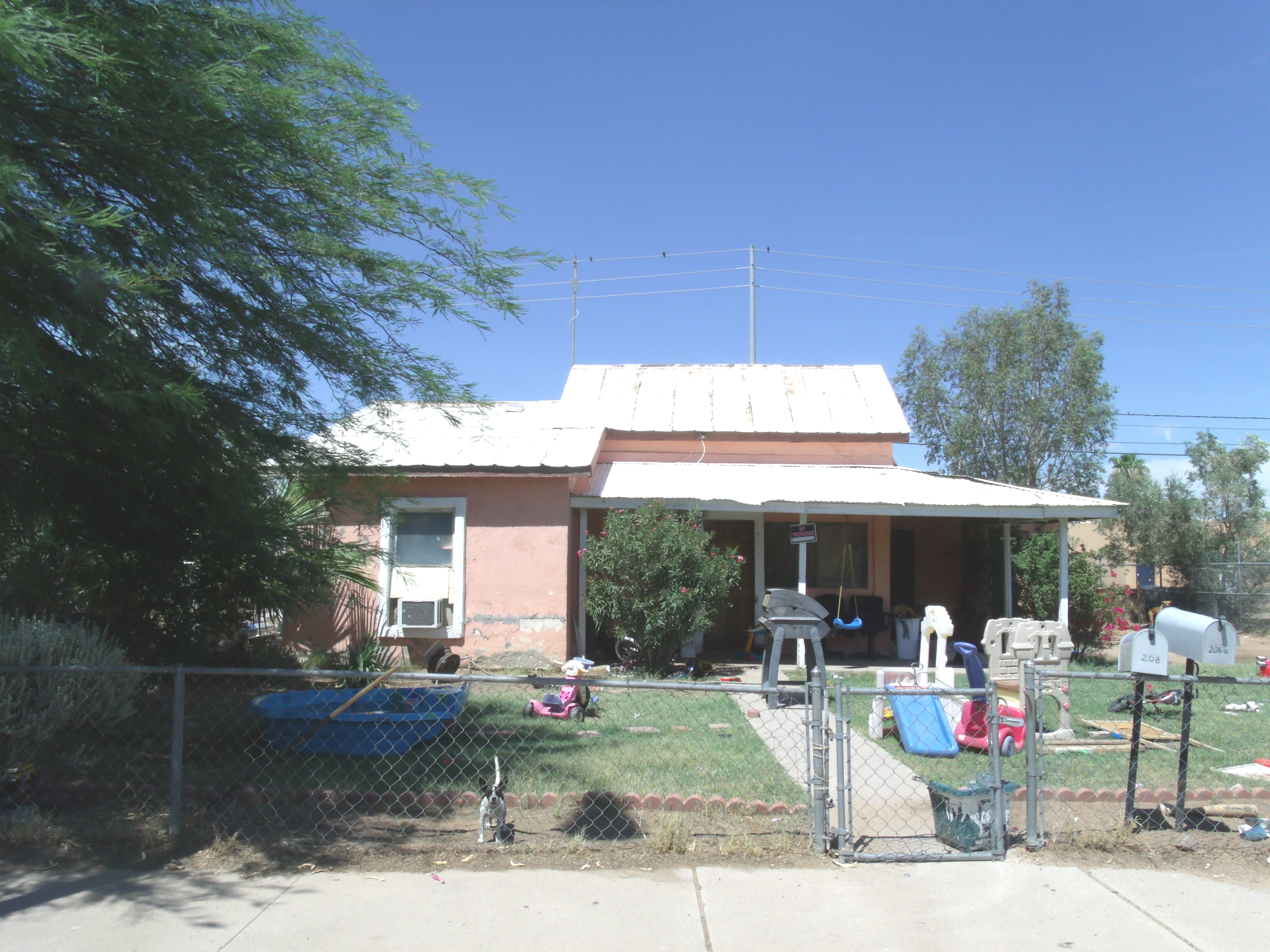
The Bien/McNatt House.

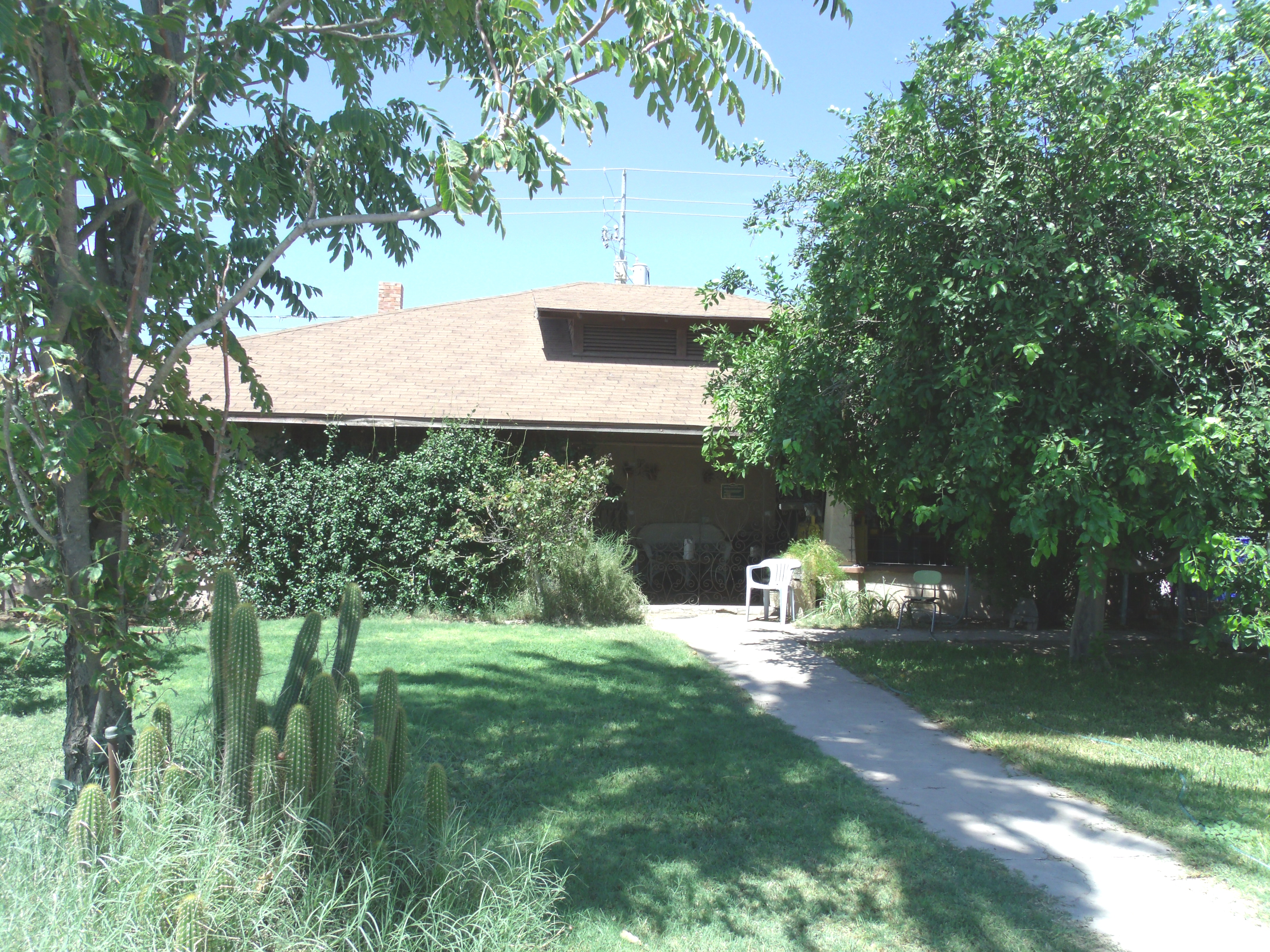
The Judge William T. Day House.

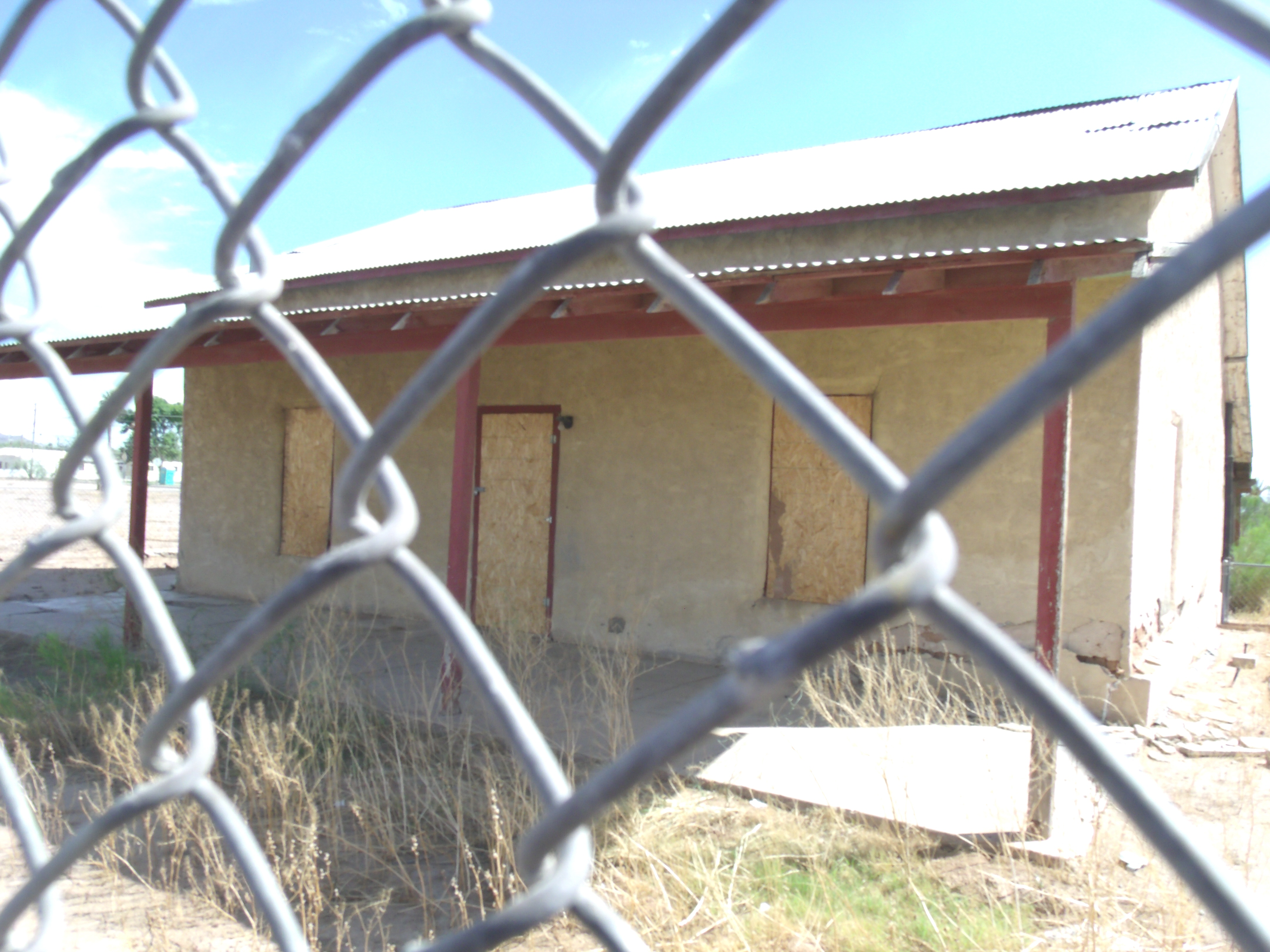
The Shonessy House.

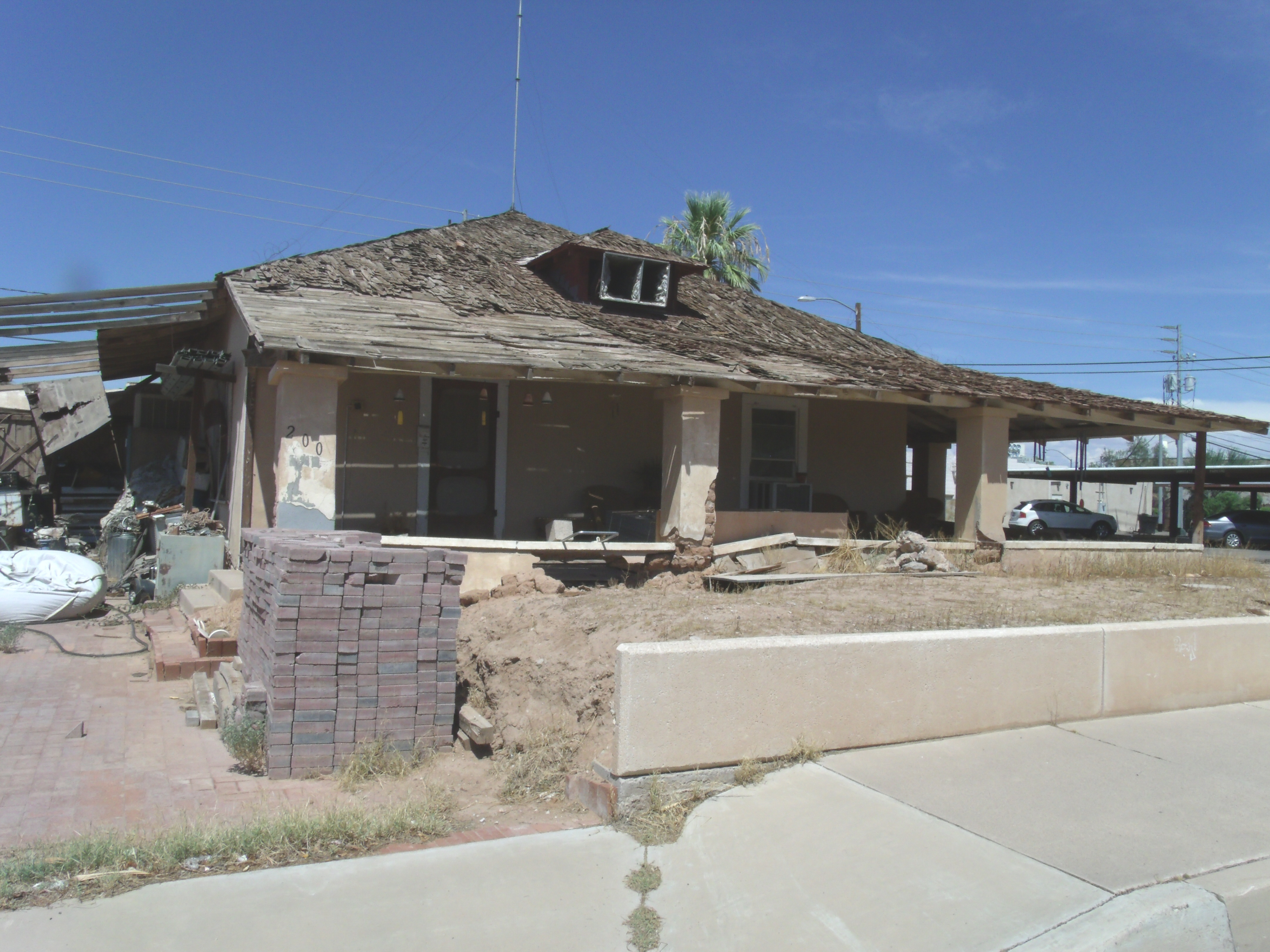
The Meehan/Gaar House.

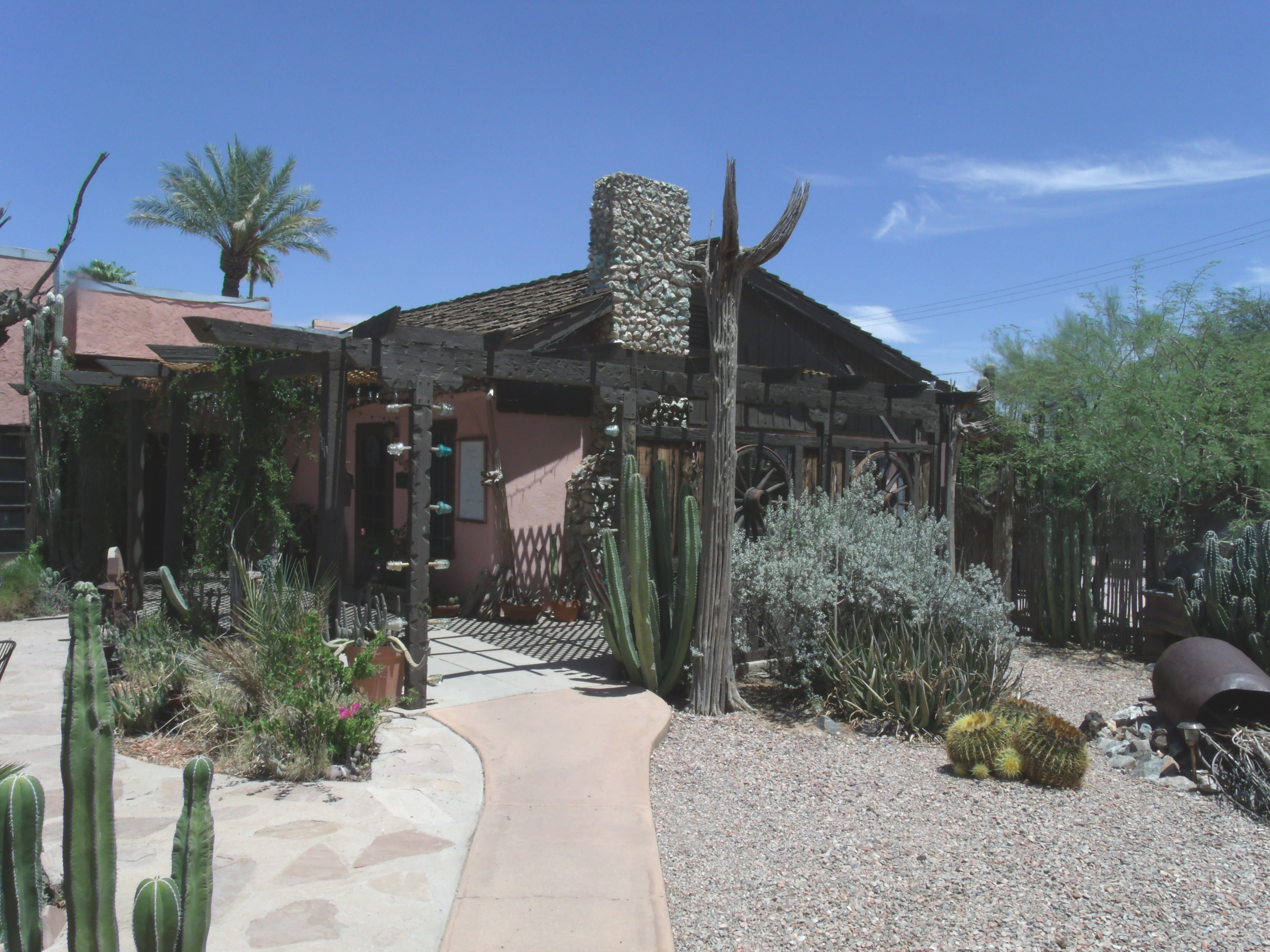
The BeDillions House.

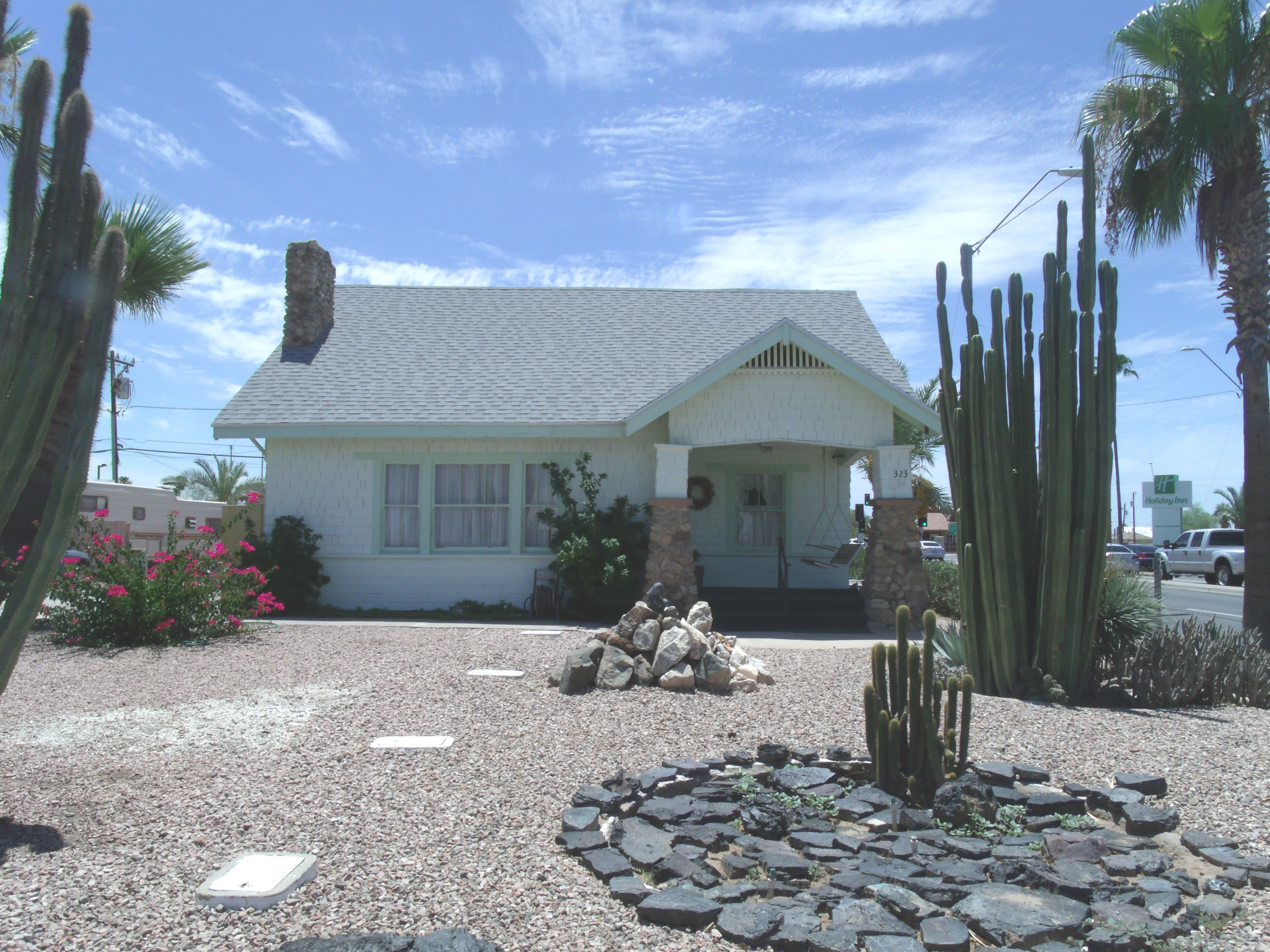
The House at 323 West Eighth St..

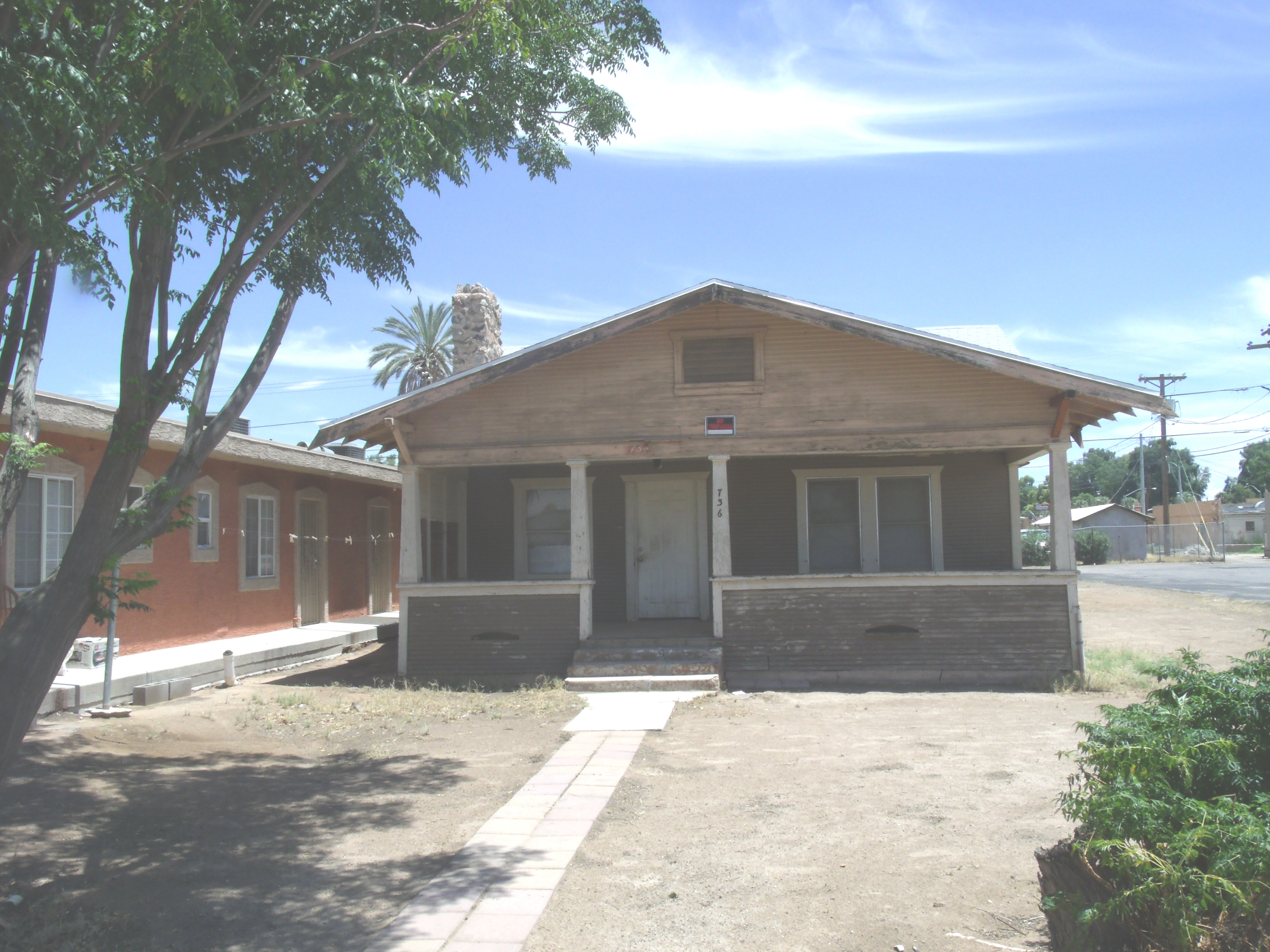
The House at 736 North Center Avenue.

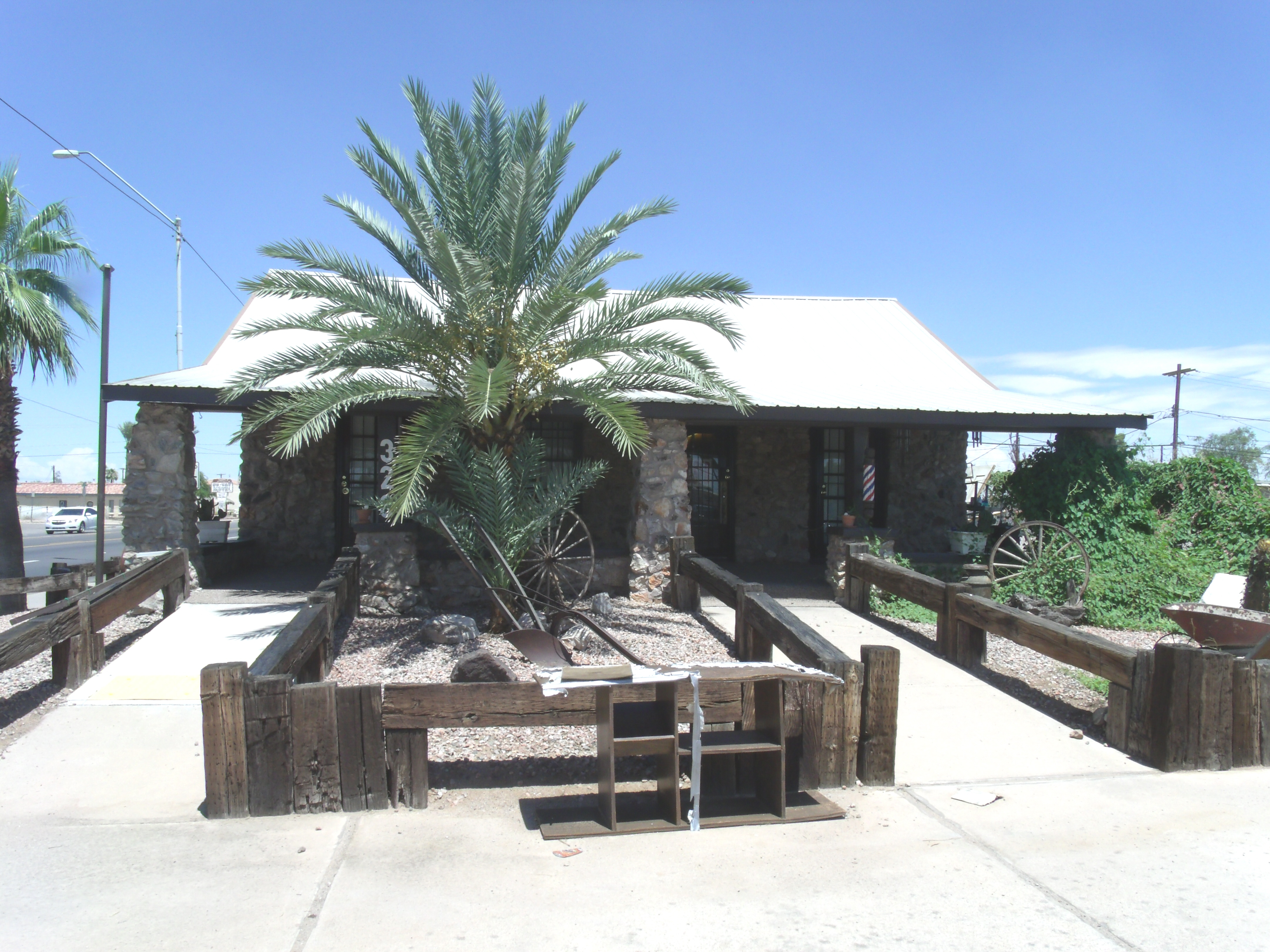
The House at 320 West Eighth Street a.k.a. The Stone Barber Shop.

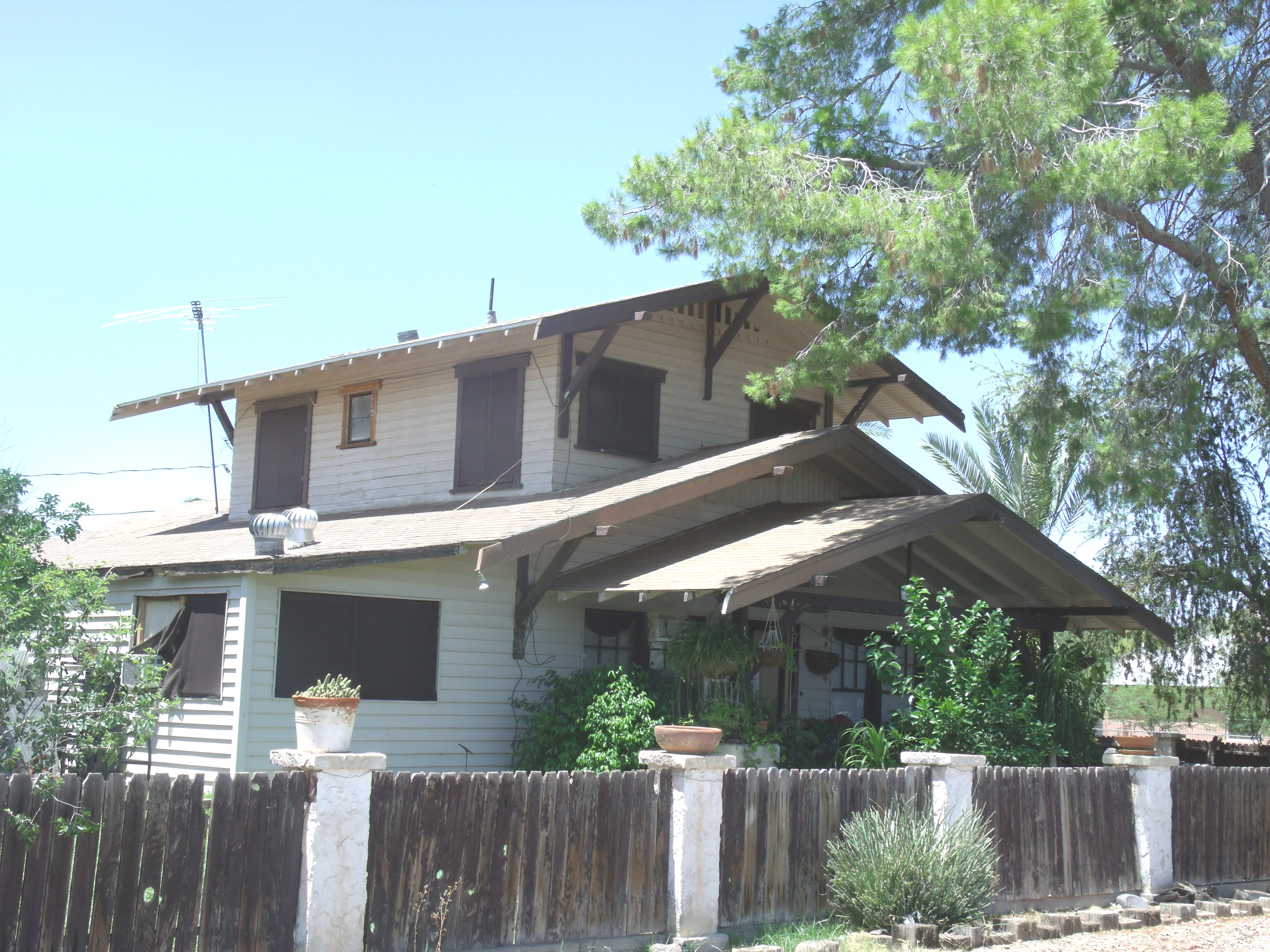
The Wilbur O. Bayless/Grasty House.

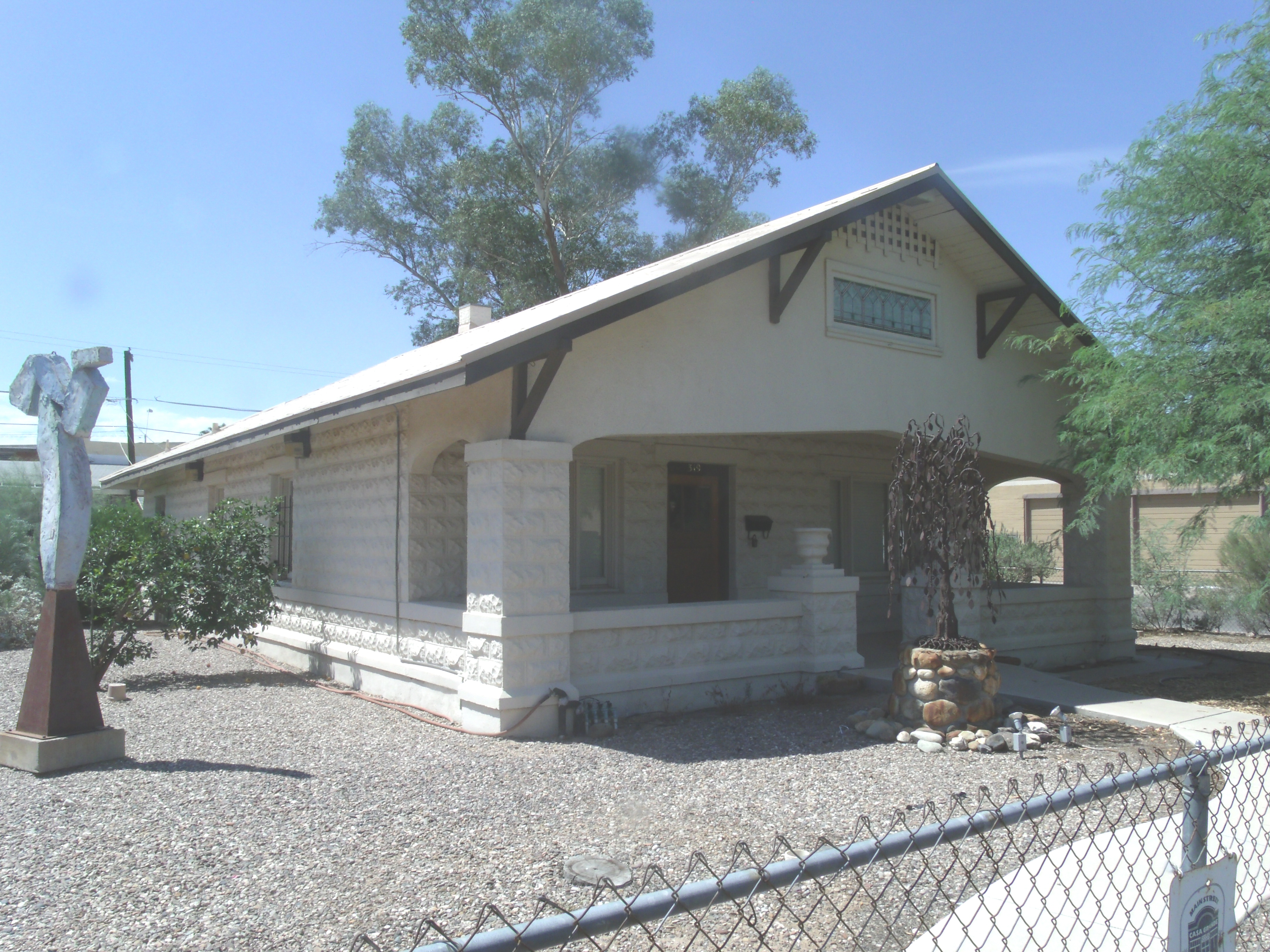
The Gus Kratzka House (now the Casa Grande Art Museum).

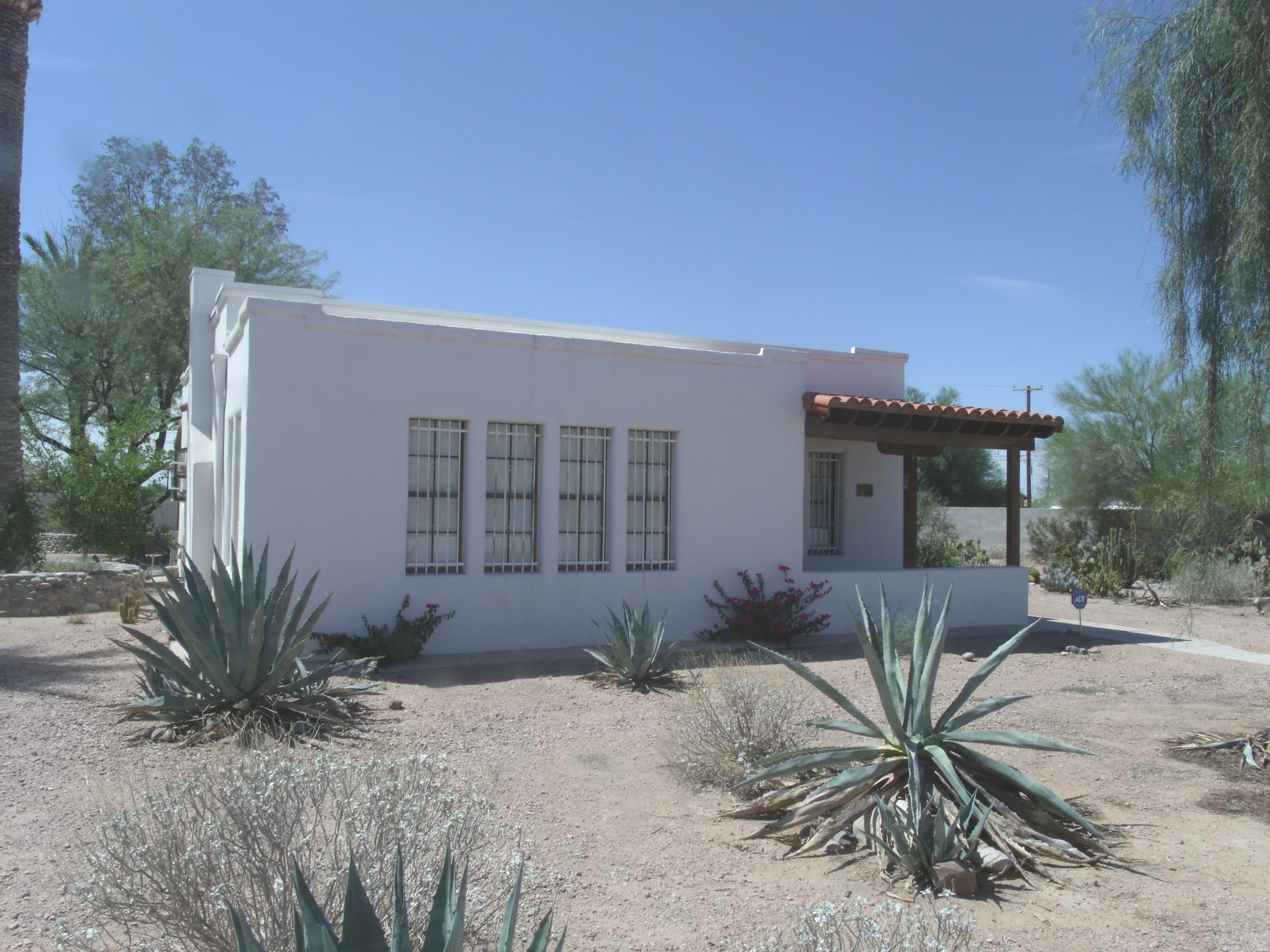
The Henry and Anna Kochsmeier House.

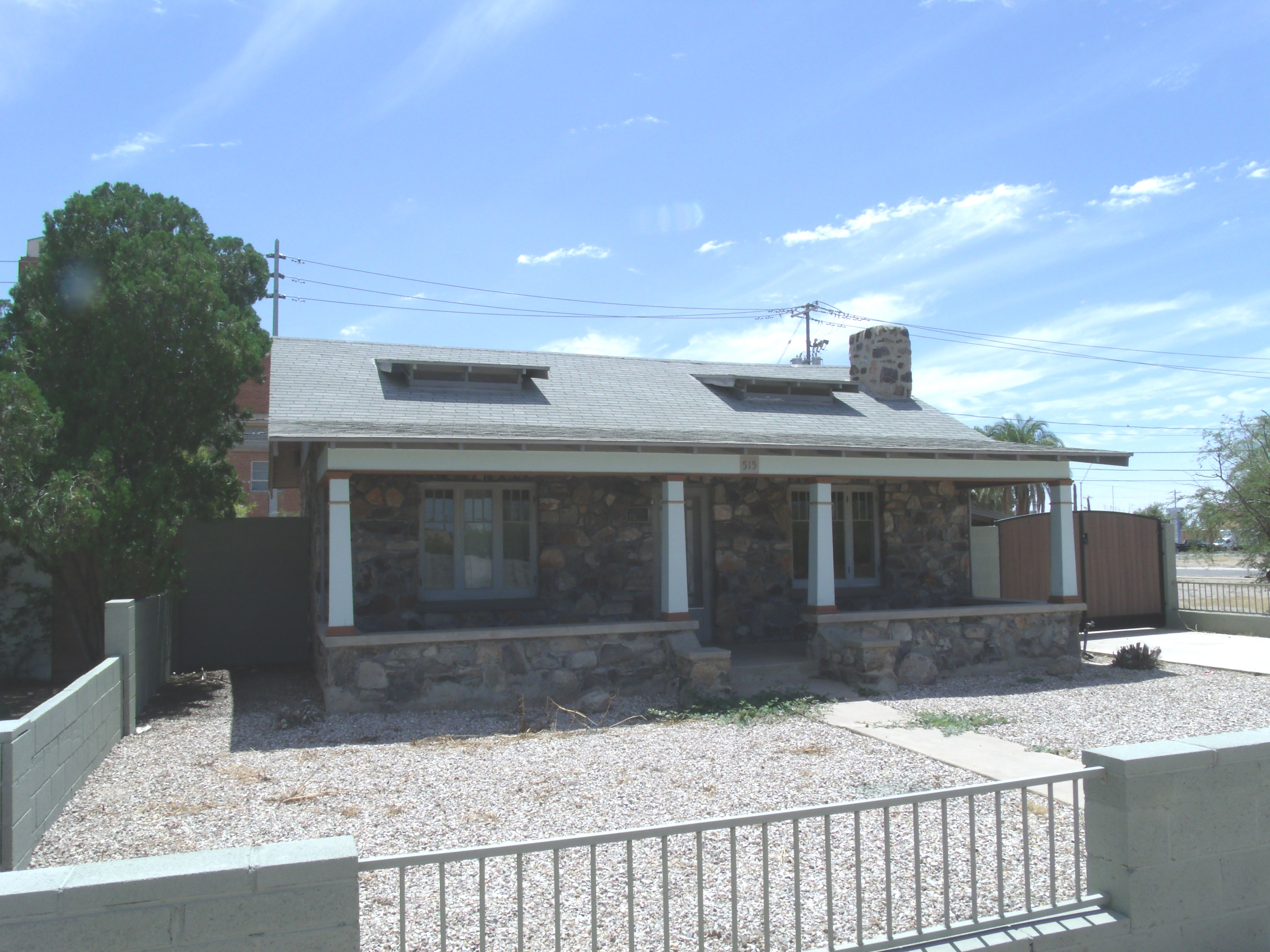
The Stone Bungalow.

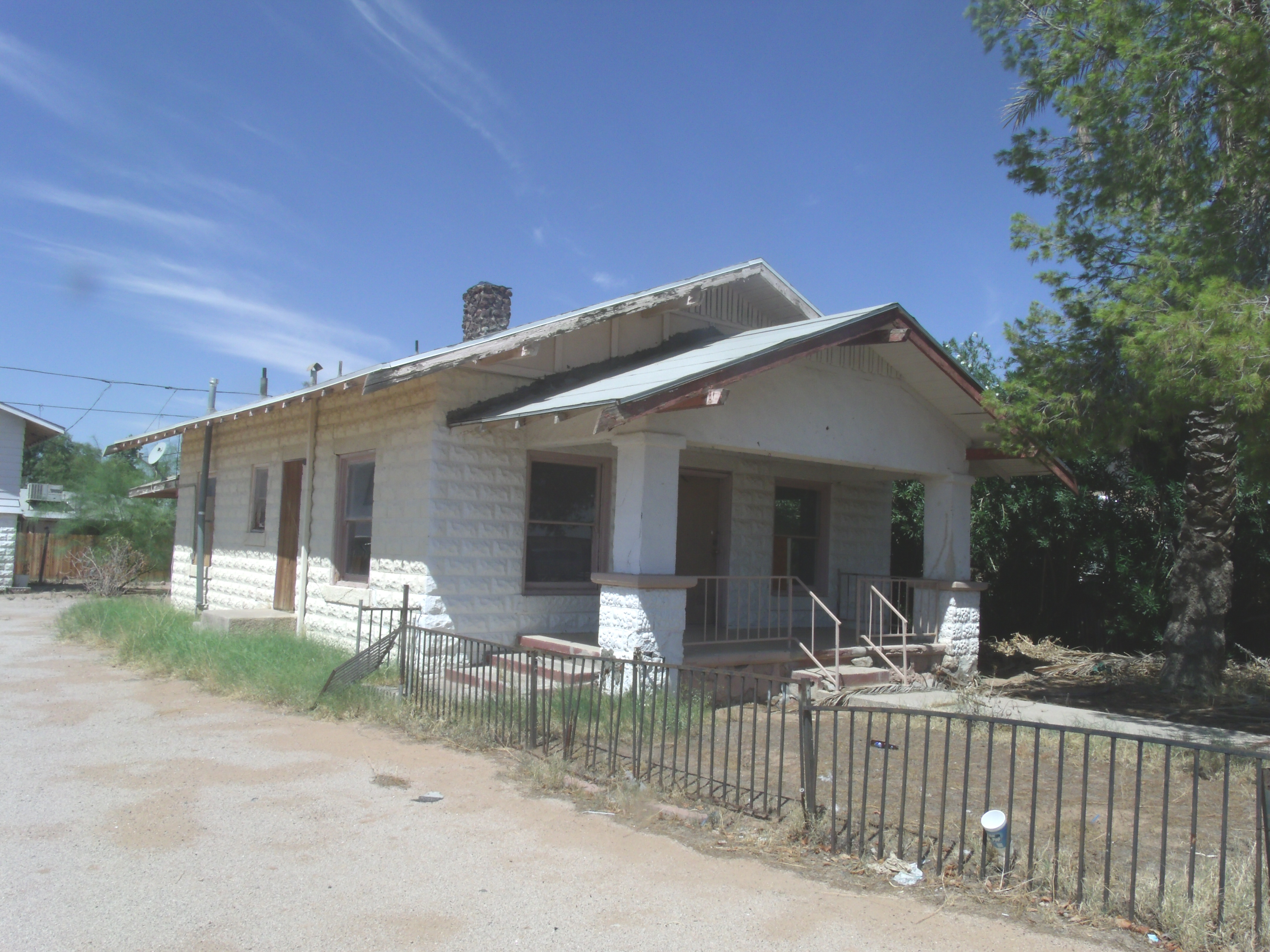
The Earl Bayless House.

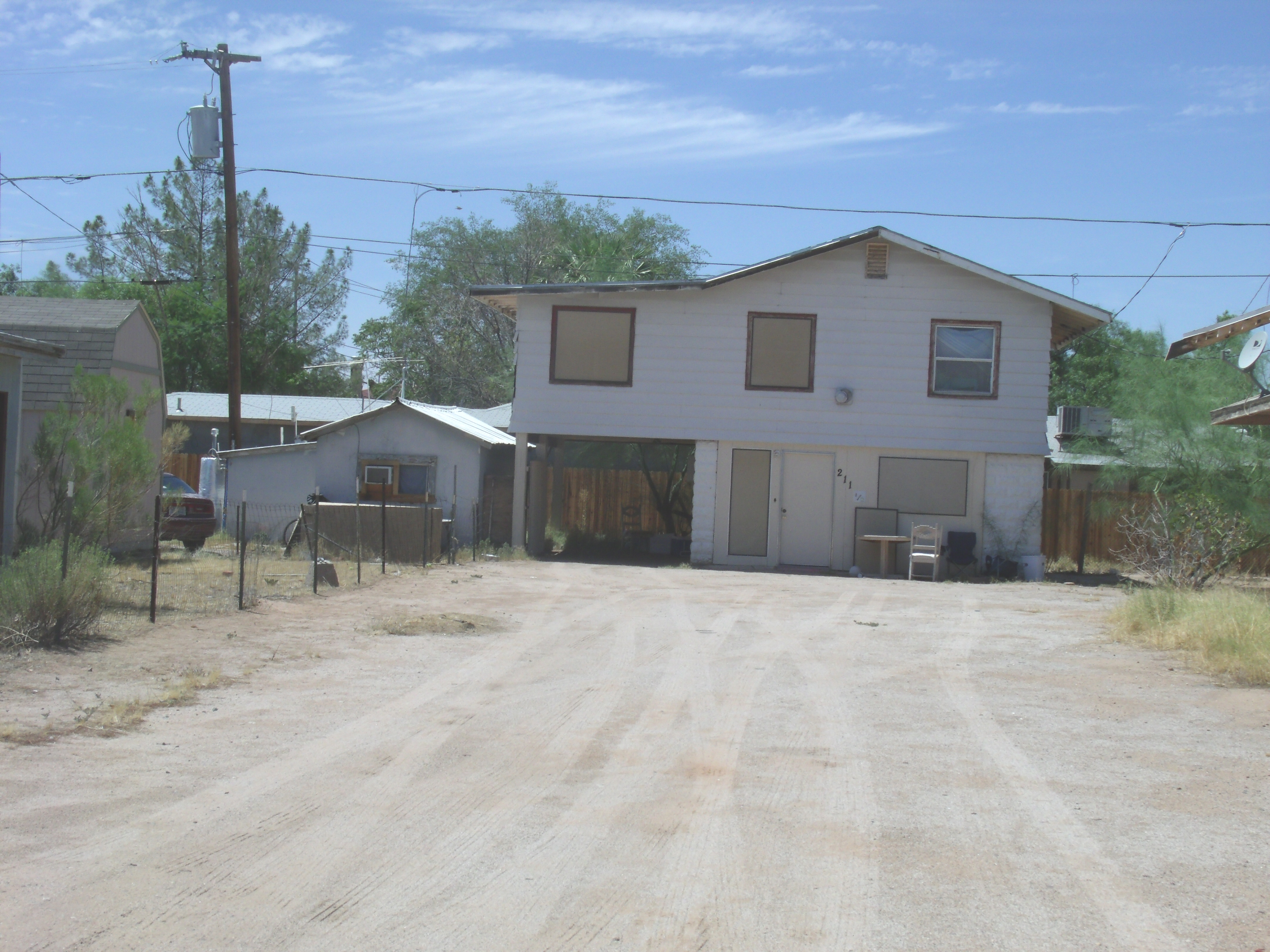
Extension of the Earl Bayless House.

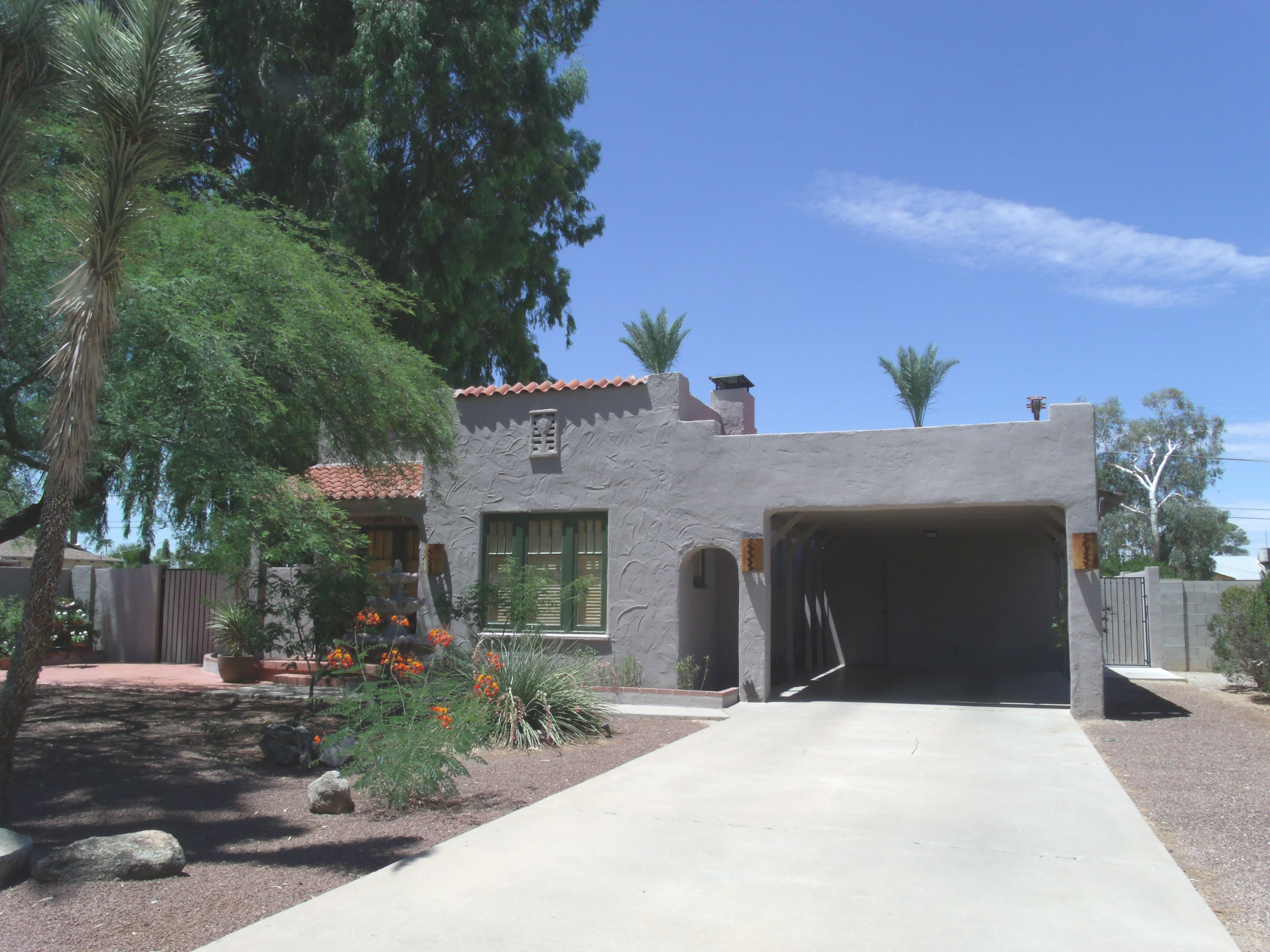
The House at North Lehmberg Avenue a.k.a. Spanish Eclectic House.

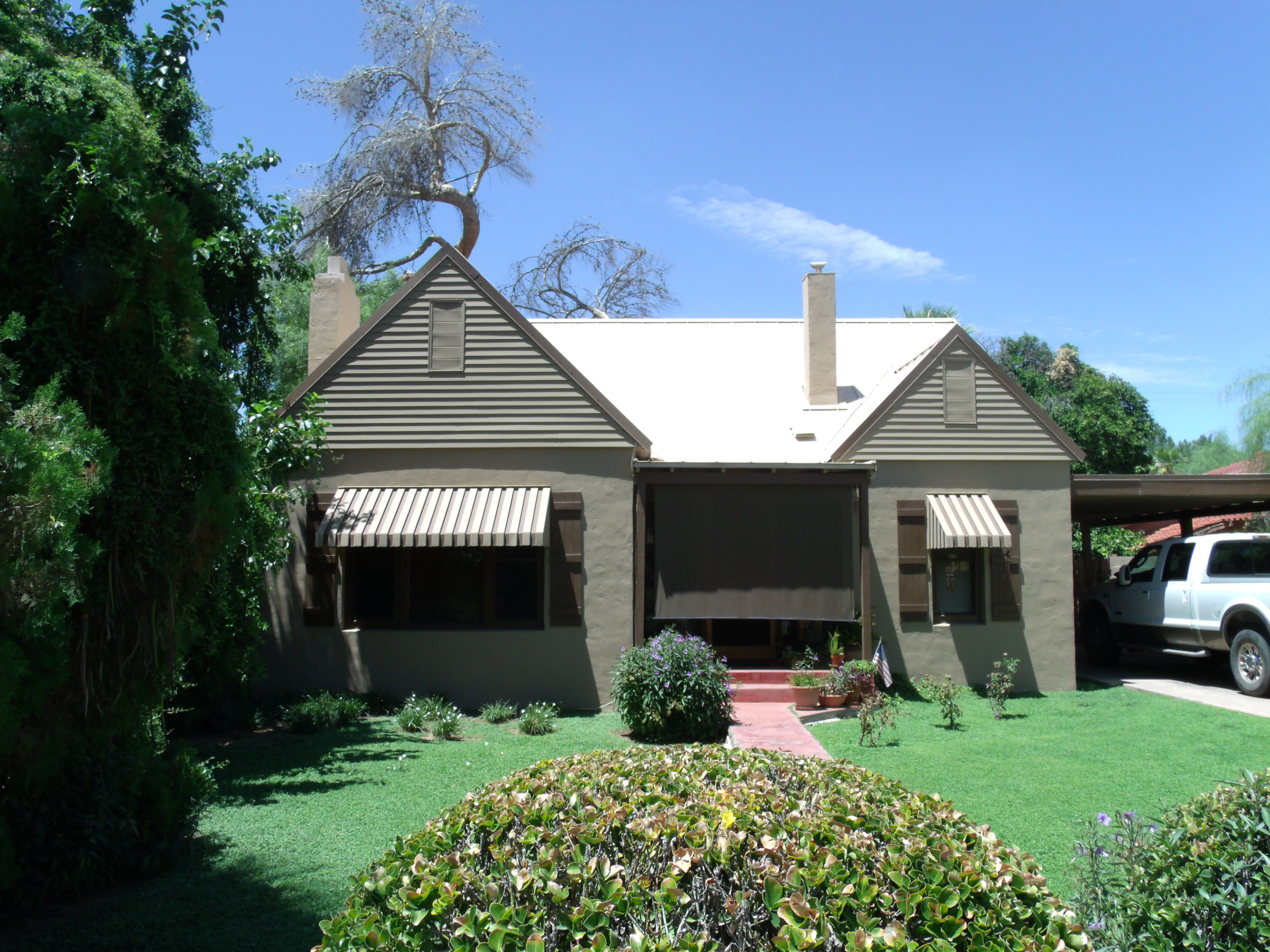
The Period Revival House.

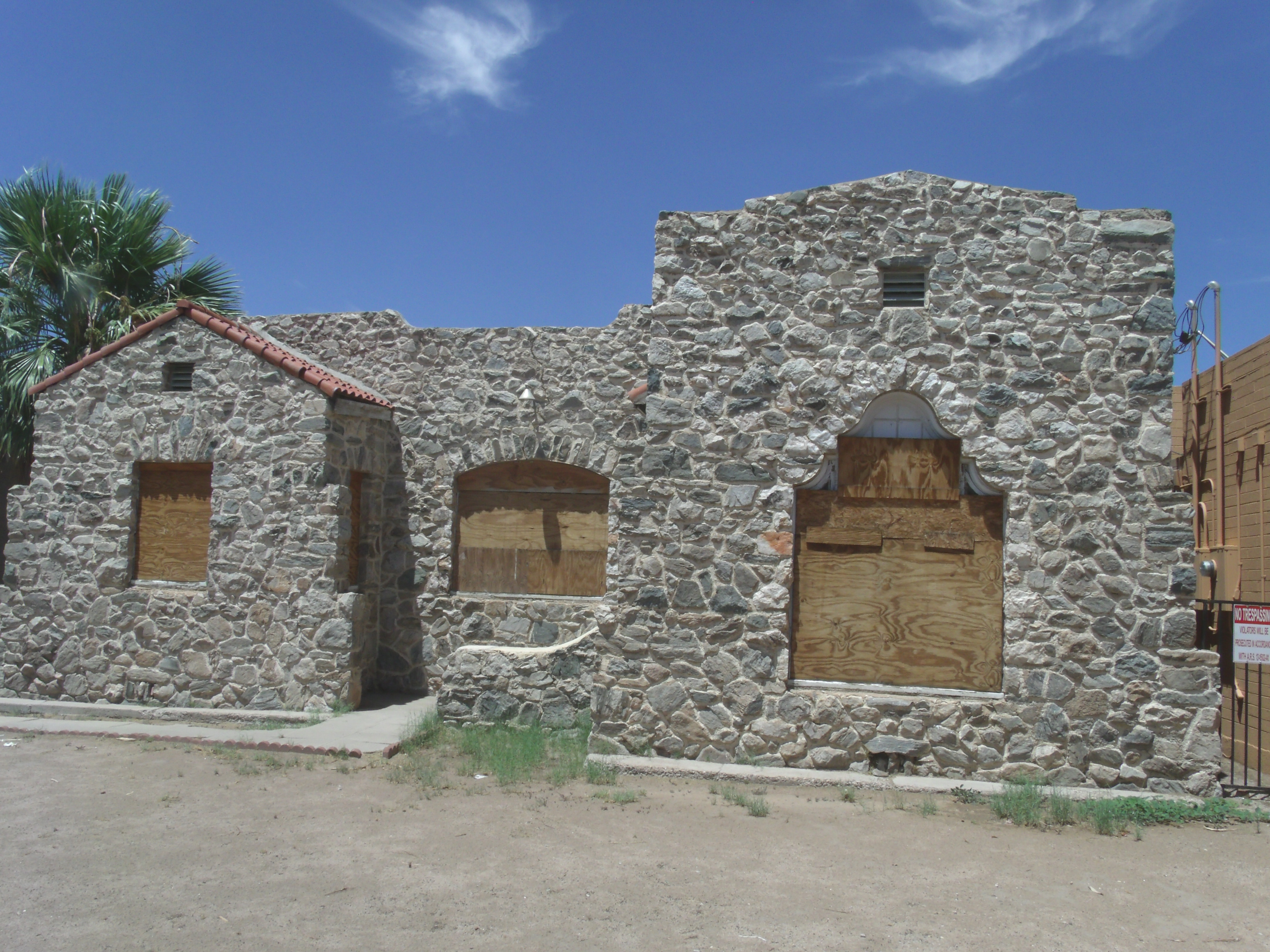
The Vasquez House.

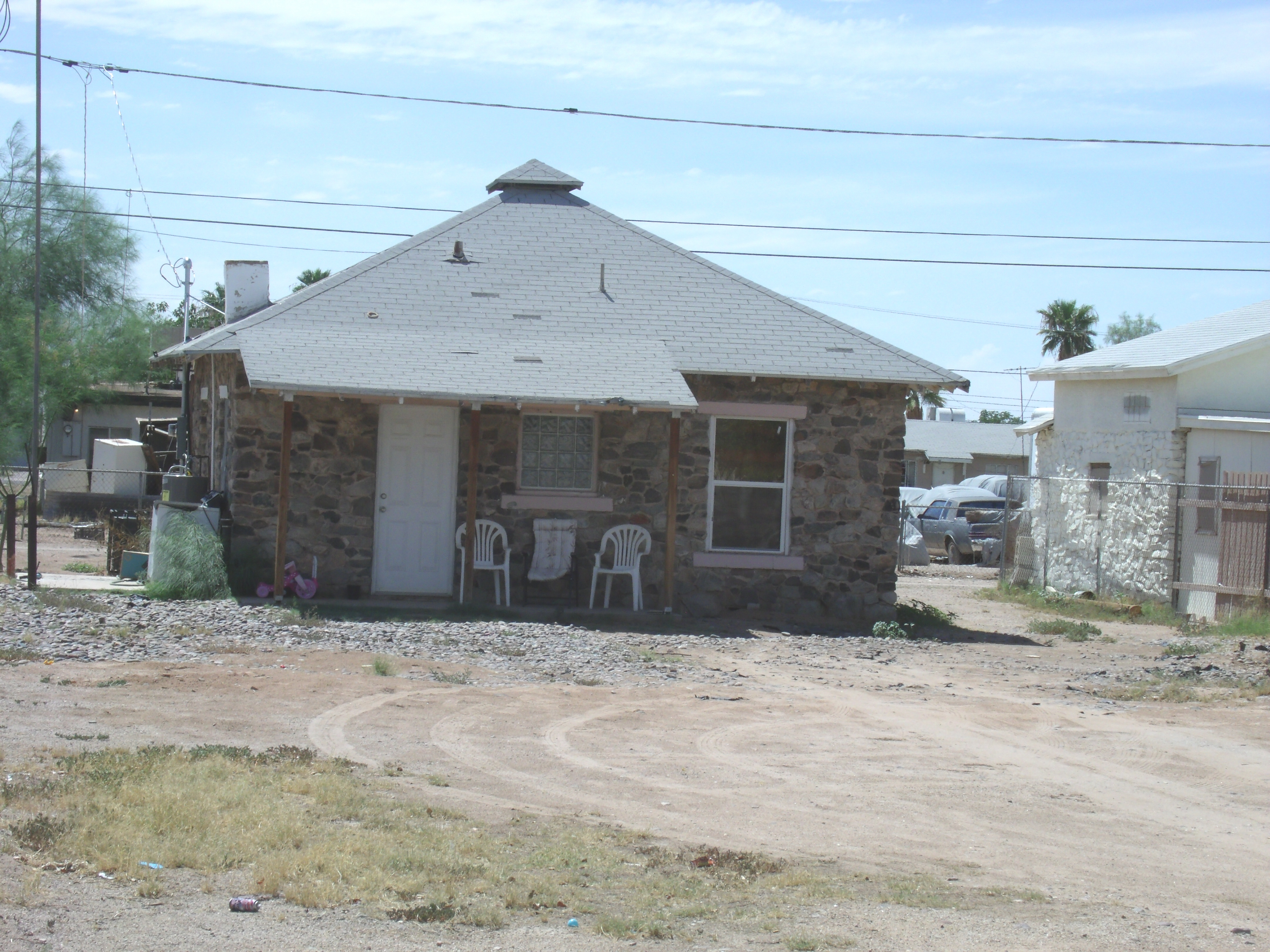
The House at 59 North Brown Avenue a.k.a. Fieldstone House.

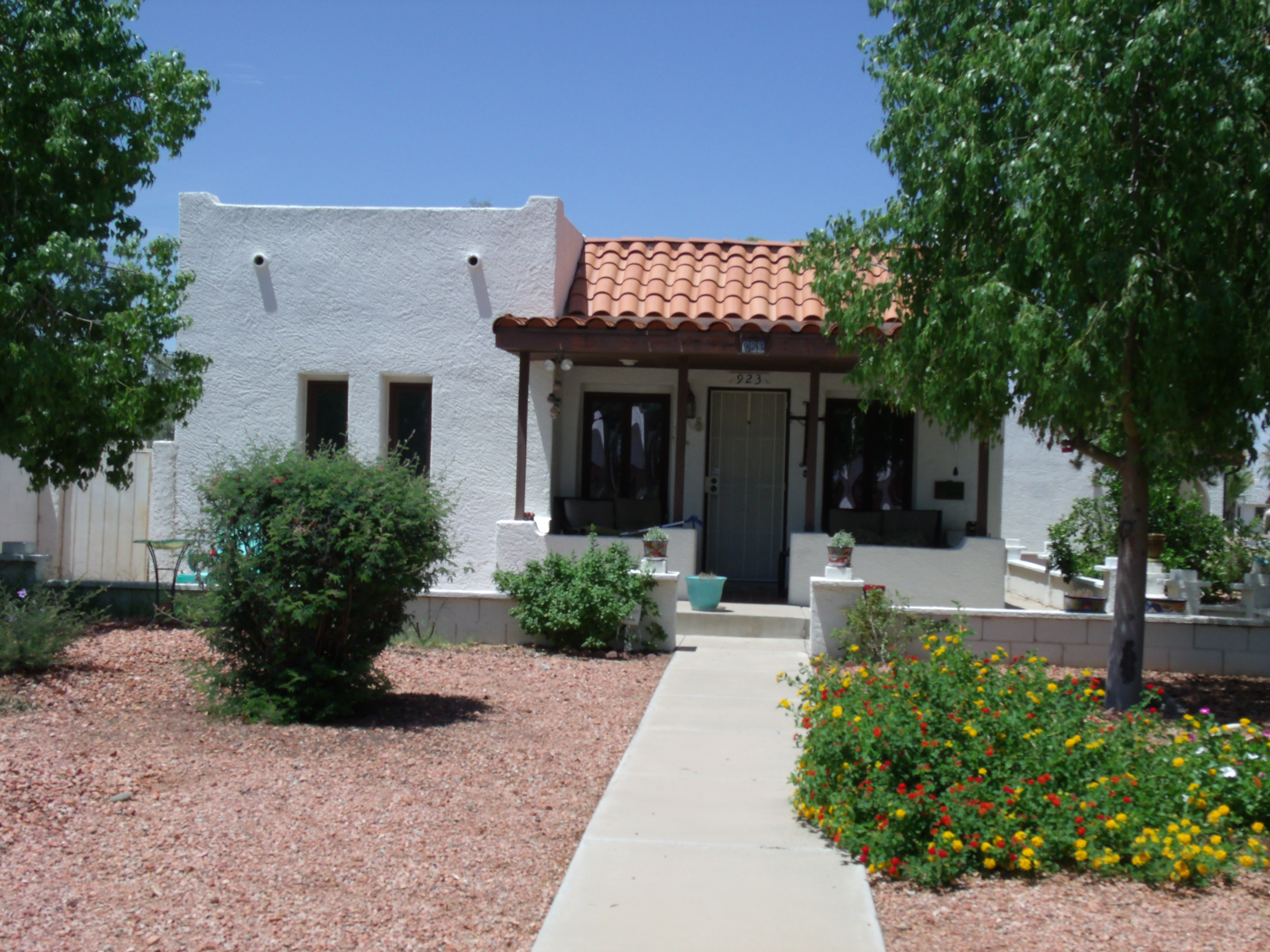
The Benjamin Templeton House.

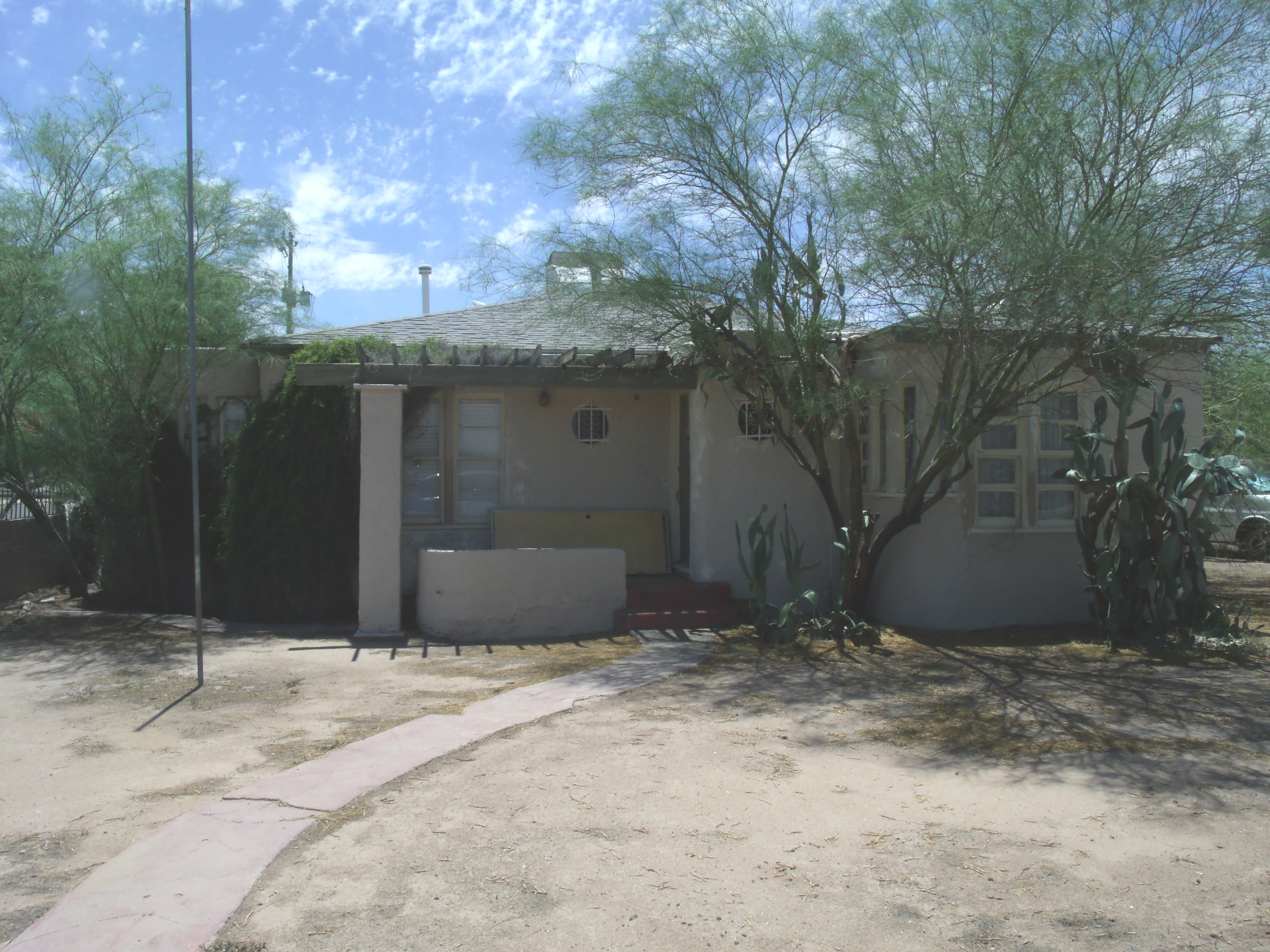
The House at 317 East Eighth Street.

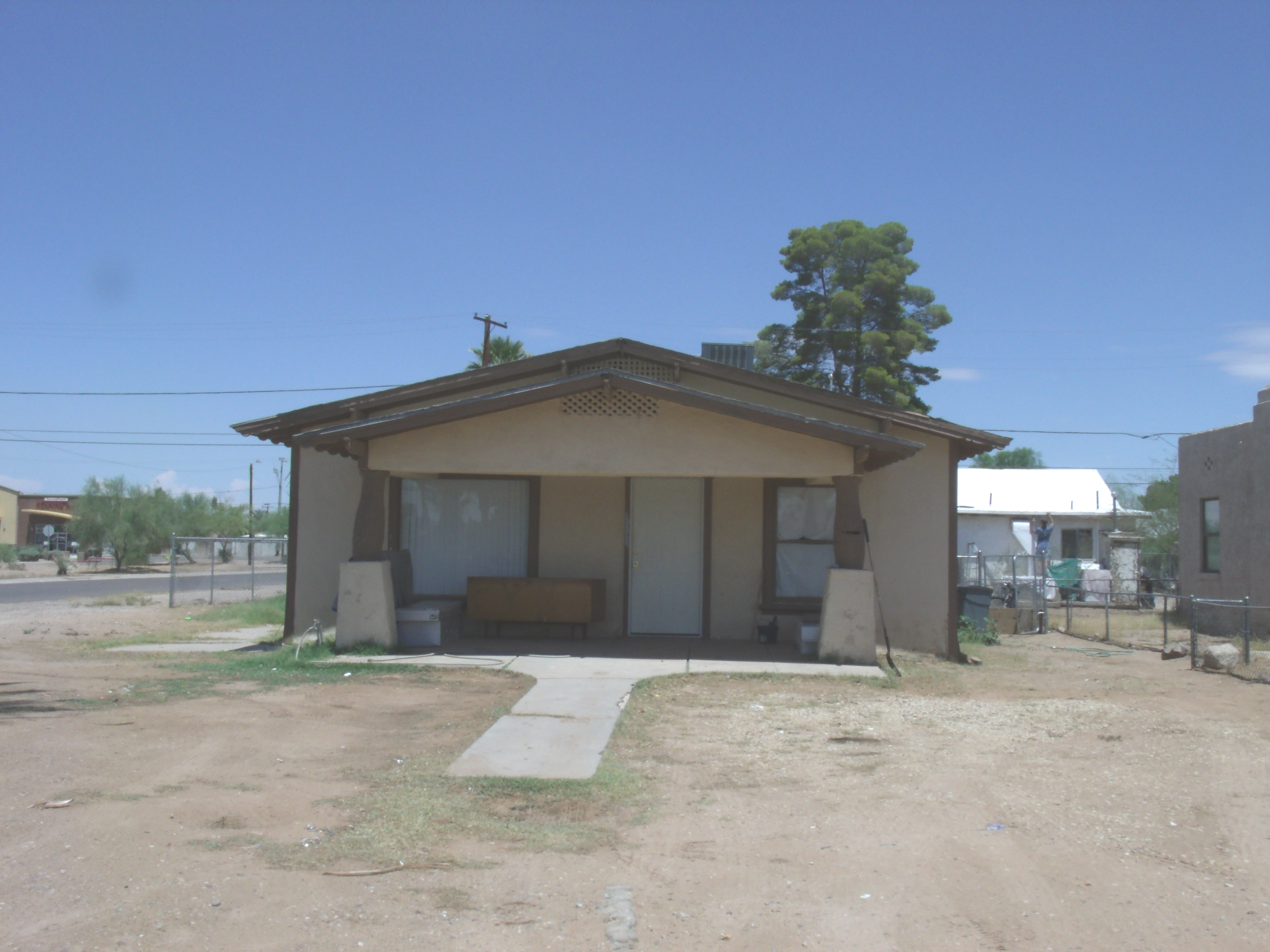
The Emil and Caroline Meyer House.

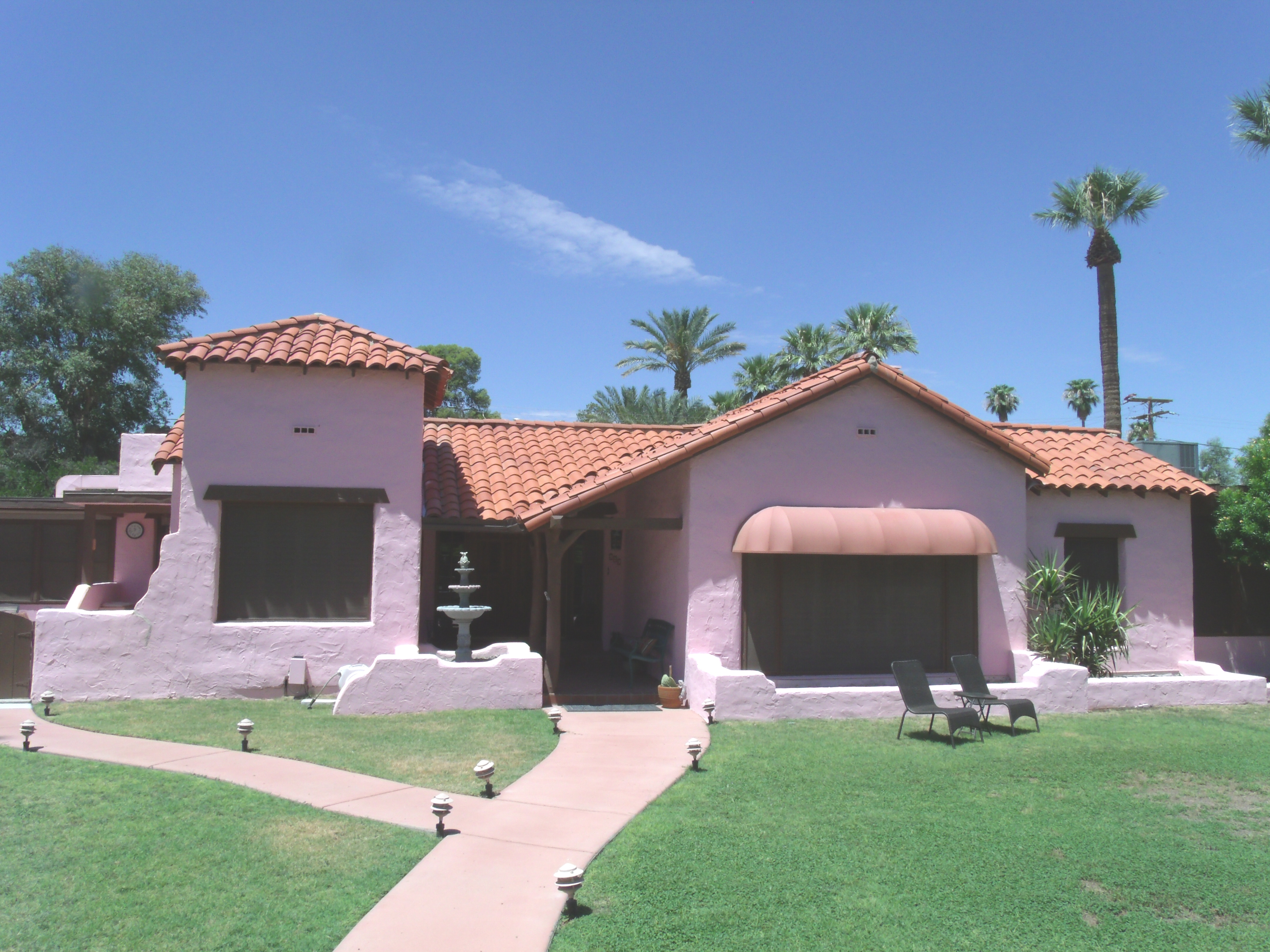
The Dr. H. B. Lehmberg House.

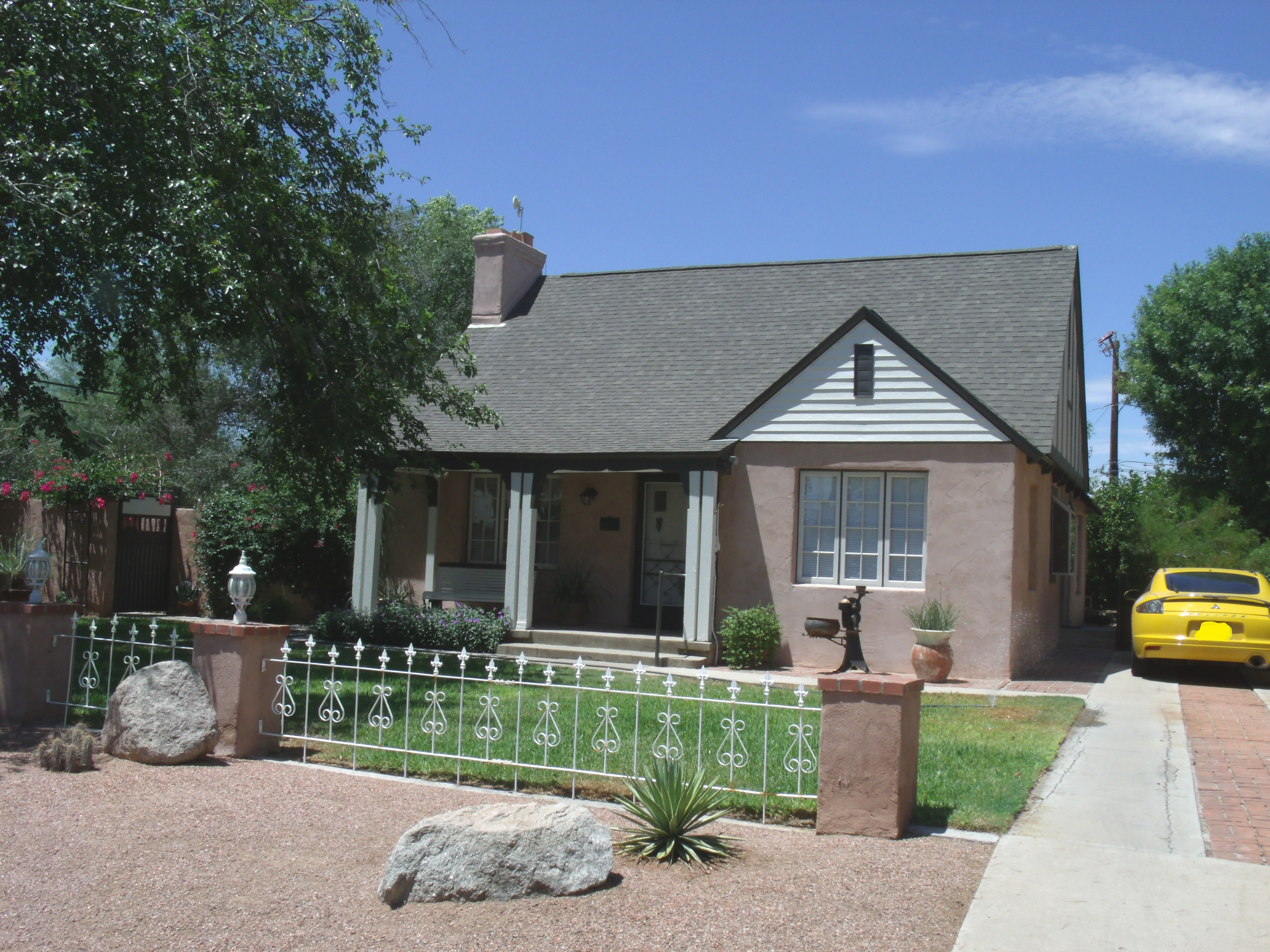
The White House.

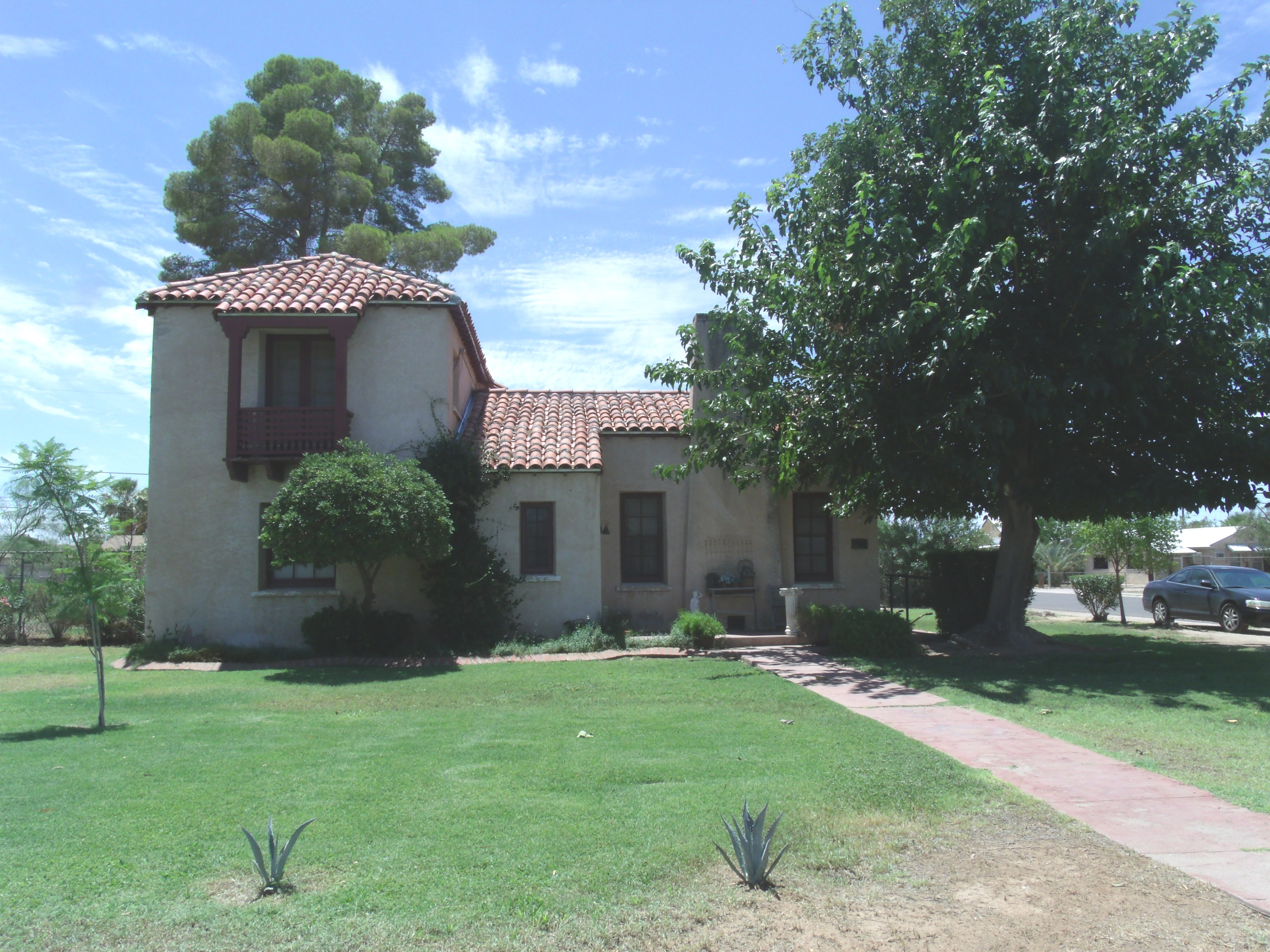
The C. J. (Blinky) Wilson House.

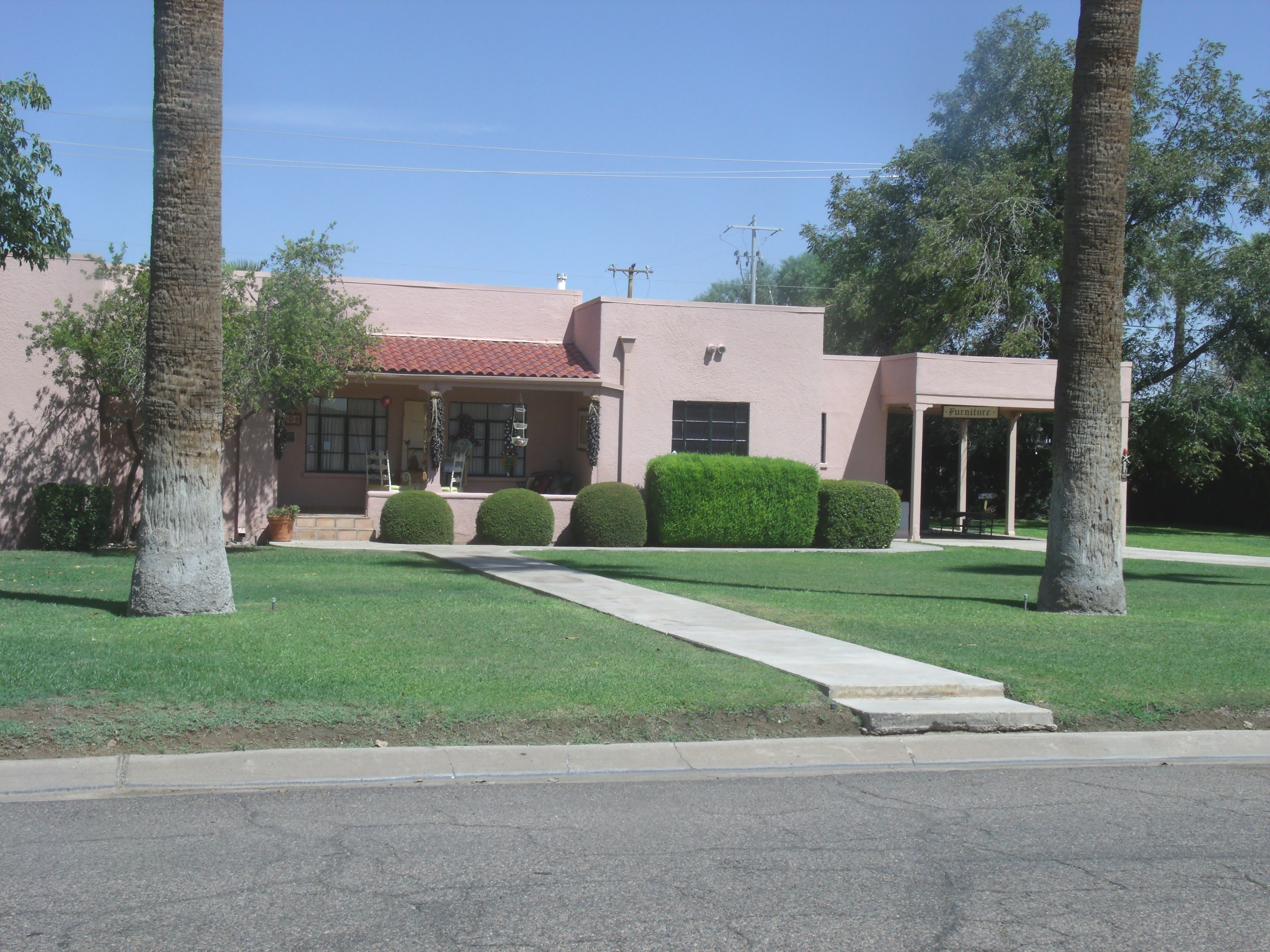
The Walter Wilbur House.

== Historic fire truck ==
- Historic Casa Grande Fire Department Engine #1 – a 1928 American LaFrance fire truck is on display in the Casa Grande Historical Society Museum at 110 W Florence Blvd.
Fire truck
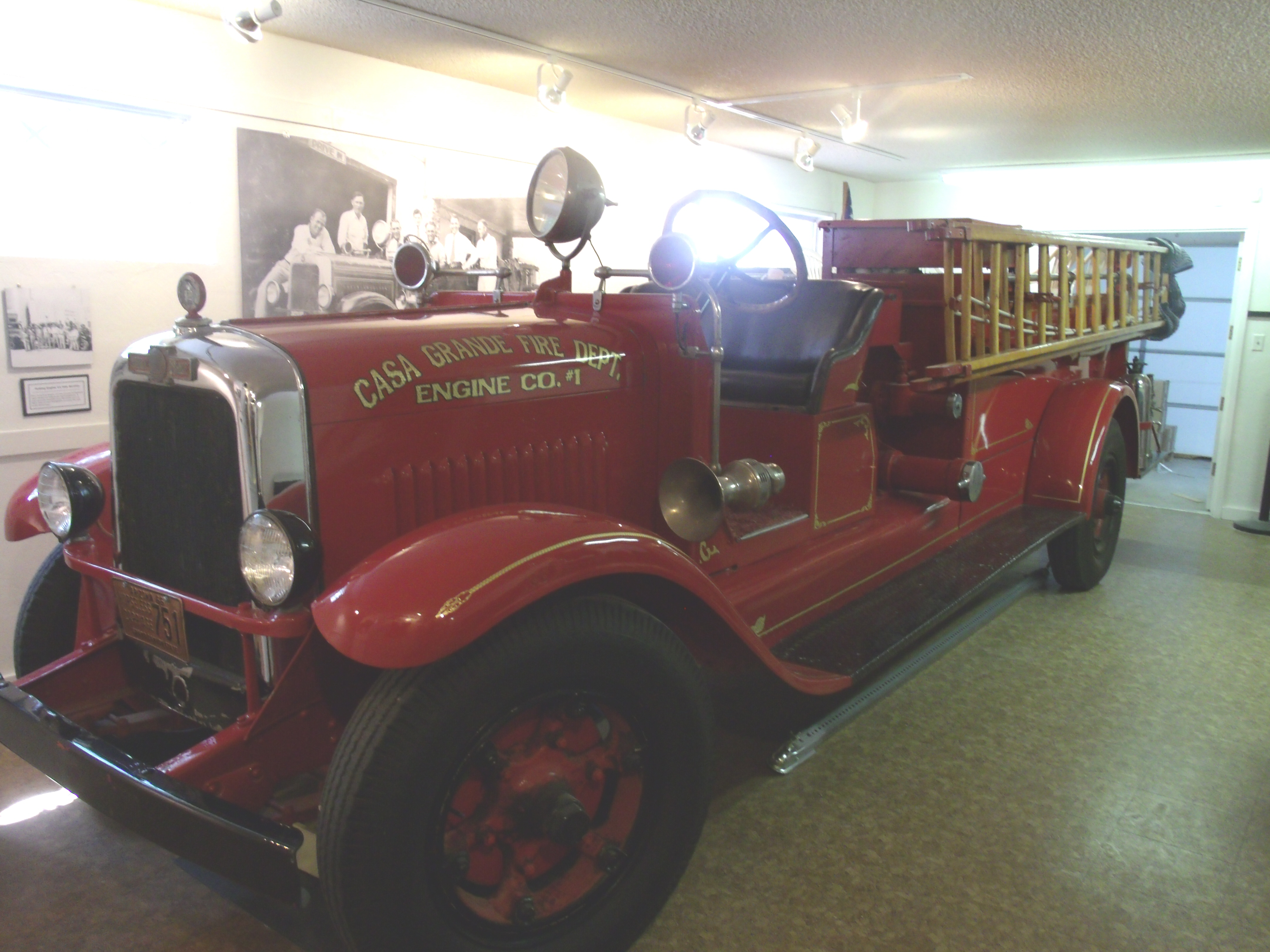
Historic Casa Grande Fire Department Engine #1.

== Corona Satellite Calibration Targets ==
The Corona Satellite Calibration Targets refer to two hundred and seventy two (272) concrete markers, built in the 1960s in the desolate Arizona desert, in and around Casa Grande, Arizona that helped to calibrate satellites of the Corona spy satellite program. They are large concrete crosses in the ground with a resemblance of a large Maltese Cross. The targets are only visible if one walked up to them or passed over them from a great height, like space.

Each of the targets has a manhole with a cement cover and rebar handles. The manhole is located on the west arm of the cross. According to Gary Morgan, member of the Cold War Museum in Warrenton VA., the 6 pieces of rebar, which protrude at an equal distance from each other, may have been used to hold laser lighting to give a more accurate fix on each target.

The targets were abandoned following the end of the program in 1972. About half of the targets were either destroyed or demolished. Pictured are two of the remaining targets which have survived. The first one pictured (Y47) is located on the southeast corner of South Montgomery and West Cornman Roads and the second (Y4-) one on the northeast corner of West Cornman Road and Carmel Blvd.

Two Corona Satellite Calibration Targets in Casa Grande, Arizona.
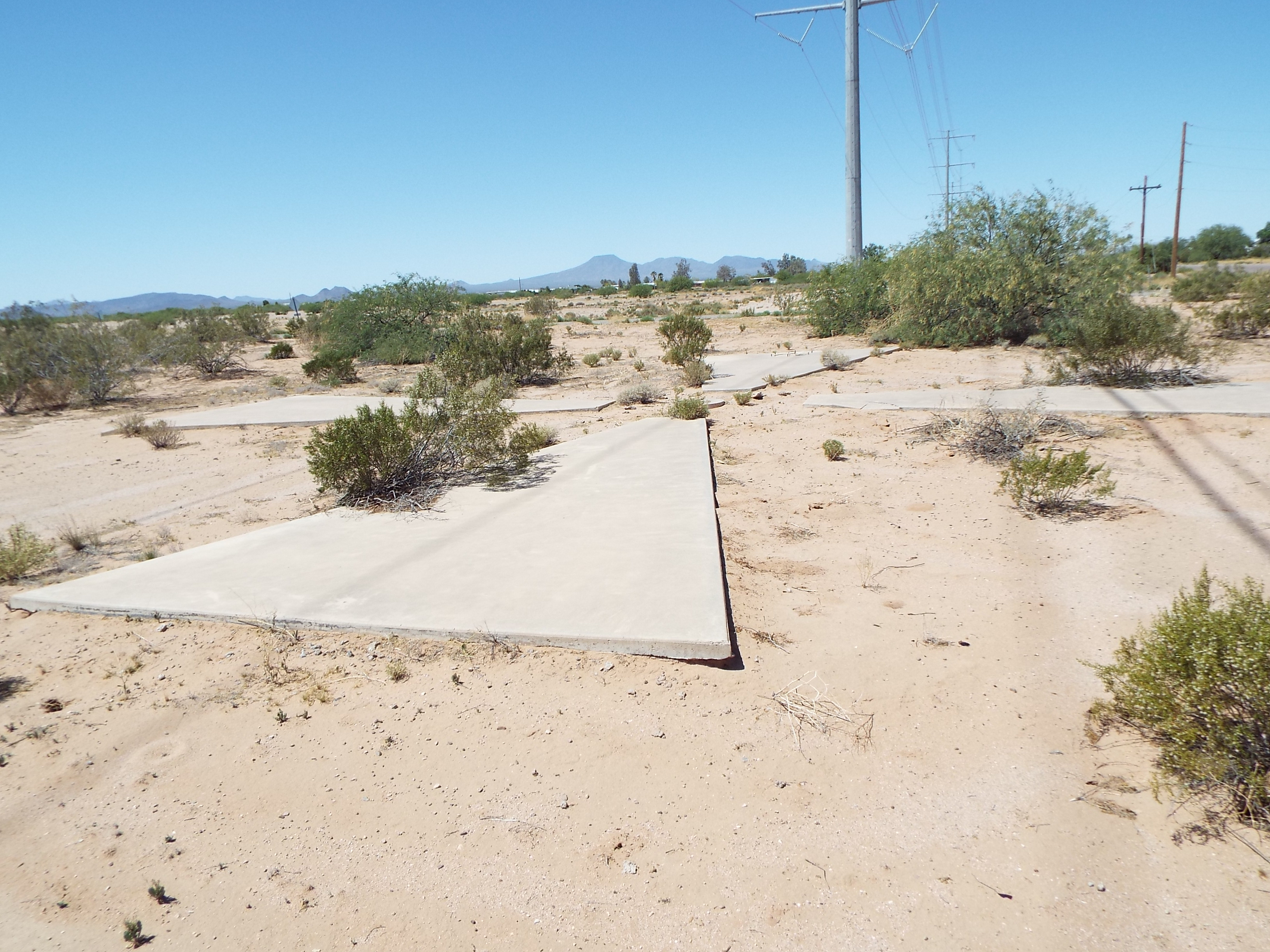
First target (Y4-7) is located on the southeast corner of South Montgomery Road and West Cornman Road.

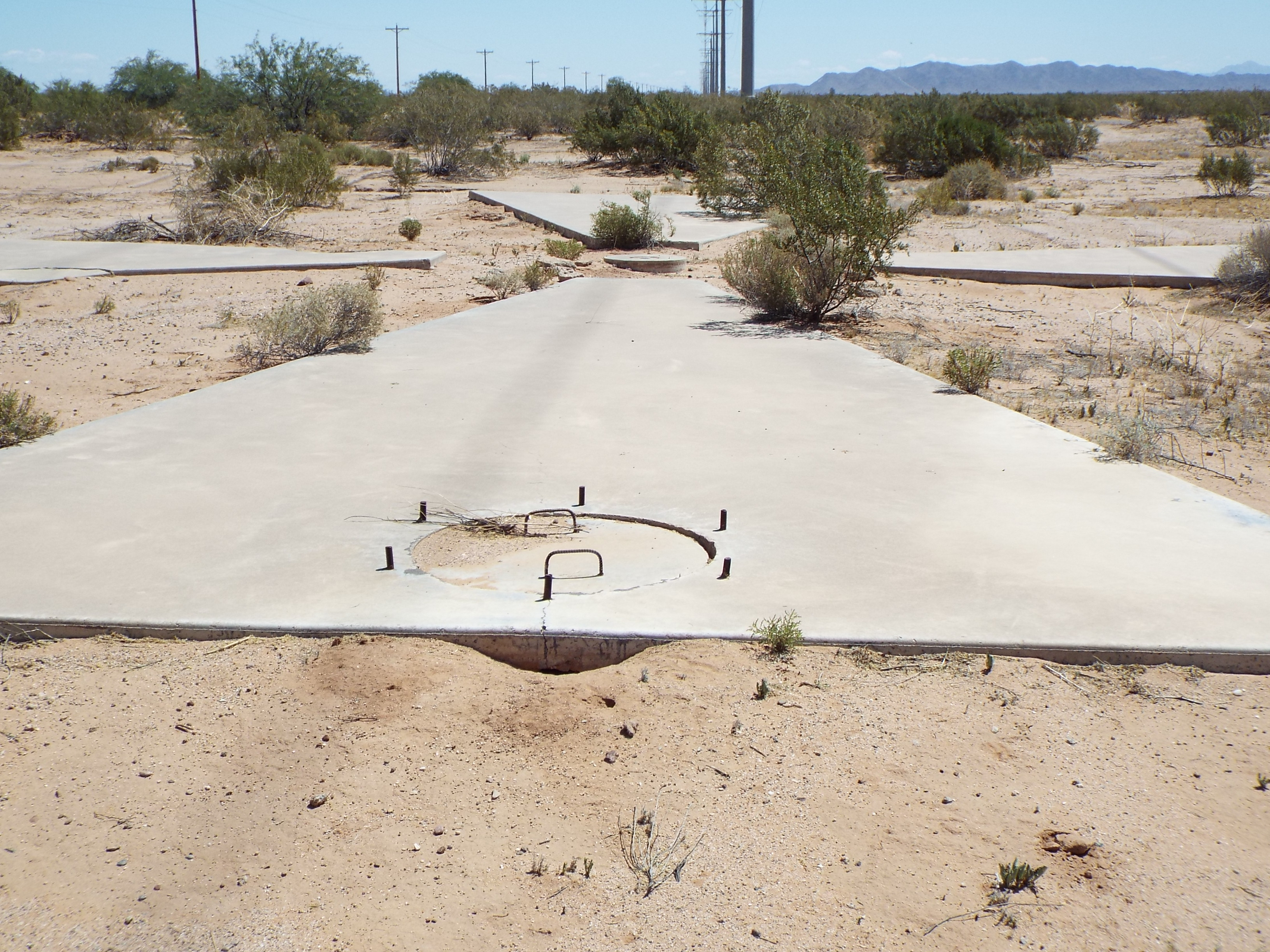
Manhole, with cement cover and rebar handles of the first Corona Satellite Calibration Target.

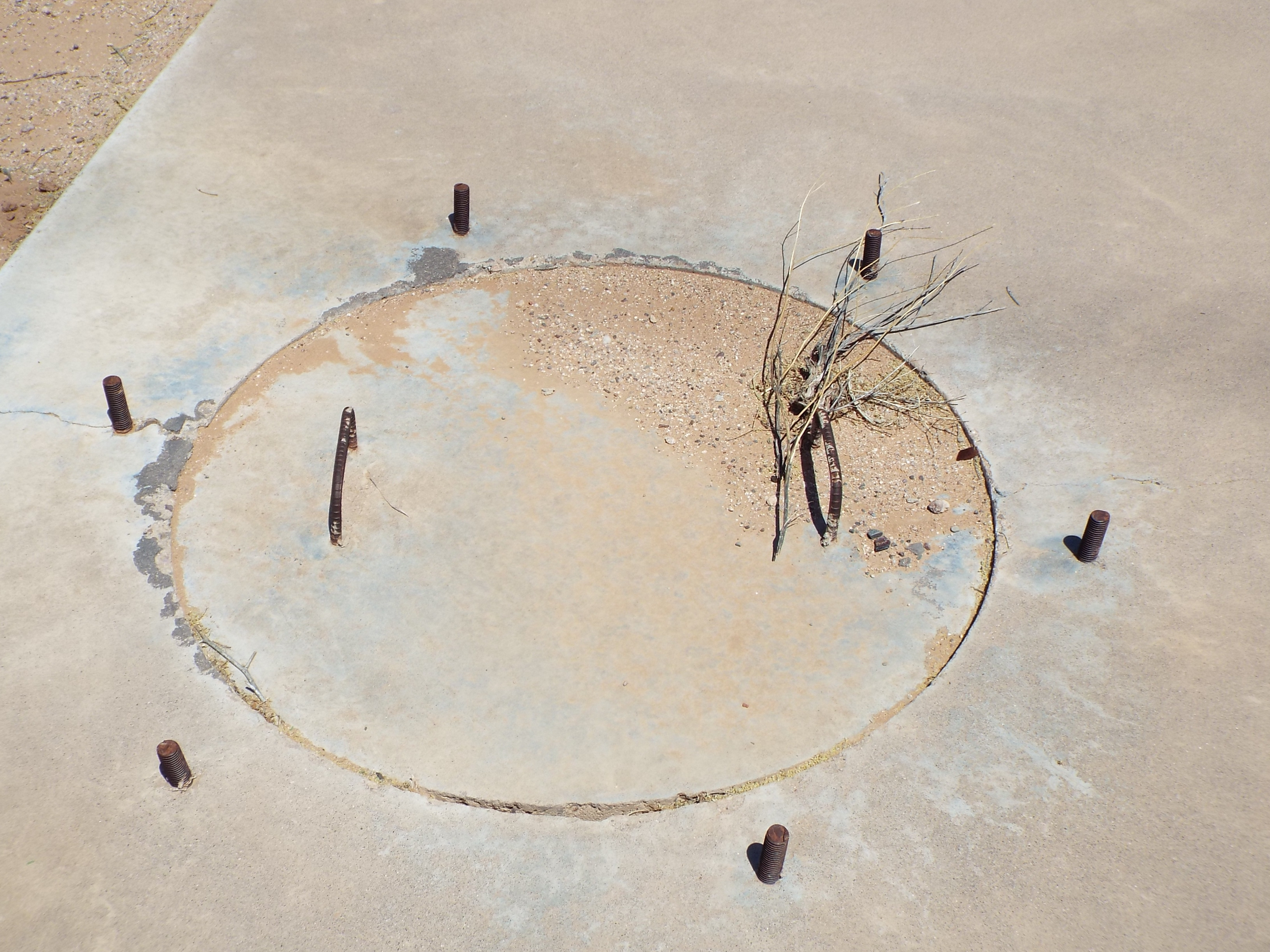
Manhole cover. Around the cover protrudes 6 equal distant pieces of rebar.

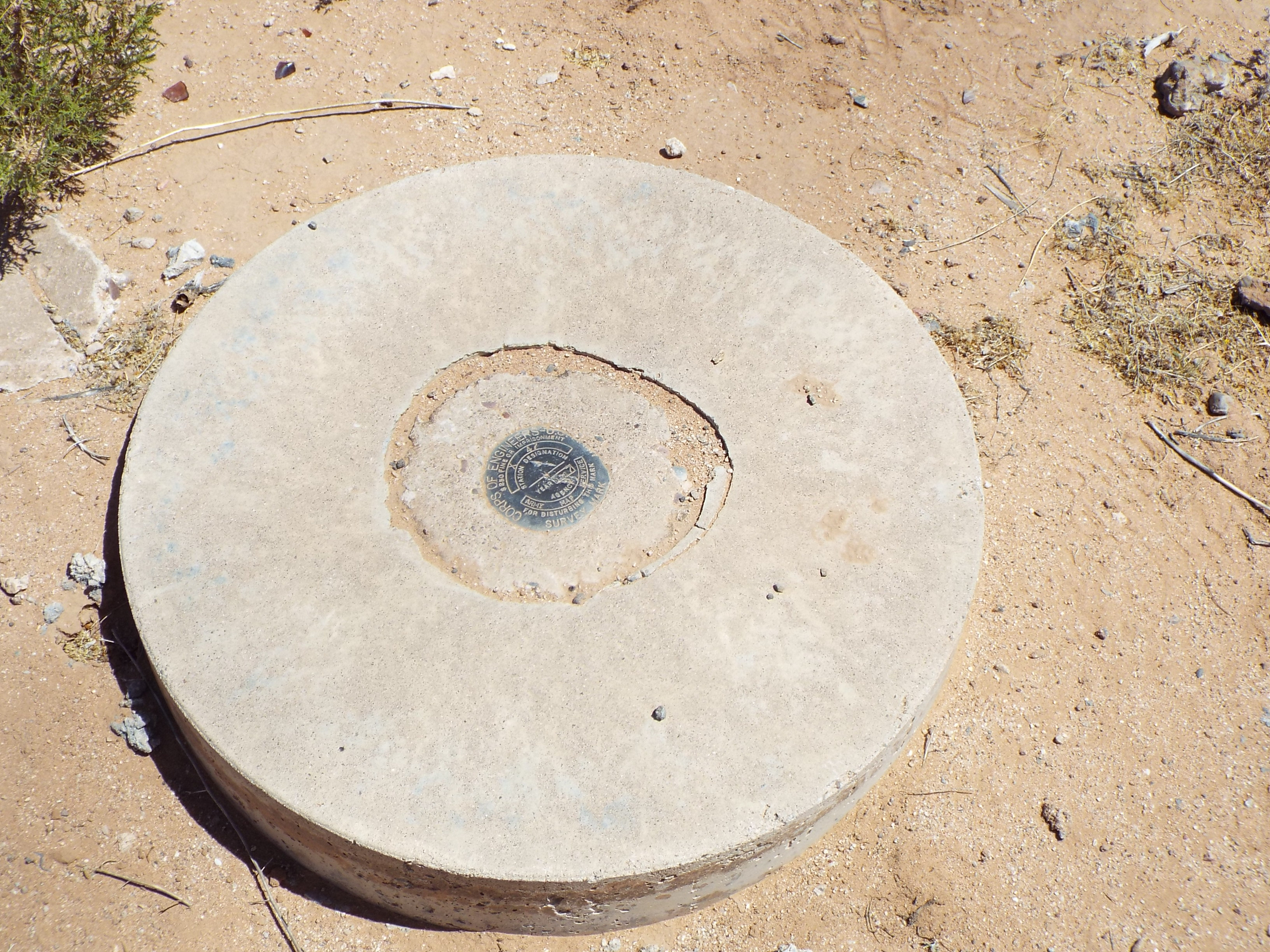
The first Corona Satellite Calibration Target U.S. Corps of Engineers 1967 survey mark.

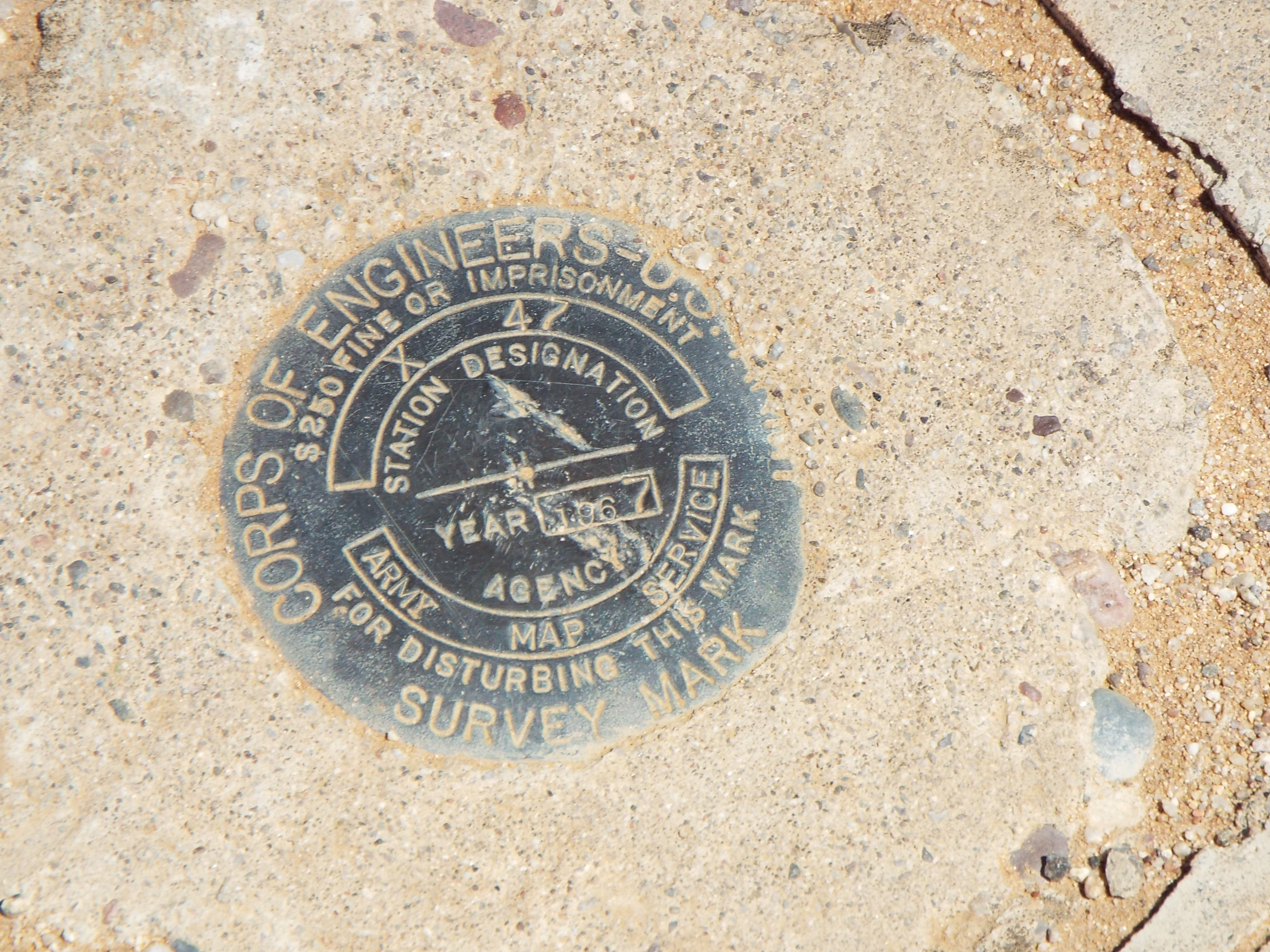
Close-up view of the first Corona Satellite Calibration Target U.S. Corps of Engineers 1967 survey mark.

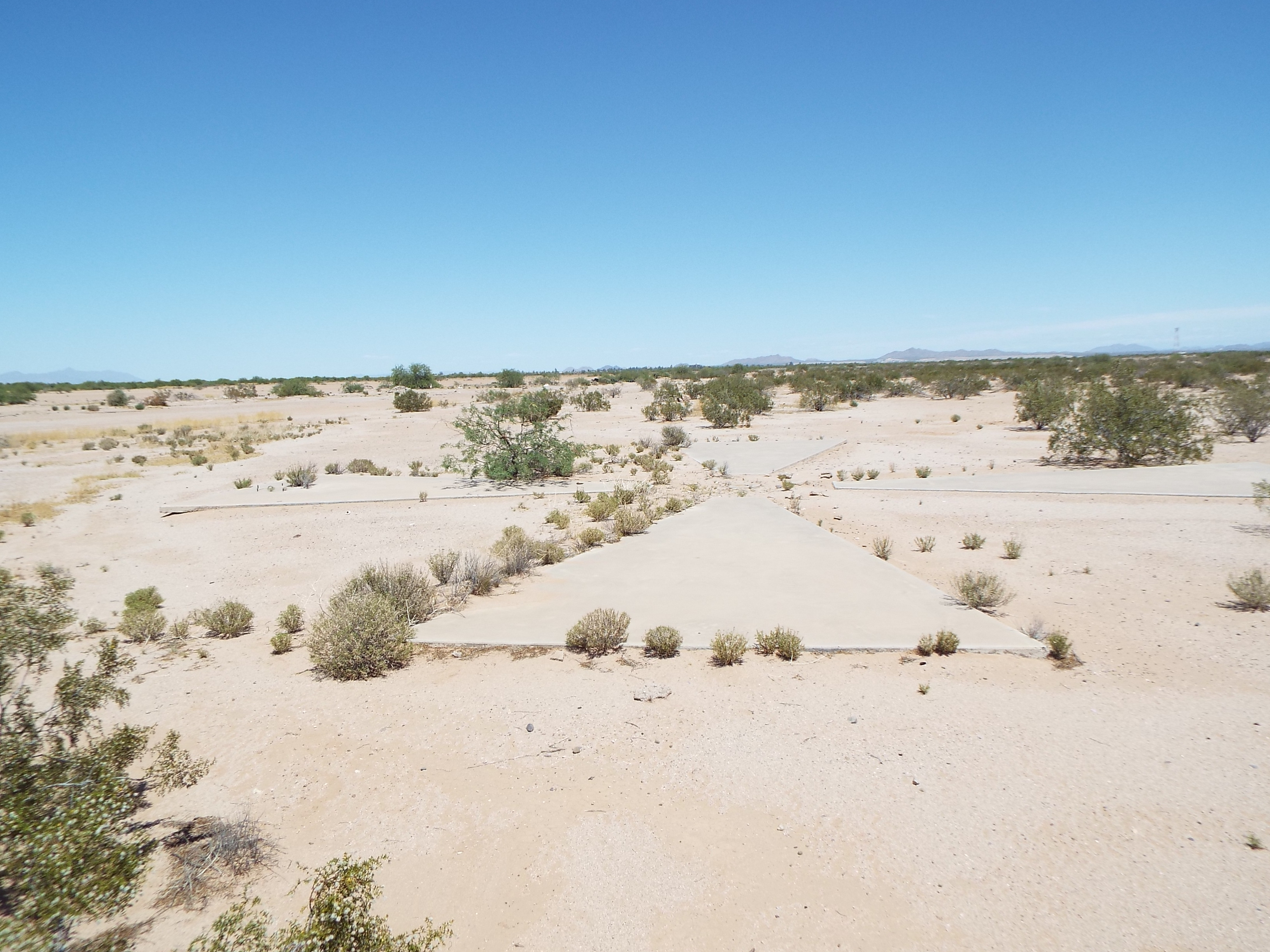
Second Target (Y4-) is located on the northeast corner of West Corman Road and Carmel Blvd.

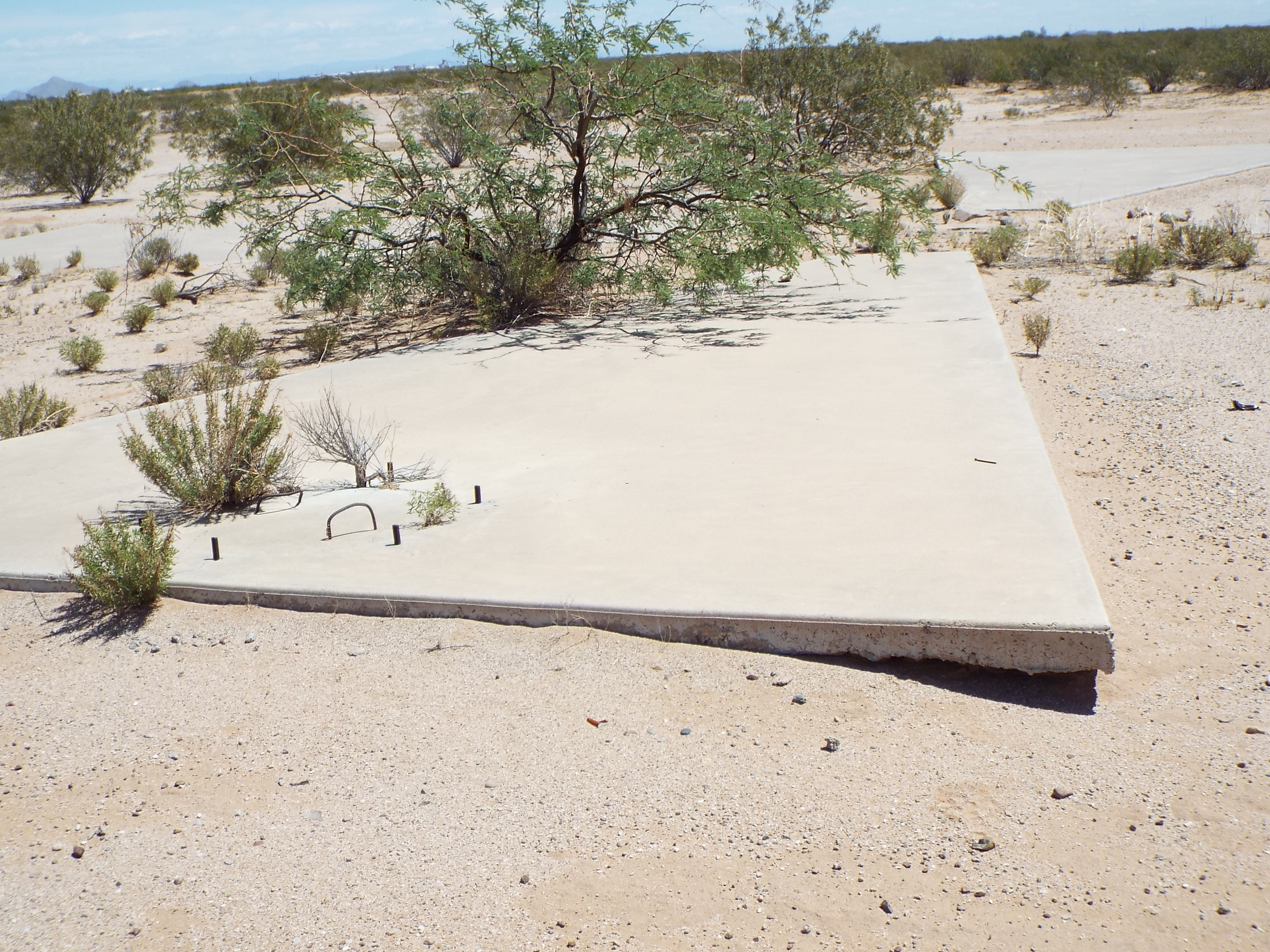
The second Corona Satellite Calibration Target manhole cover.

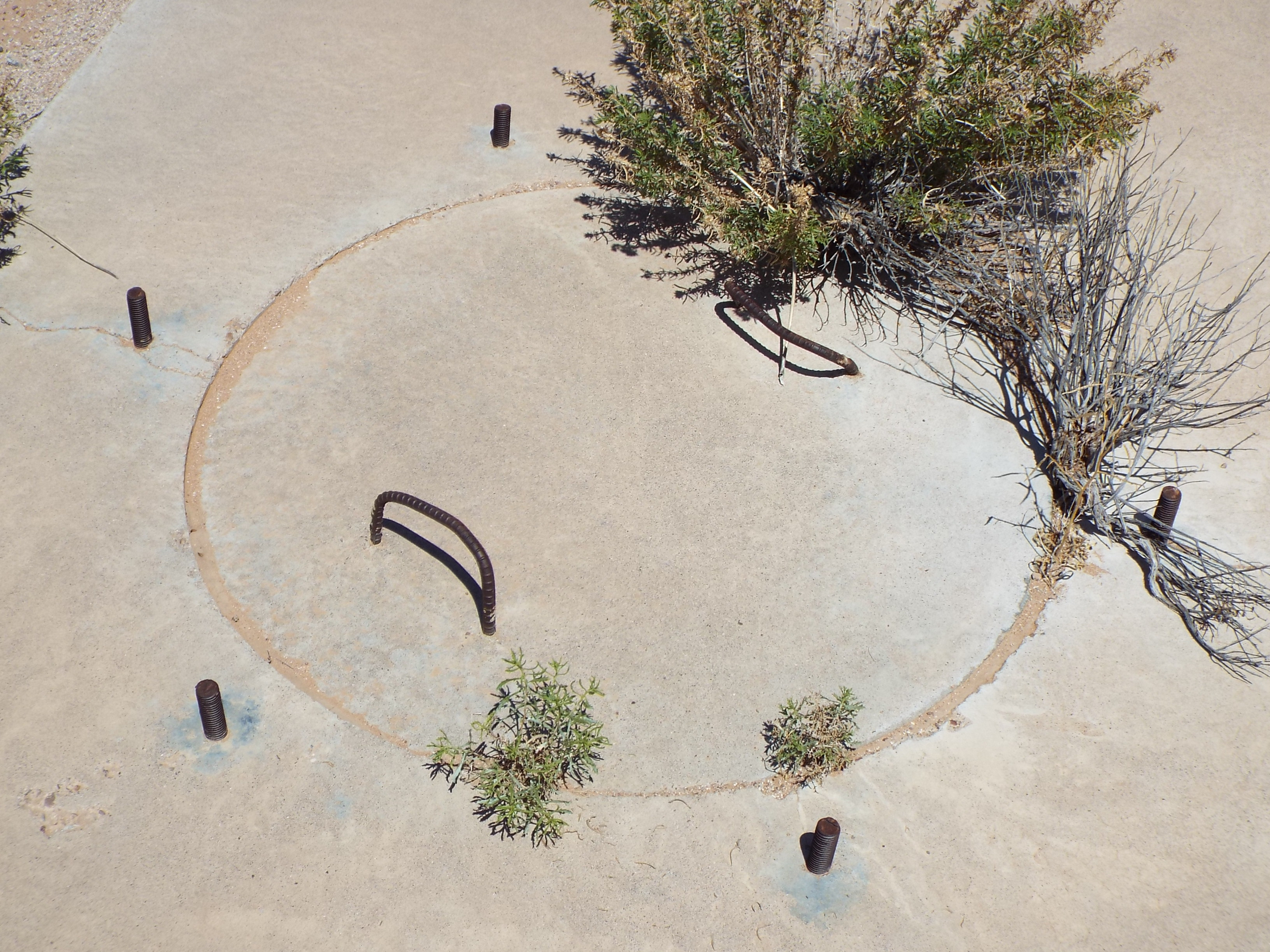
Close-up view of the second Corona Satellite Calibration Target manhole cover.

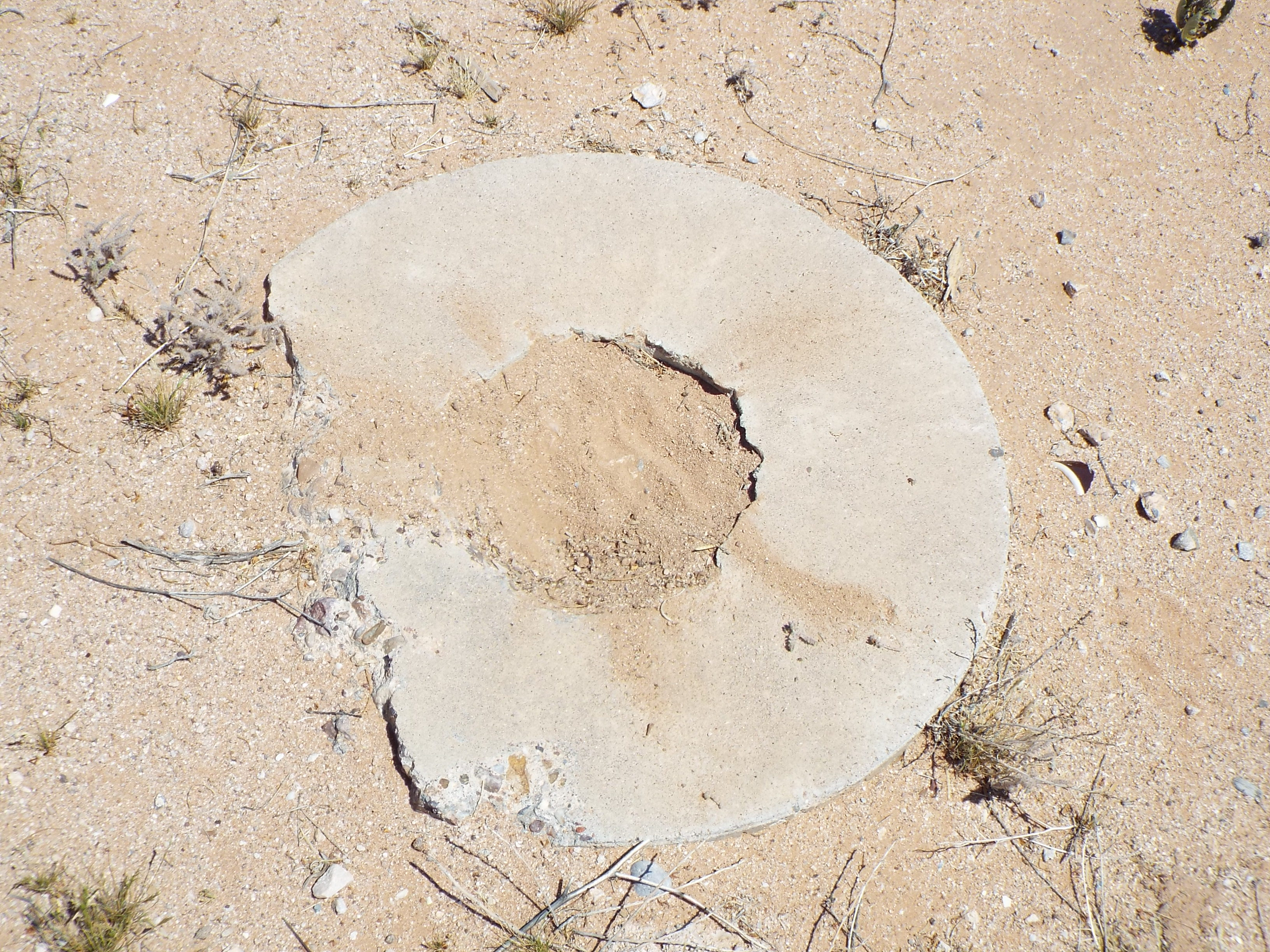
The survey mark of the U.S. Corps of Engineers was once located here.

== The Casa Grande Domes ==
The Casa Grande Domes, located on South Thornton Road, were built in 1982 for the California-based electronics manufacturing company InnerConn Technology Inc's new headquarters. The company's then-current headquarters in Mountain View, California was to become a branch plant. At the ground breaking event for the domes in 1982, owner of InnerConn Technology Patricia Zebb stated:

"I am happy but I am scared. There is still a lot of work to do. I'll be glad when I see the first board come off the plating line."

InnerConn opened one office in the structures, but production never started after it defaulted on a loan and the bank took possession of the property. The domes were abandoned and never completed. In later years, the iconic and crumbling structures, some which resemble flying saucers and giant caterpillars, became an attraction to vandals, graffiti artists and others. The domes were featured in Season 12, Episode 9 of the Travel Channel series "Ghost Adventures" In 2017, the county officials ordered the demolition of the dilapidated domes. On January 9, 2023, demolition of the domes began.

Casa Grande Domes

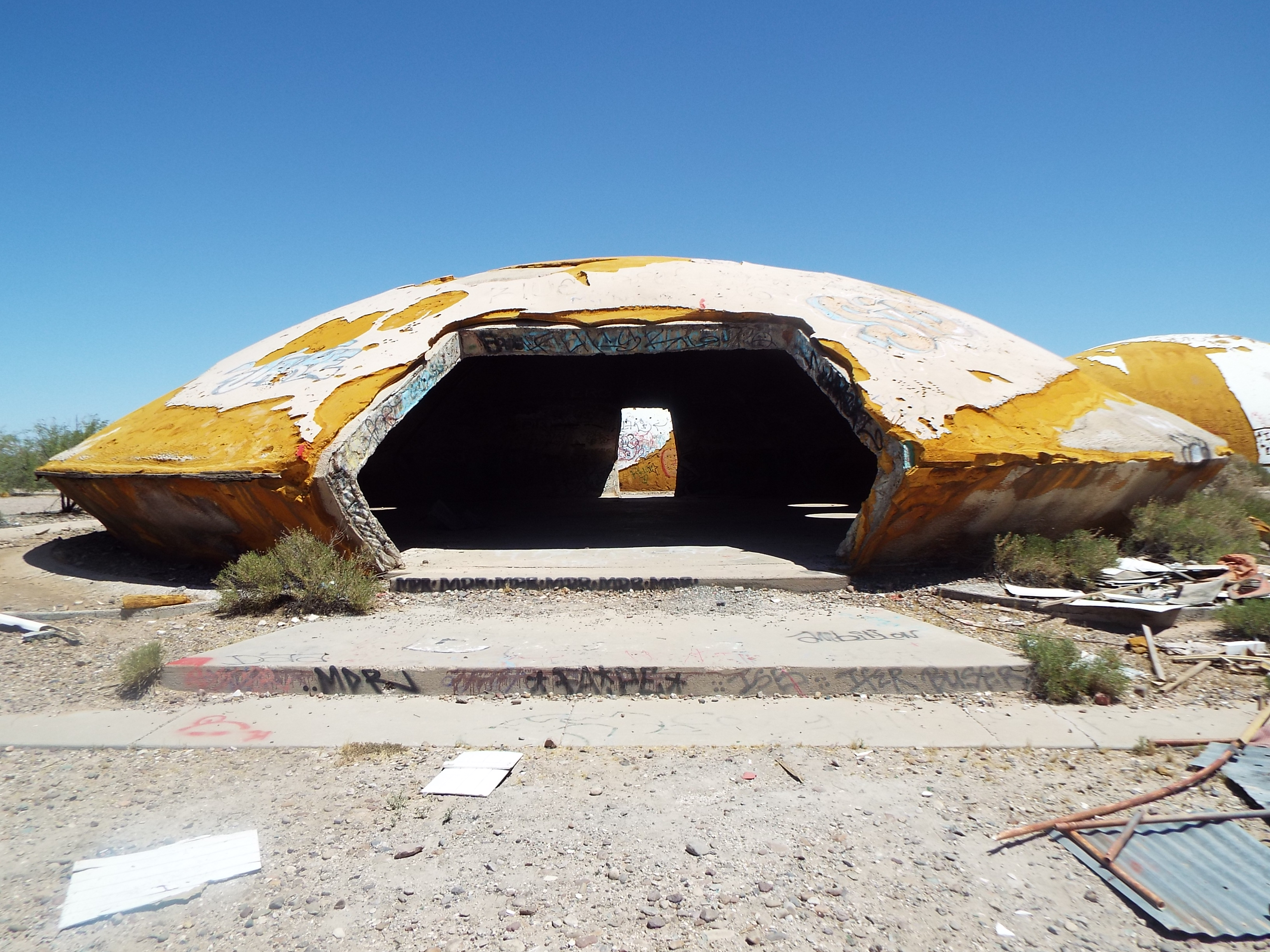
Main Dome

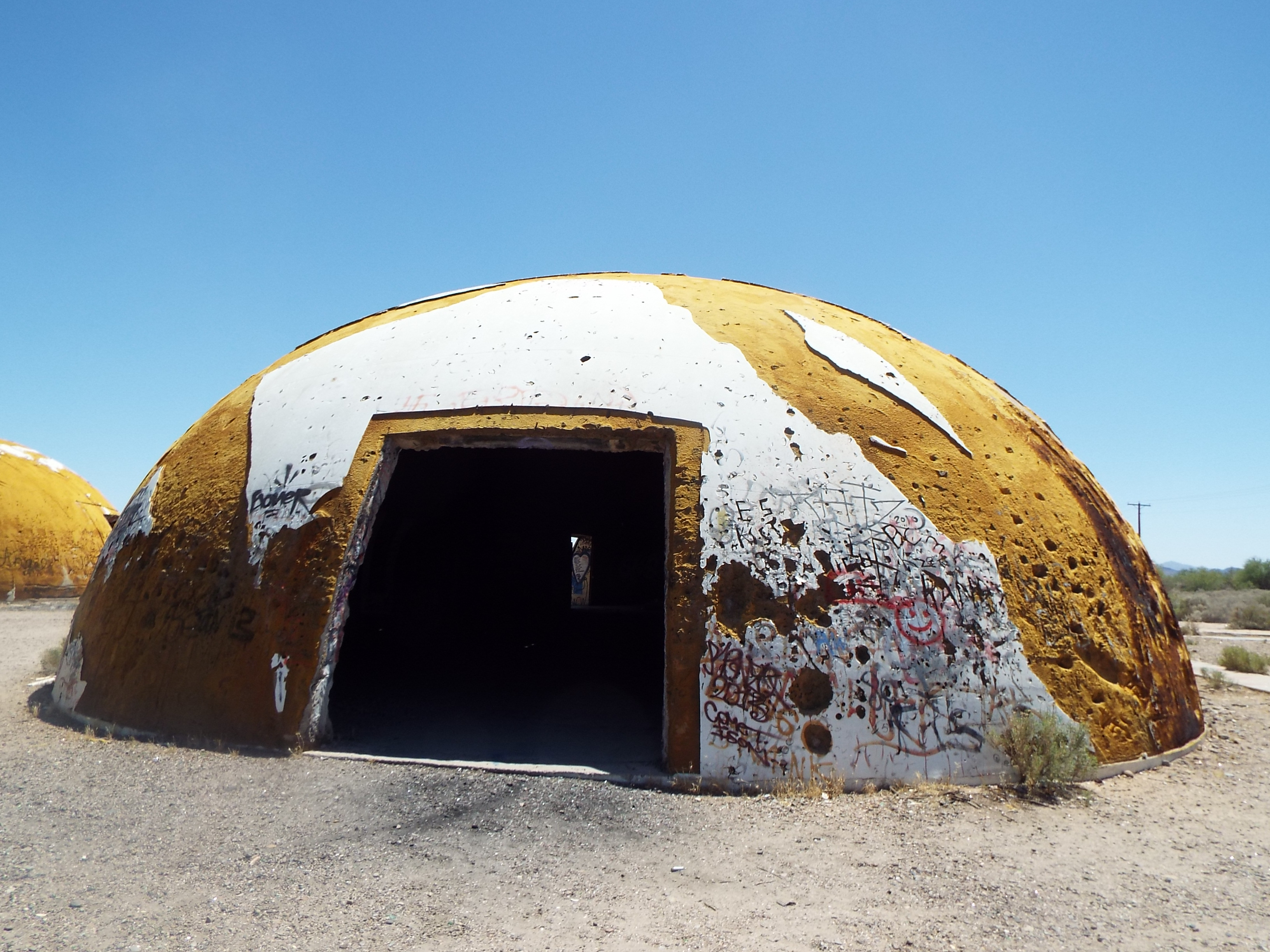
Round dome.

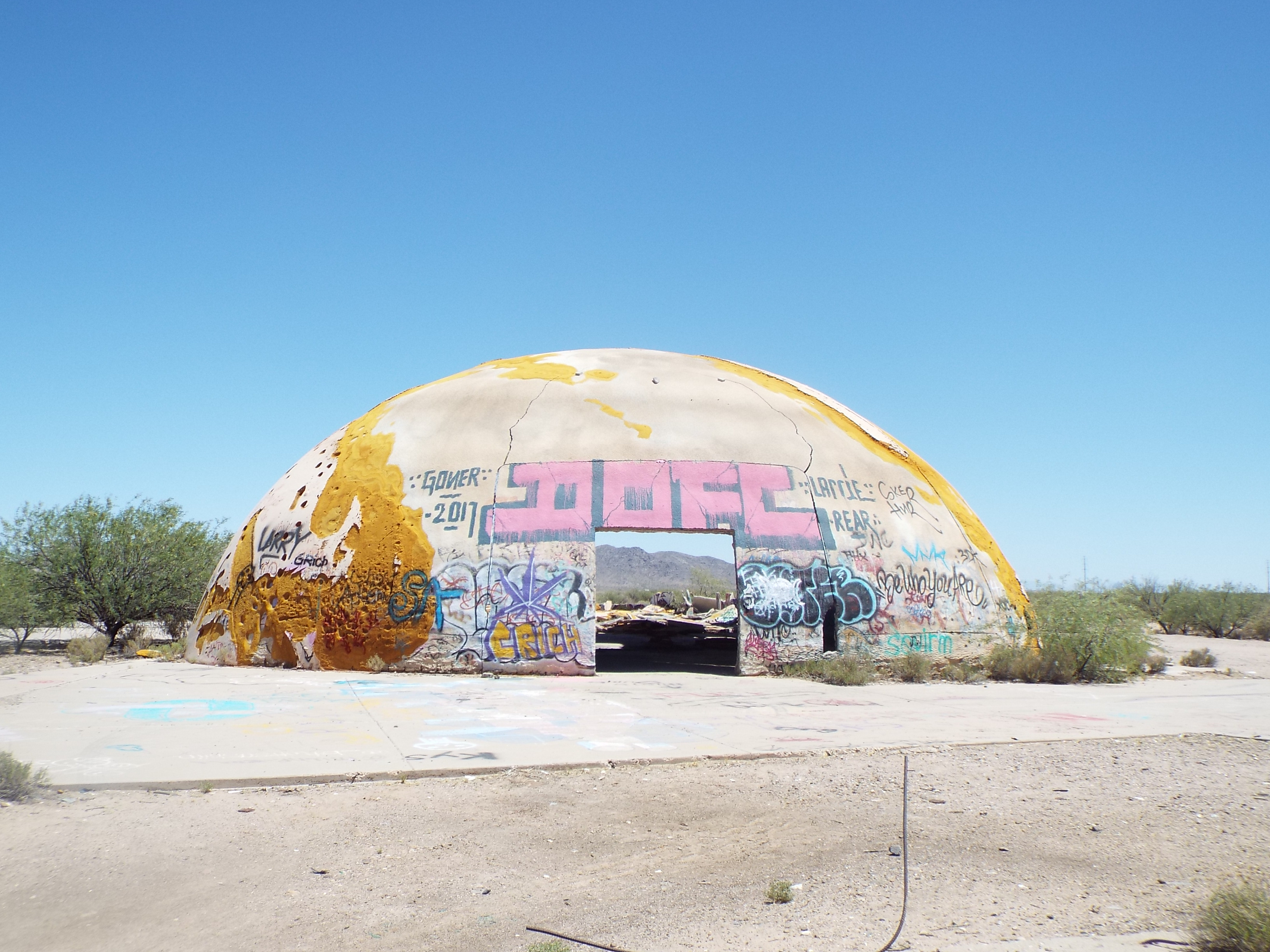
Another round dome.

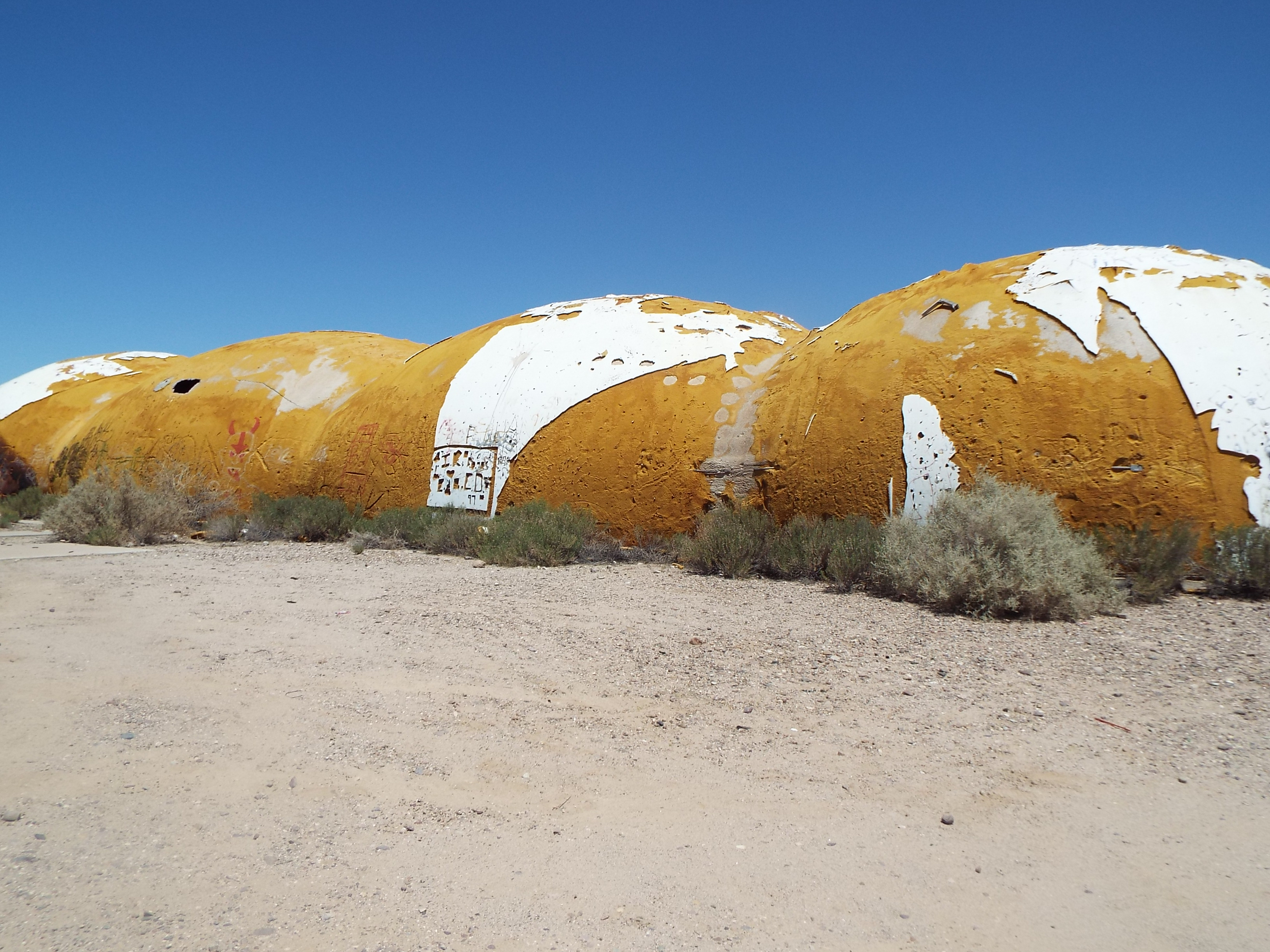
Some domes resembled caterpillars.

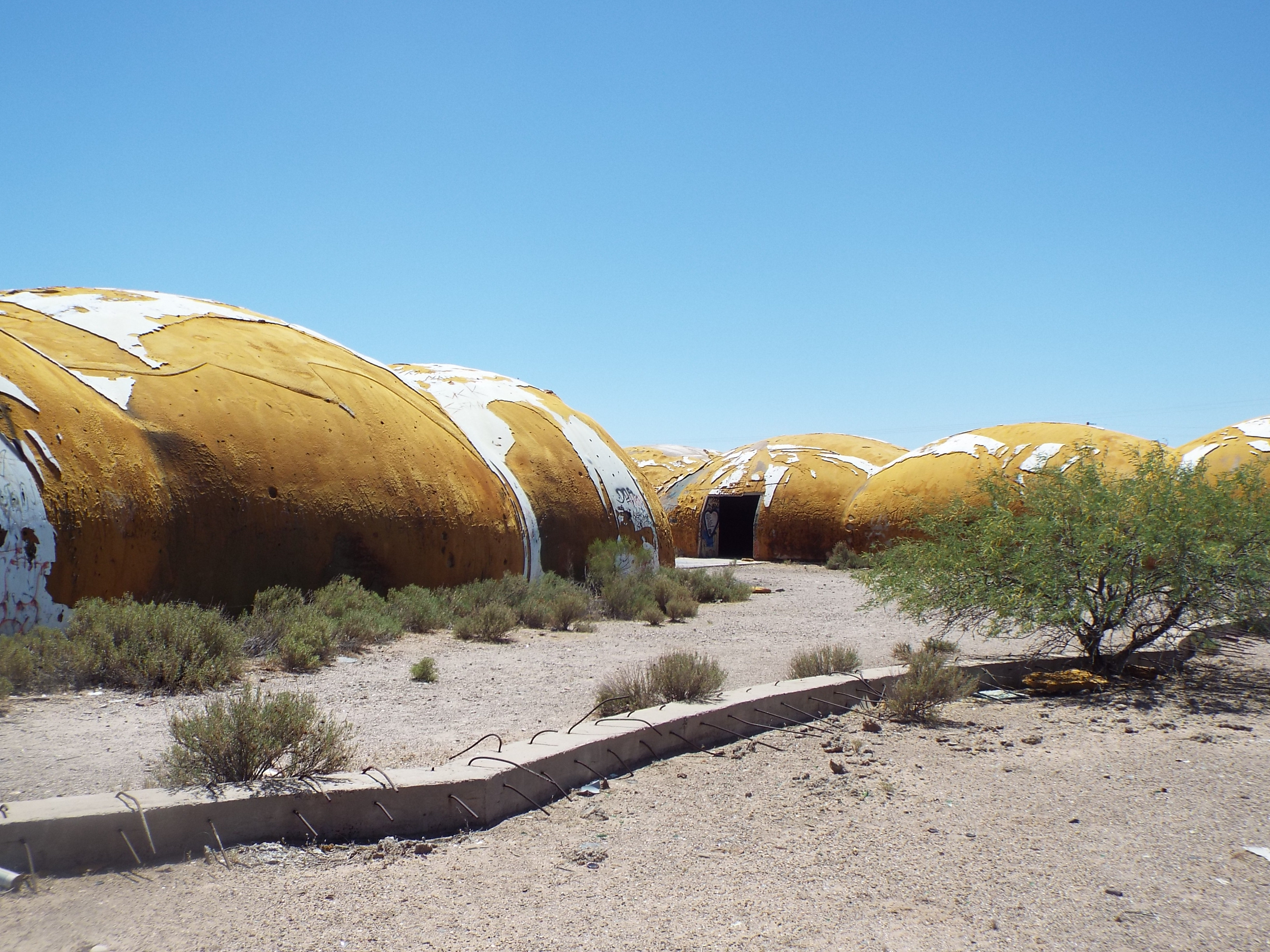
Caterpillar domes.

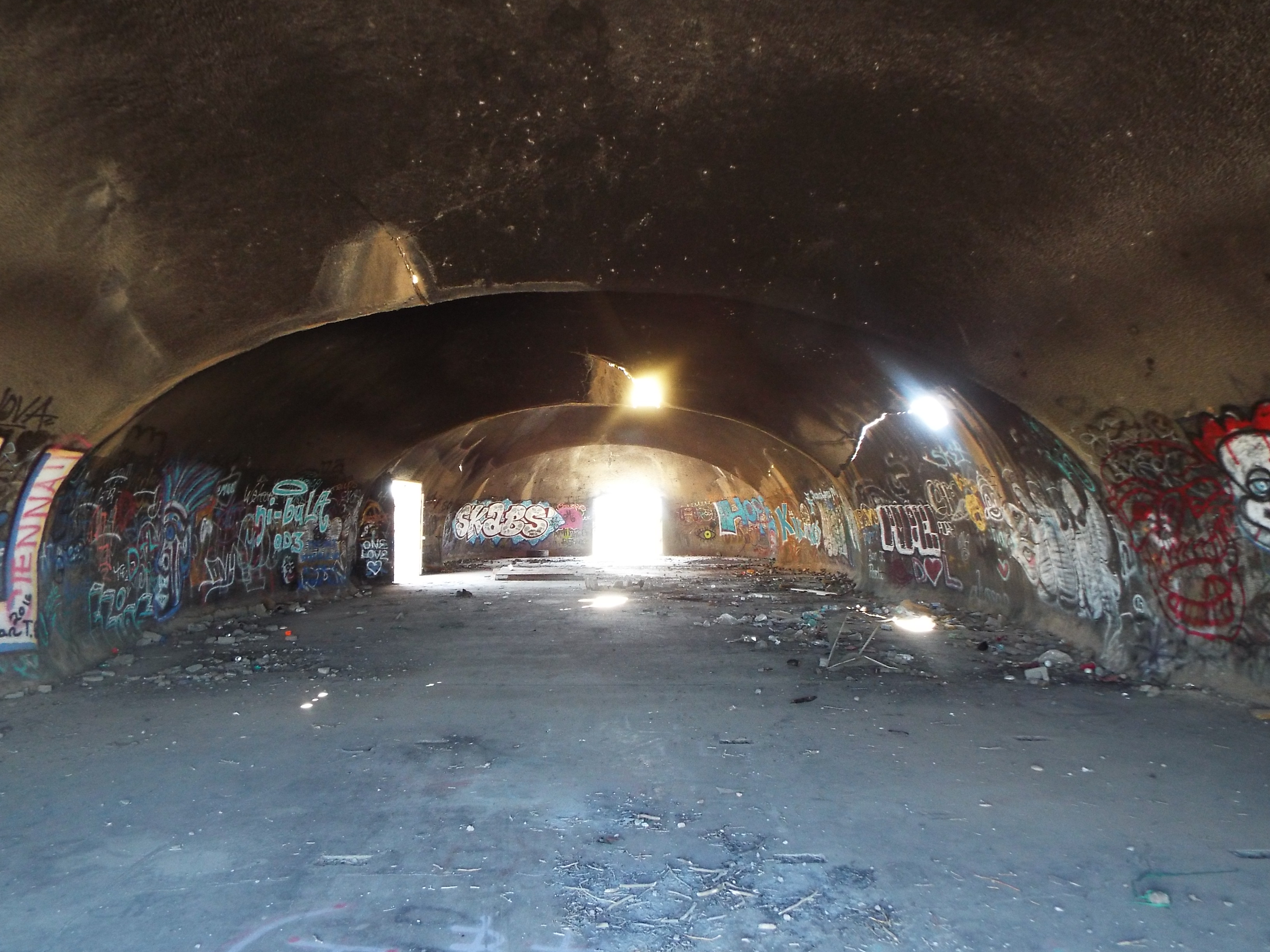
Inside one of the domes.

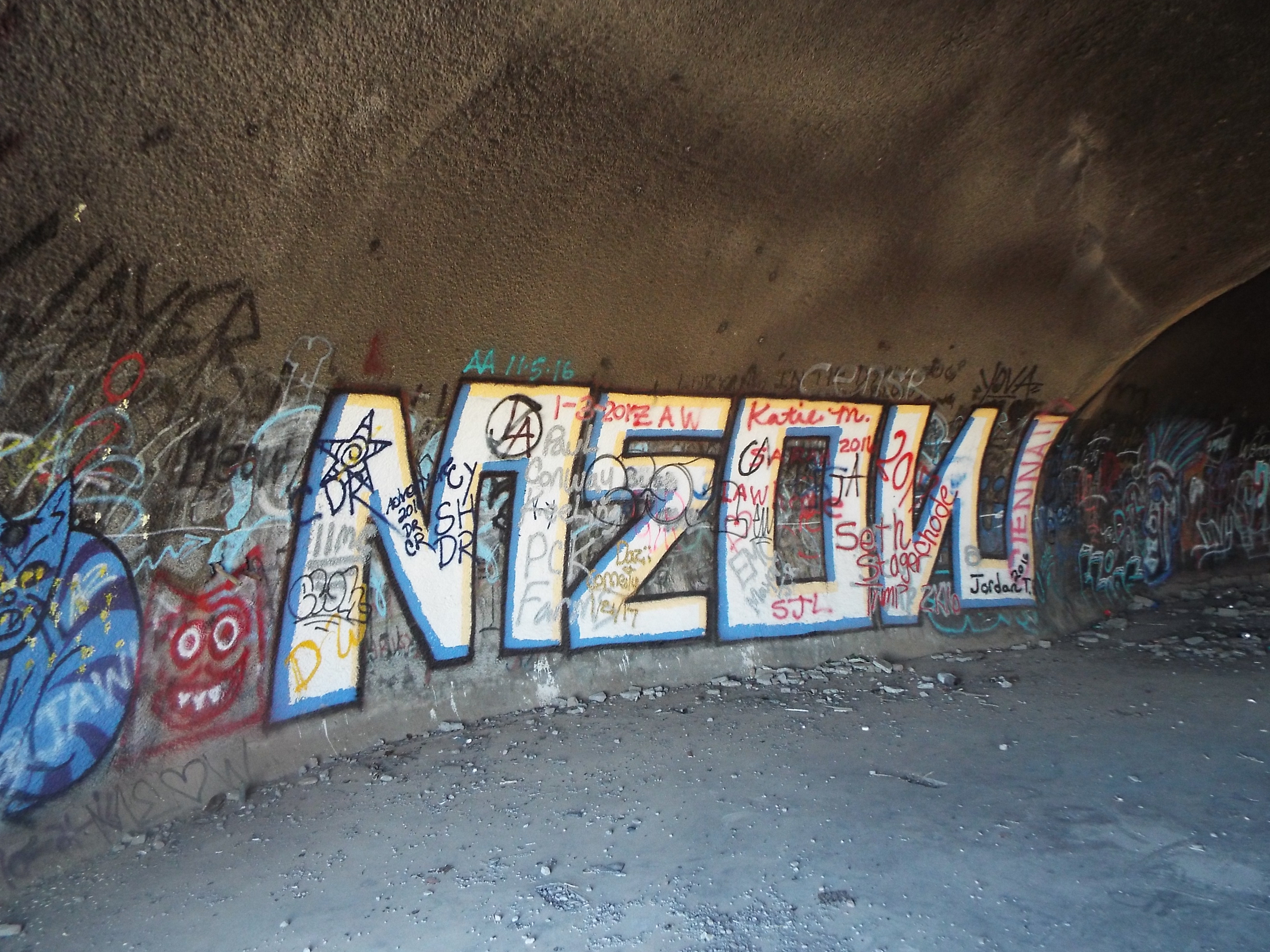
Graffiti inside a dome.

== See also ==
- Casa Grande, Arizona
- Michael Sullivan
- National Register of Historic Places listings in Pinal County, Arizona
