= Matthew B. Juan =

American soldier; first Native American and first Arizonan to die in World War I

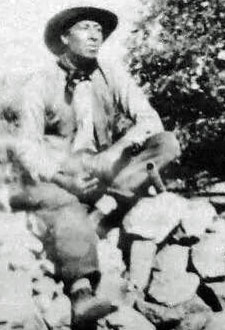
- Matthew B. Juan
- Born: April 22, 1892; San Tan Valley, Arizona
- Died: May 28, 1918 (aged 26) †; Cantigny, France
- Burial place: C.H. Cook Memorial Church Cemetery, Sacaton, Arizona
- Military career
- Allegiance: United States
- Branch: United States Army
- Conflicts: World War I: Battle of Cantigny †

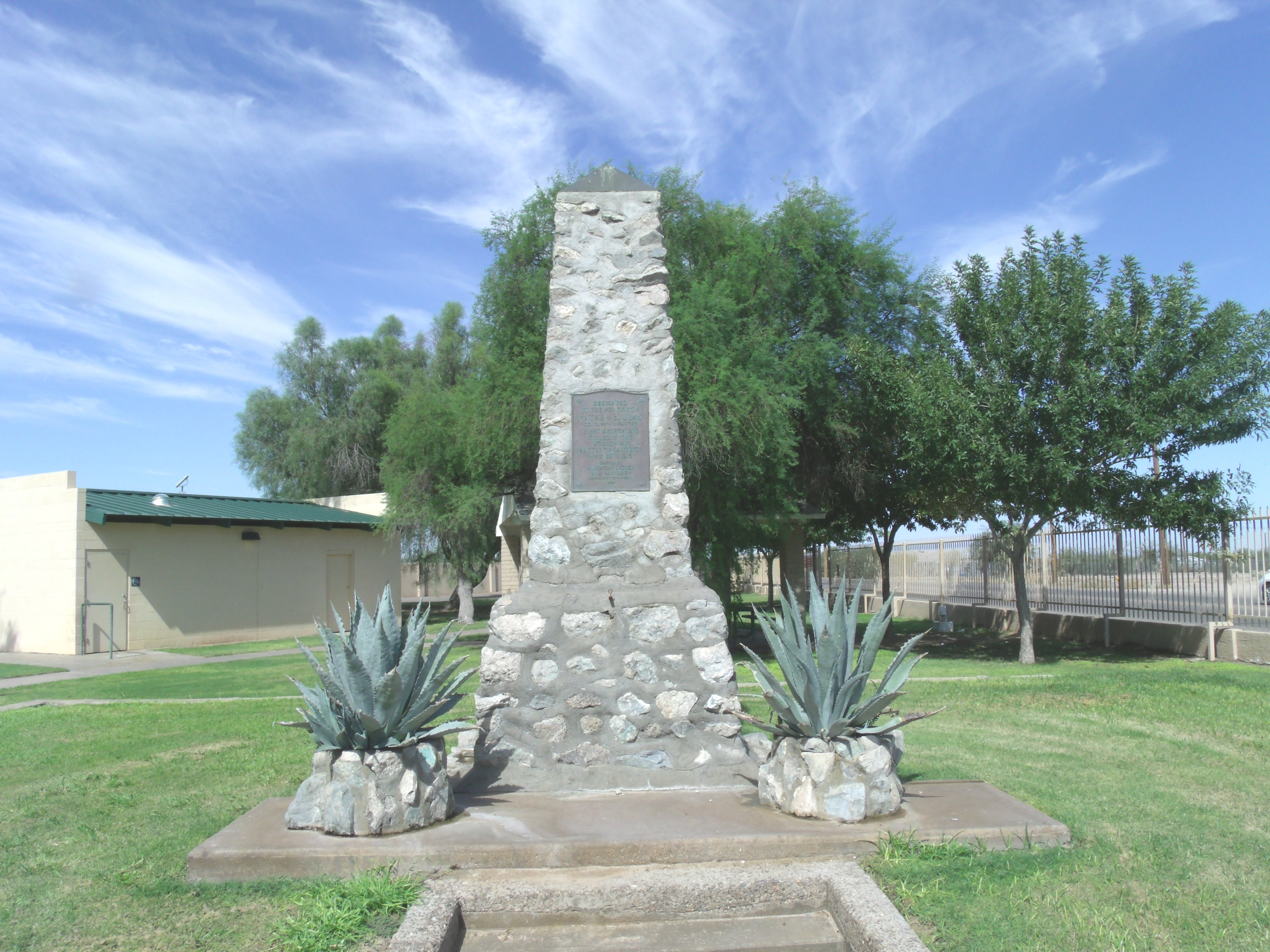
Matthew B. Juan Monument

Matthew Bennett Juan (April 22, 1892 – May 28, 1918), sometimes spelled Mathew, was a Native American hero of World War I who died in the Battle of Cantigny. Juan was the first Arizonan to die in the war.

== Biography ==
Juan (birth name: Matthew Bennett Juan) was part of the Pima people from the Gila River Indian Community. Juan was born in San Tan, Pinal Co., Arizona on April 22, 1892 to Joseph and Mary B. Juan. Matthew grew up in the small agricultural town of Sacaton, Arizona (also the capital of the Gila River Indian Community). He stayed there until he reached high school and left for the Sherman Institute (an Indian boarding school) in Riverside, California. Upon graduation, he joined a travelling circus.

In June 1917 Juan registered his Selective Service Card with the local draft board in Wichita Falls, Texas. Six months later he was drafted. He joined the 6th Co. 1st Infantry Training Regiment on December 11, 1917. He boarded the troopship SS Tuscania in January 1918, bound for Le Havre, France. The Tuscania was torpedoed by a German U-boat February 5, 1918 in the North Channel (U.K.), and 200 American Troops perished along with an additional 65 crew members of the Tuscania. Juan was rescued and taken to Ireland, and eventually made his way to the location of his regiment's encampment.

On May 21, 1918, Juan was transferred to the 1st Division, 2nd Infantry Brigade, 28th Infantry, Company K. At 6:45 am Tuesday May 28, 1918, the 28th Infantry attacked the German-occupied area near Cantigny, France. It was the first American offensive against German-occupied territory in World War I. Juan was killed from enemy machine gun fire while advancing on the German stronghold.

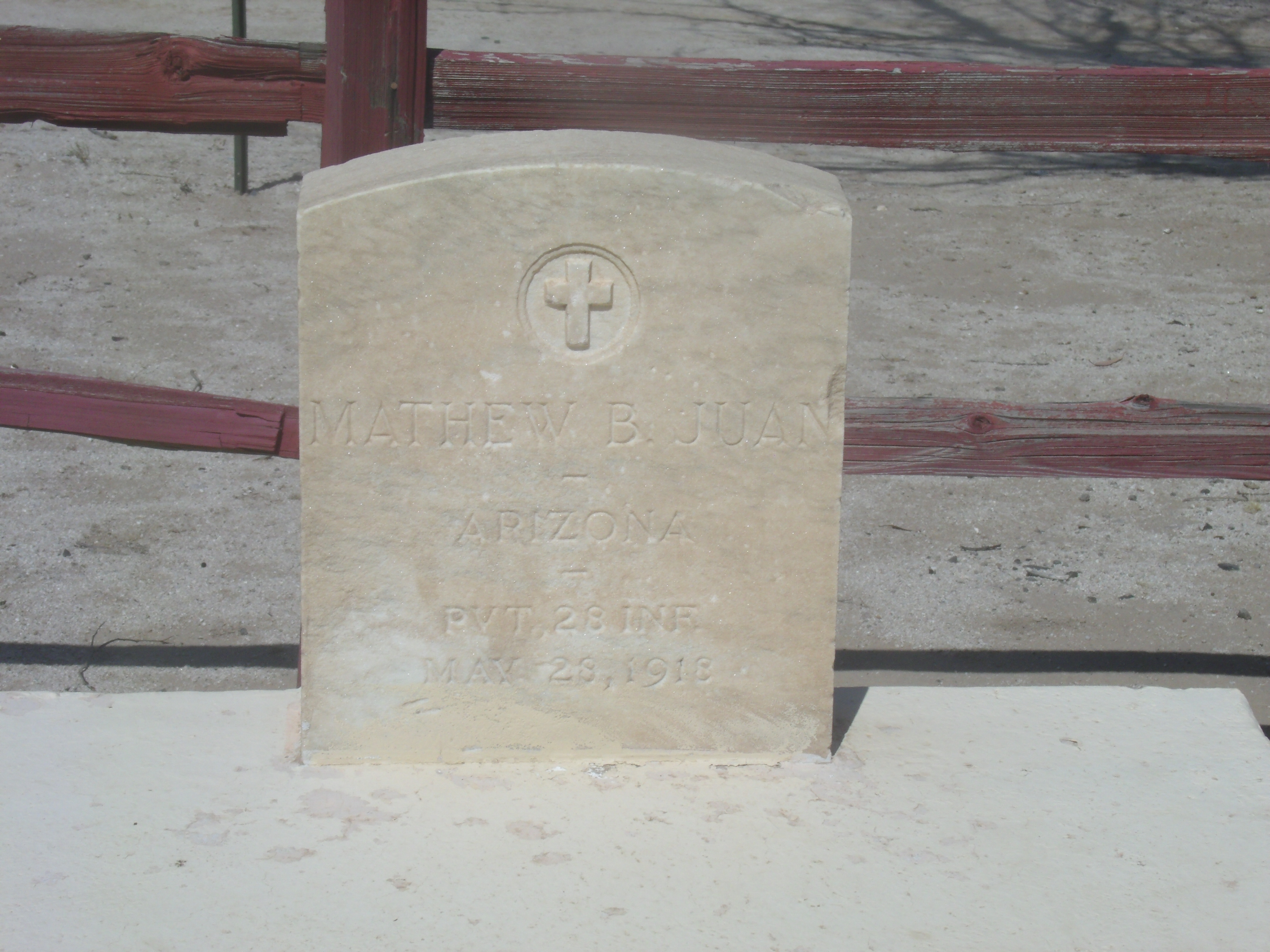
The grave of Matthew B. Juan

His body was temporarily buried in France. In 1921 the U.S. Military exhumed the body and at the request of his mother, returned him home to Arizona. His remains were delivered to the Fisher Funeral Home in Casa Grande, Arizona where preparations were made for the final burial at the C.H. Cook Memorial Church yard in Sacaton, Arizona. He was buried with honors April 9, 1921. Juan was the first Arizonan to be killed in World War I.

== Matthew B. Juan Monument ==
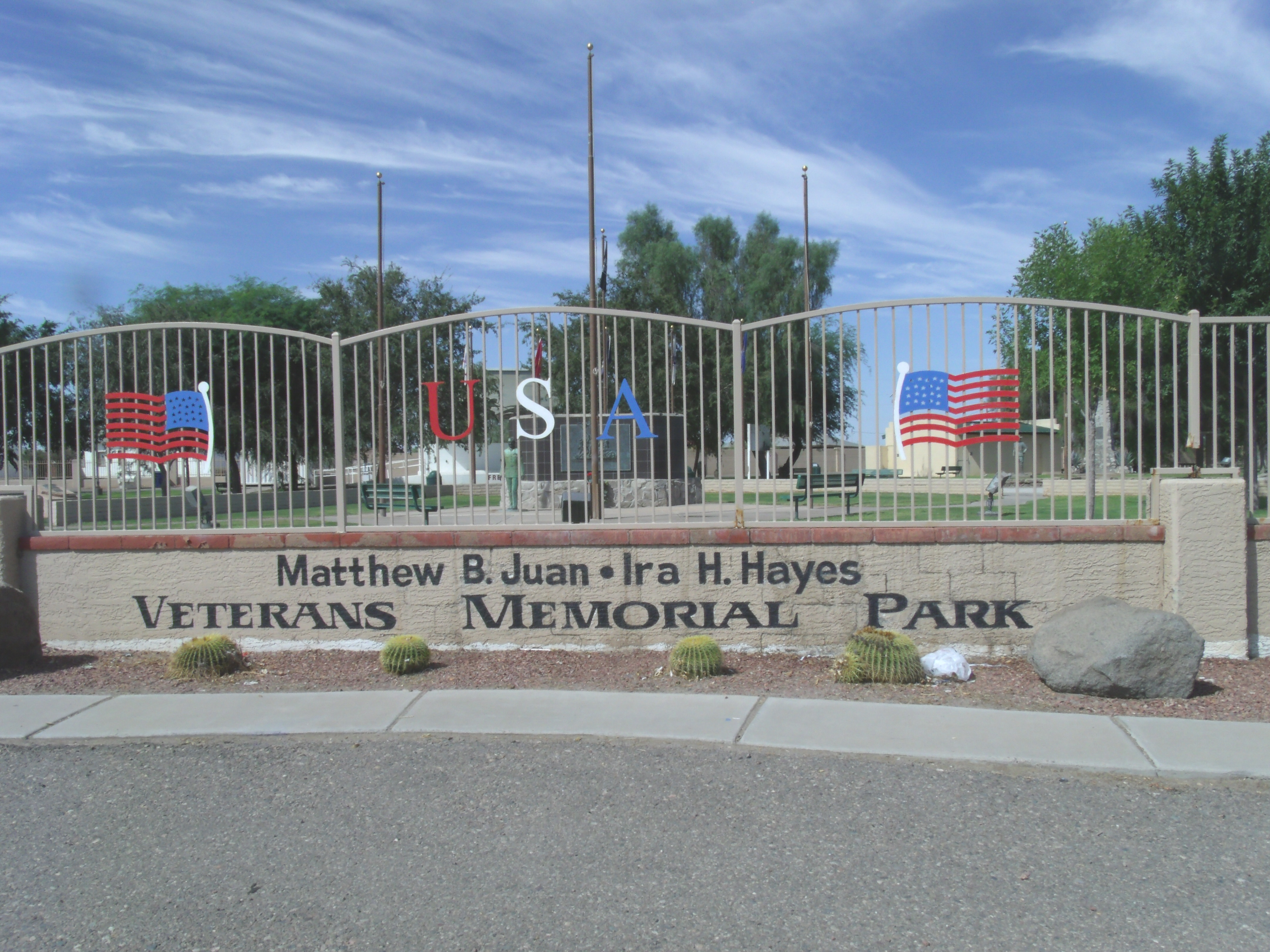
The Matthew B. Juan–Ira H. Hayes Veterans Memorial Park'.

Michael Sullivan, a stonemason from Casa Grande, built a monument dedicated to Juan in the town of Sacaton. The monument, which is located in the Matthew B. Juan–Ira Hayes Veterans Memorial Park of Sacaton, is made of fieldstones.

== See also ==
- Ira H. Hayes
