= Michael Sullivan (stonemason) =

American stonemason (d.1928)

- Born: Casa Grande, Arizona
- Died: March 25, 1928; Sacaton, Arizona
- Occupation: Stonemason

Michael Sullivan (died March 25, 1928) was a stonemason who in the 1920s built various historical structures of fieldstone in Casa Grande. He also built a monument in the town of Sacaton, Arizona, dedicated to Pvt. Matthew B. Juan, a Native American, who was the first Arizonan to die in World War I.

== Stonemason ==
Sullivan was born in Casa Grande, Arizona, in the late 19th century. There he became a professional stonemason. His specialty was building structures out of fieldstones. Fieldstones are the stones collected from the surface of fields where it occurs naturally. The stones used as fieldstones are building construction materials which are collected from the surface of fields where they occur naturally. In 1924, he built the cobble Casa Grande Woman's Club Building, following the design of Tucson architect Henry Jaastad.

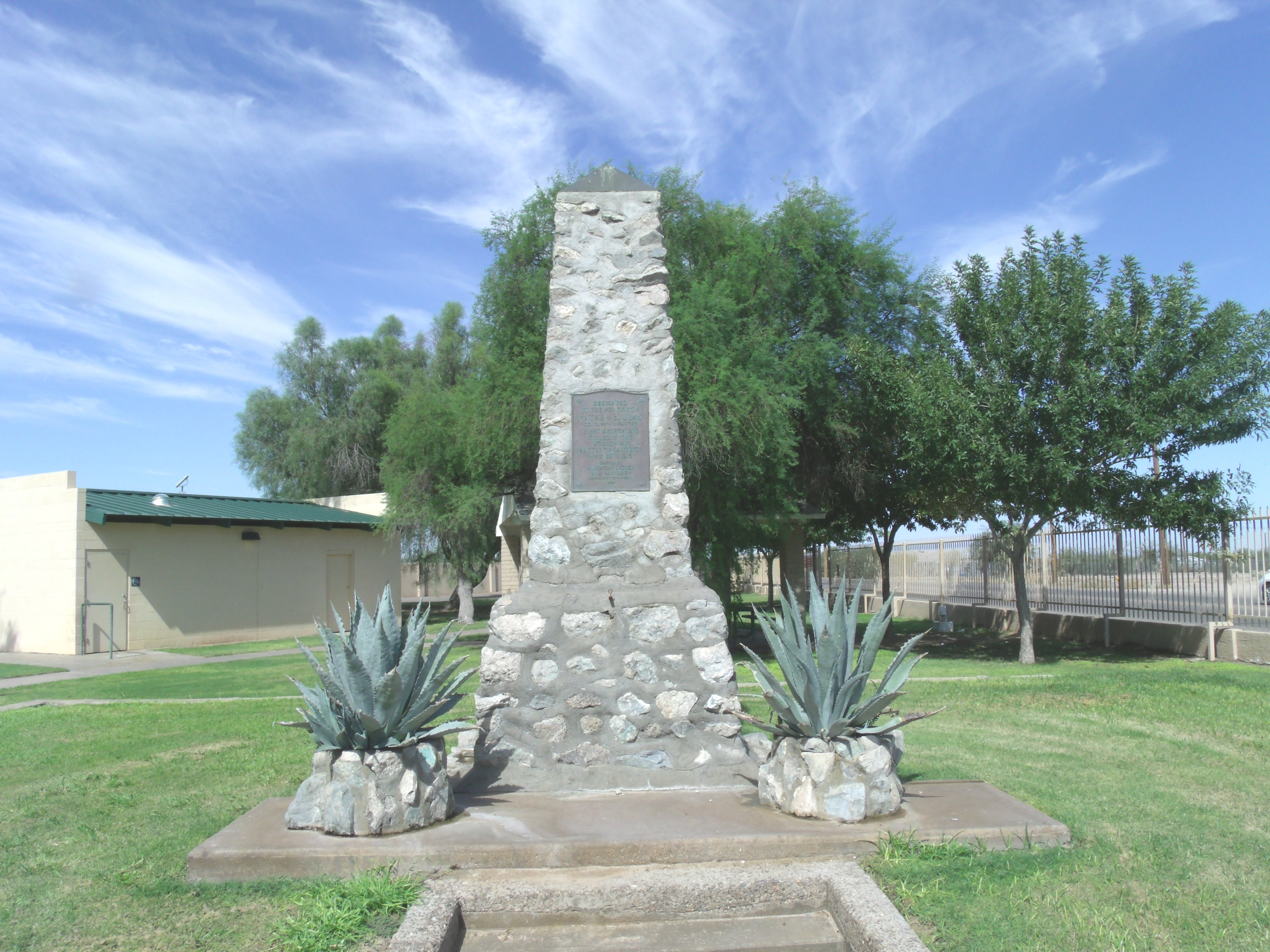
The Pvt. Matthew B. Juan monument in the town of Sacaton, Arizona.

The largest fieldstone building to be built by Sullivan was a building for the local Presbyterian congregation which is known as “The Casa Grande Stone Church”. He accomplished this feat with the help of Los Angeles architect Robert Orr. The first service held in the church, with its glittering copper-plated dome, was in January 1928. The Casa Grande Historical Society acquired the Stone Church in June 1977.

Sullivan's last completed project was the Pvt. Matthew B. Juan monument in the town of Sacaton, Arizona. Juan (April 22, 1892 – May 28, 1918) was a Native American who died in the Battle of Cantigny of World War I. Juan was the first Arizonan to die in the war. Sullivan did not see the dedication of this monument as he died on March 25, 1928, of a heart attack while en route to Sacaton, Arizona, for a visit.

== List of historic fieldstone structures ==
Among the structures which he built and which are listed in the National Register of Historic Places are the following:

- The House at 222 9th St., built in 1920 and located at the same address. It was listed in the National Register of Historic Places in 2002, reference #0200073.
- The House at 320 West Eighth Street a.k.a. the Stone Barber Shop, was built in 1920 and is located at 320 W. 8th St. It was listed in the National Register of Historic Places in 2002, reference #02000745.
- The Stone Bungalow was built in 1921 and is located at 515 E. 3rd St. It was listed in the National Register of Historic Places in 1985, reference #85000995.
- The Stone Warehouse was built in 1922 and is located in the rear of the building at 119 Florence St. It was listed in the National Register of Historic Places in 1985, reference #85000896.
- The Casa Grande Woman's Club Building, built in 1924 and located at 407 N. Sacaton St. It was listed in the National Register of Historic Places in 1979, reference #79000425.
- The Casa Grande Stone Church, built in 1927 and located at 110 W. Florence Boulevard. It was listed in the National Register of Historic Places in 1978, reference #78000567.
- The Fisher Memorial Home, built in 1927 and located at 300 E. 8th St. It was listed in the National Register of Historic Places in 1985, reference #85000884.
- The Vasquez House, was built in 1927 and located at 114 E. Florence Boulevard. It was listed in the National Register of Historic Places in 1985, reference #85000897.

== Gallery of Sullivan’s historic fieldstone structures ==
Historic structures of fieldstone built by Michael Sullivan
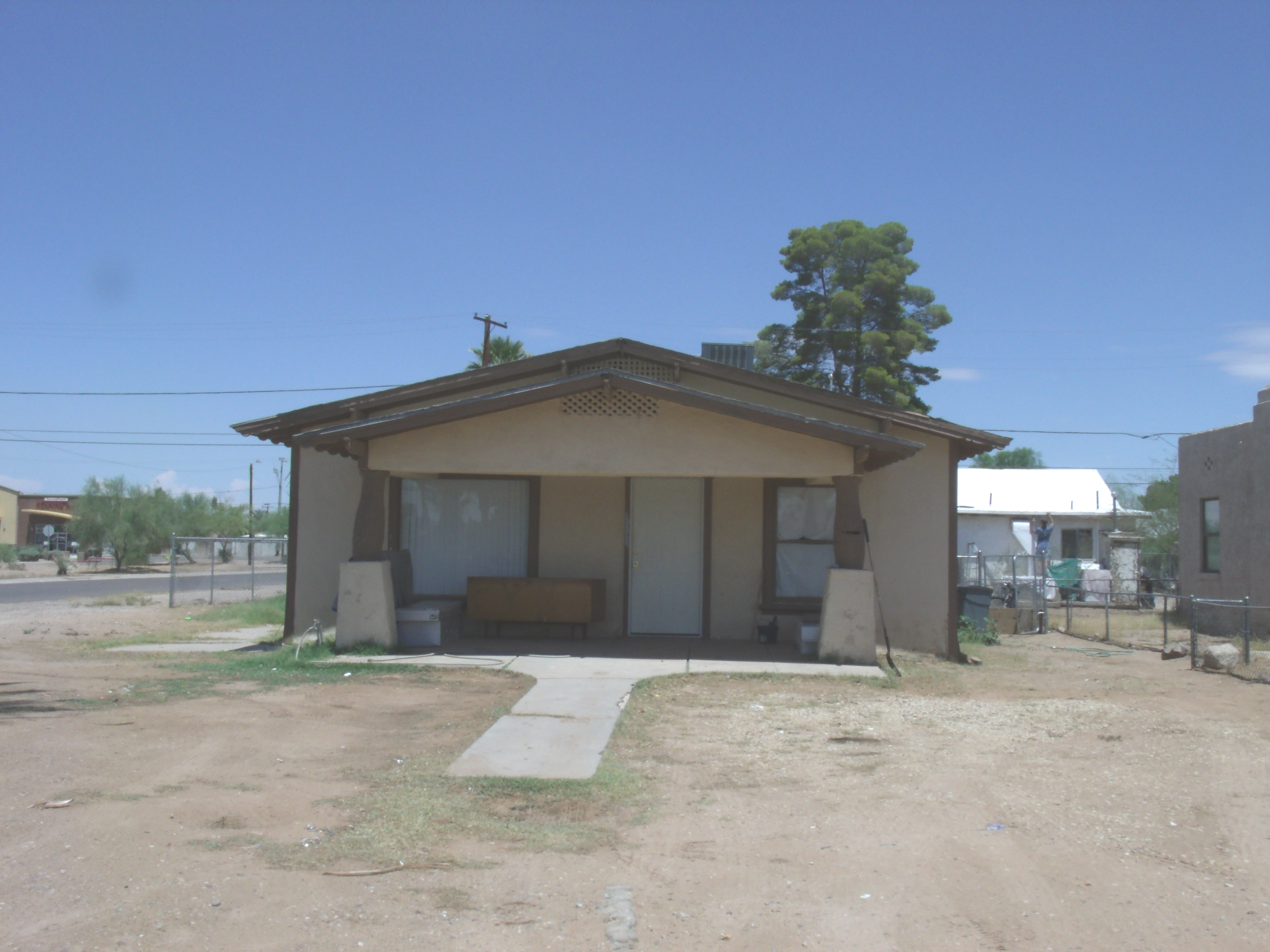
The House at 222 West Ninth St.

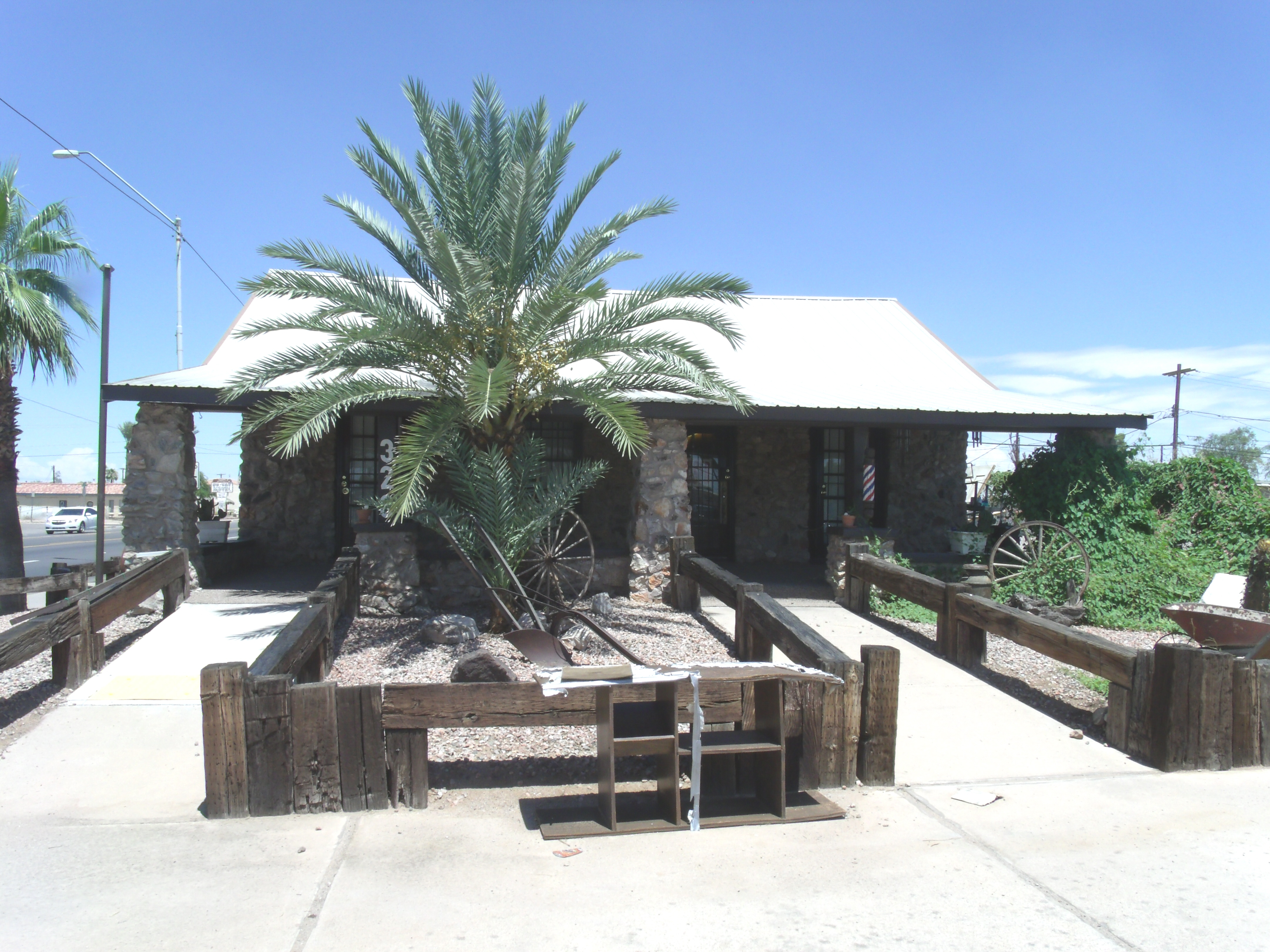
The House at 320 West Eighth Street a.k.a. The Stone Barber Shop

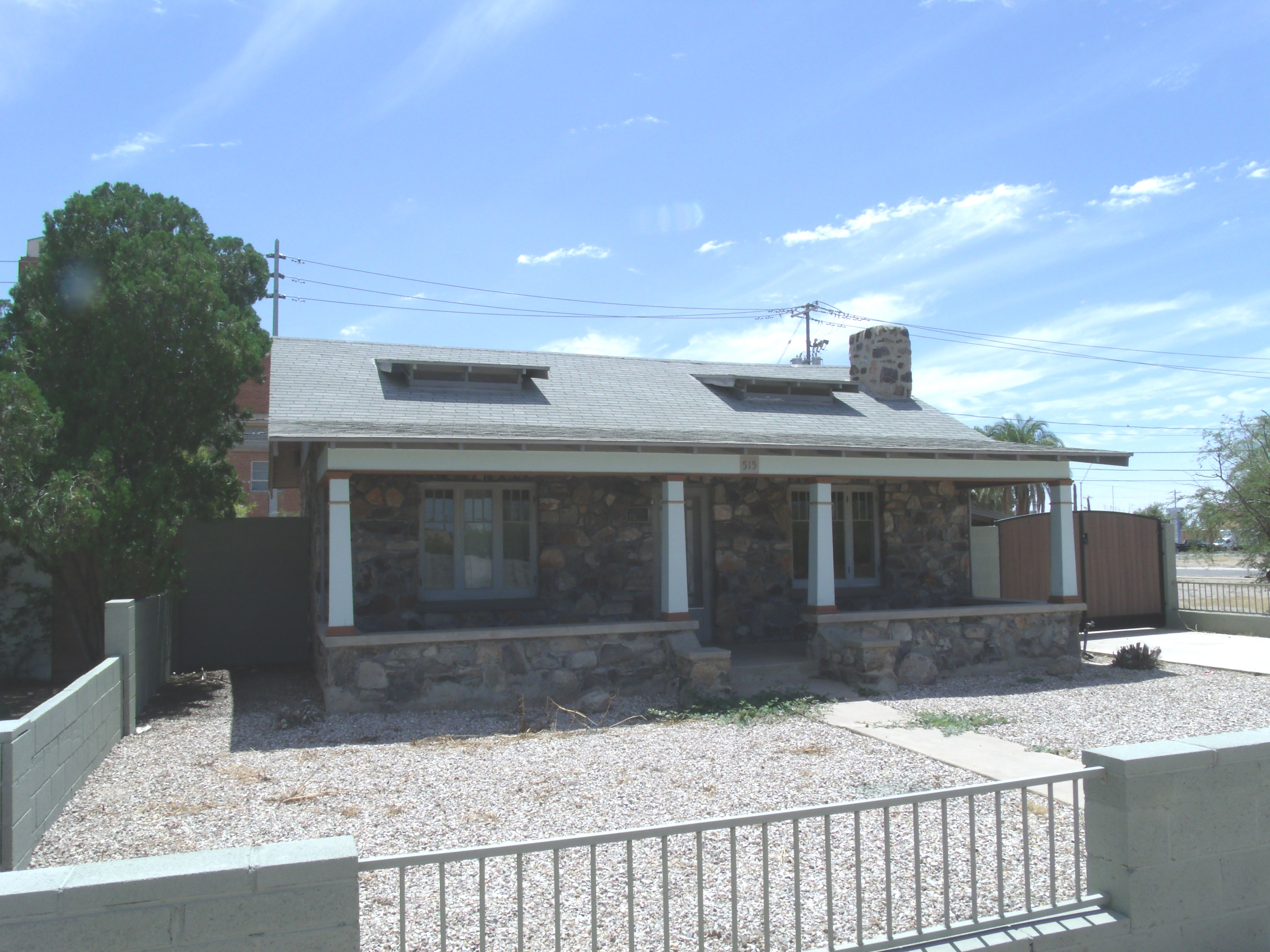
The Stone Bungalow

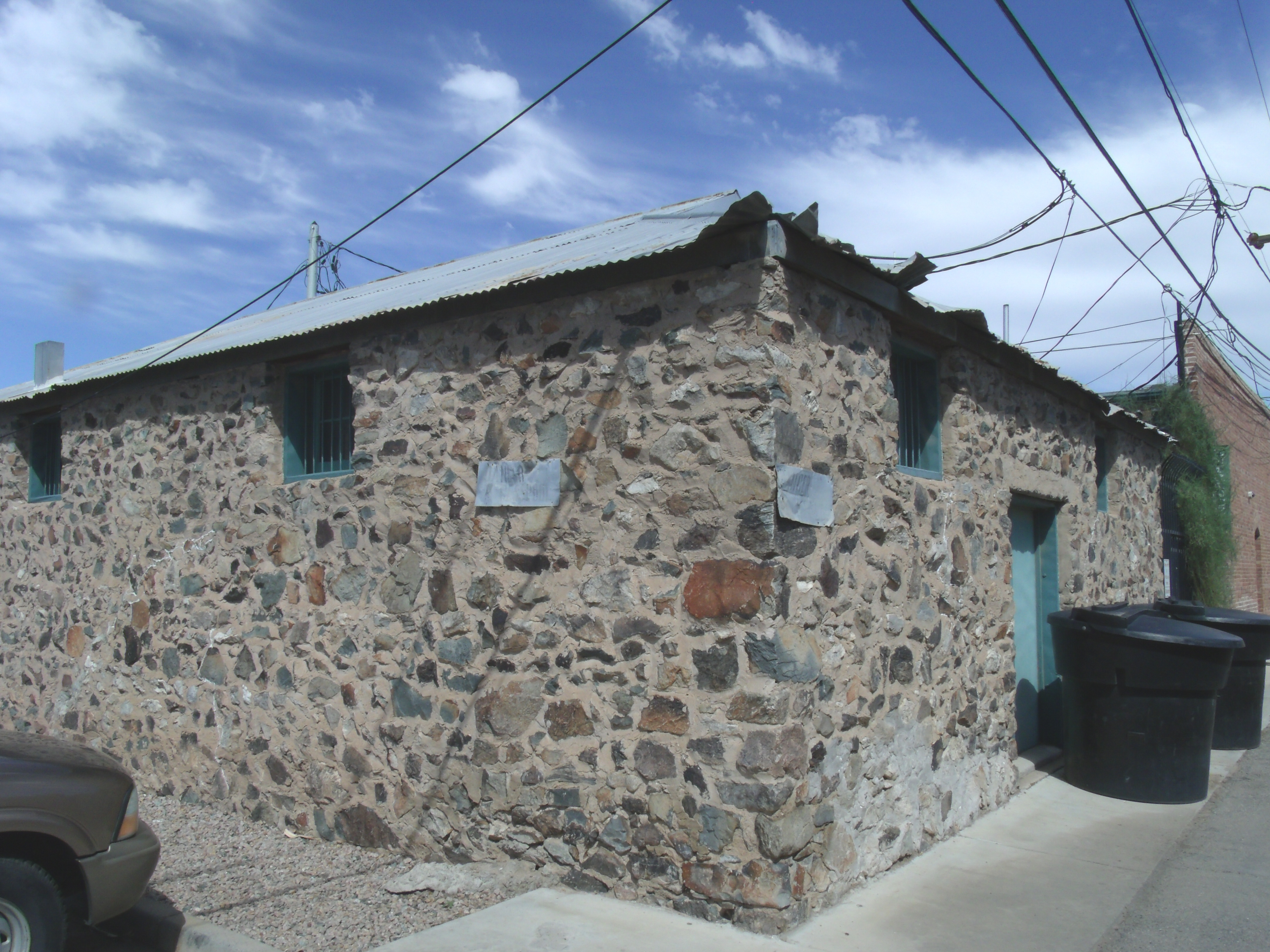
The Stone Warehouse

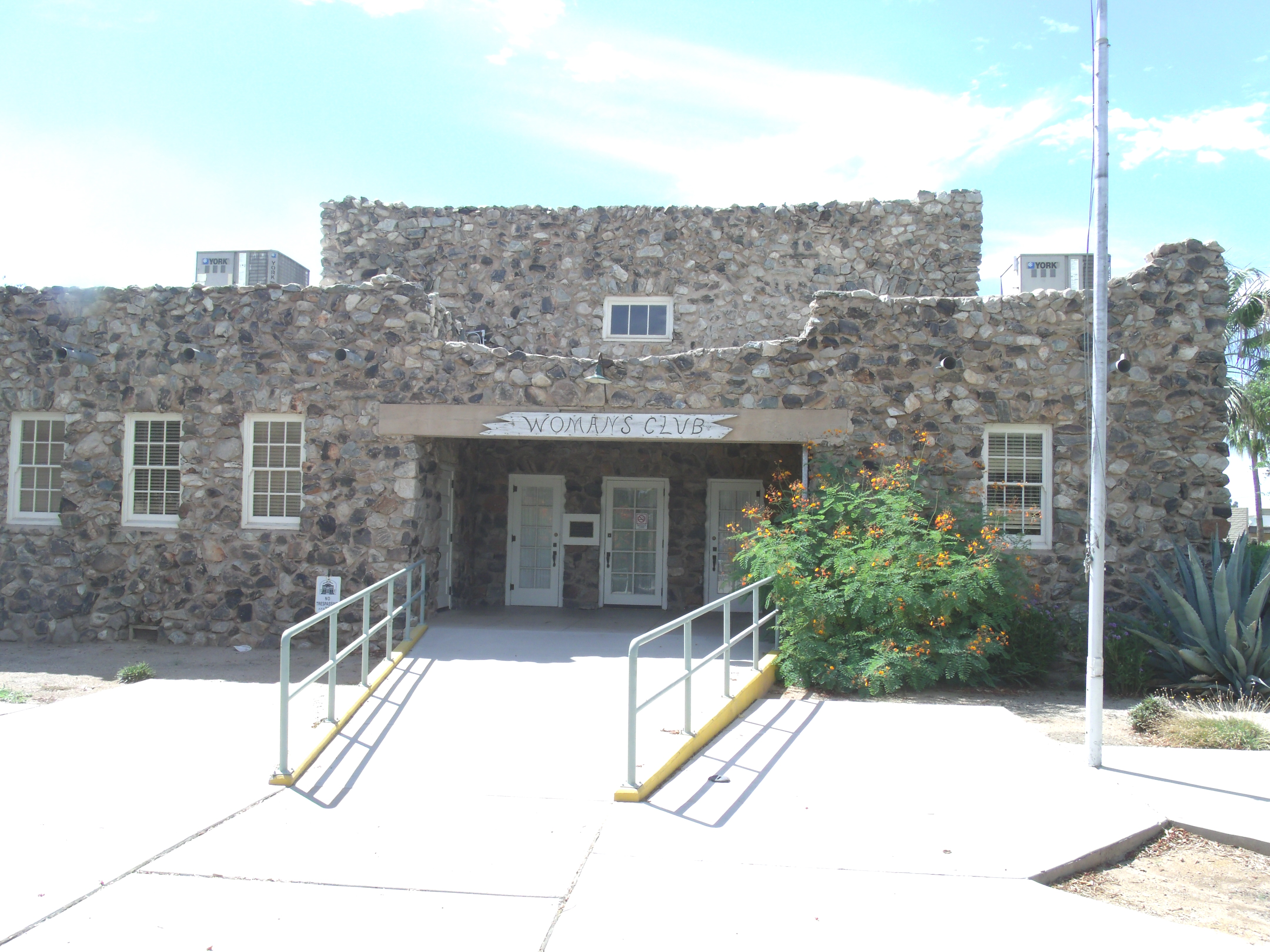
The Casa Grande Woman's Club Building

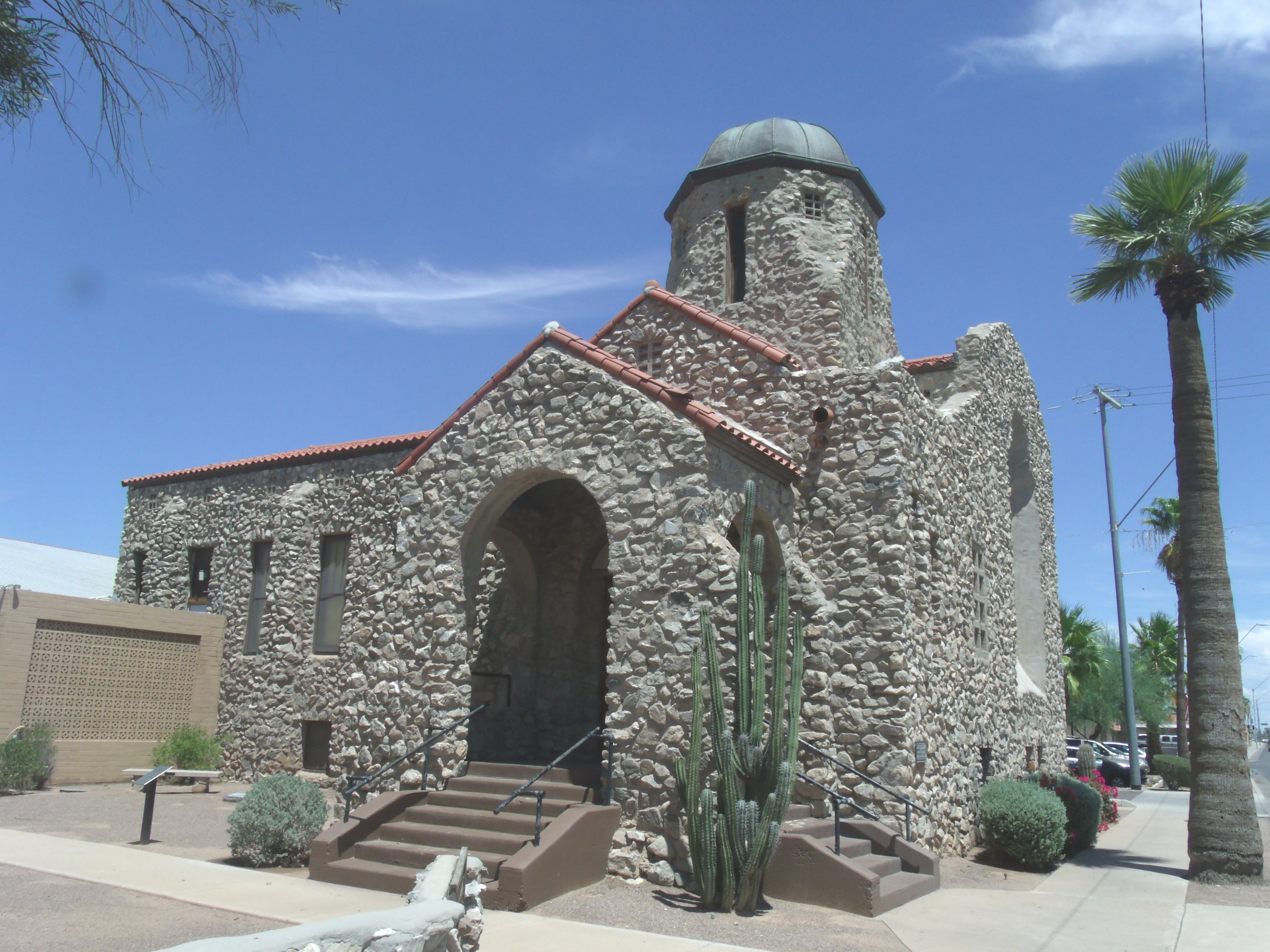
The Casa Grande Stone Church (now known as Heritage Hall)

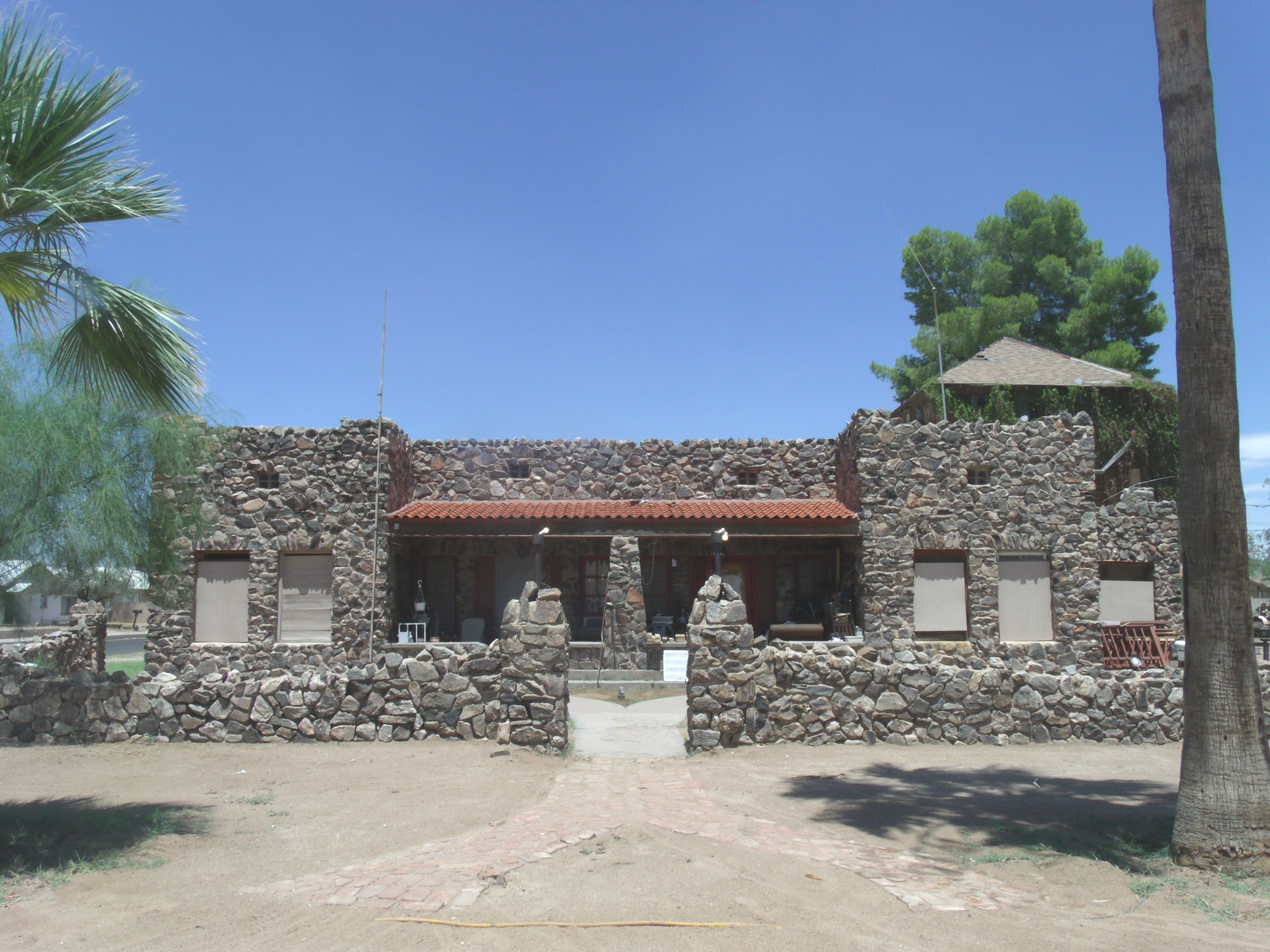
The Fisher Memorial Home (a house/funeral home combination)

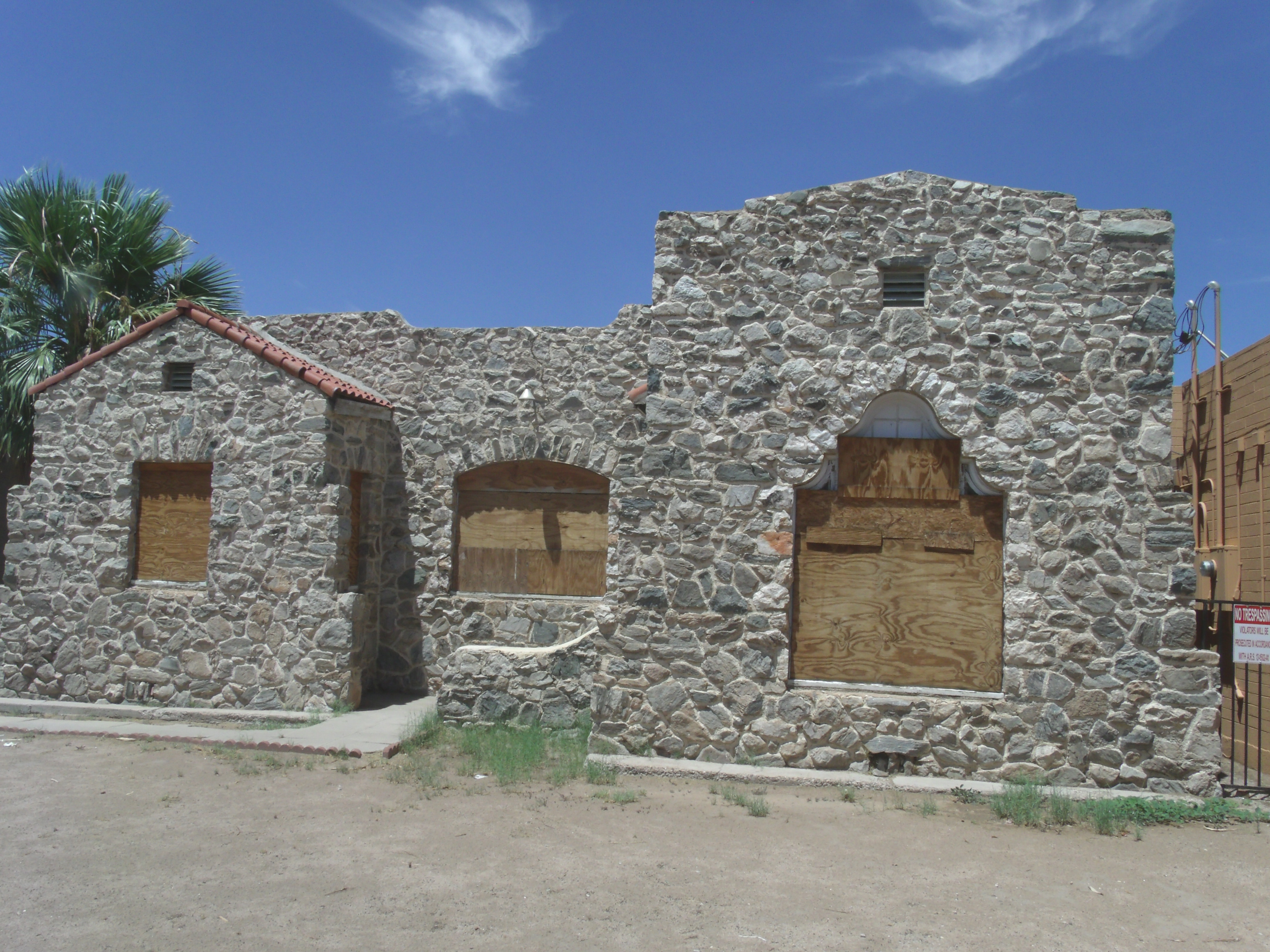
The Vasquez House

== See also ==
- Stonemasonry
- Clinton Campbell
- List of historic properties in Casa Grande, Arizona
- Casa Grande, Arizona

=== Arizona pioneers ===
- Mansel Carter
- Bill Downing
- Henry Garfias
- Winston C. Hackett
- John C. Lincoln
- Paul W. Litchfield
- Joe Mayer
- William John Murphy
- Wing F. Ong
- Levi Ruggles
- Sedona Schnebly
- Trinidad Swilling
- Ora Rush Weed
- Henry Wickenburg
