= Stone Warehouse (Casa Grande, Arizona) =

- U.S. National Register of Historic Places
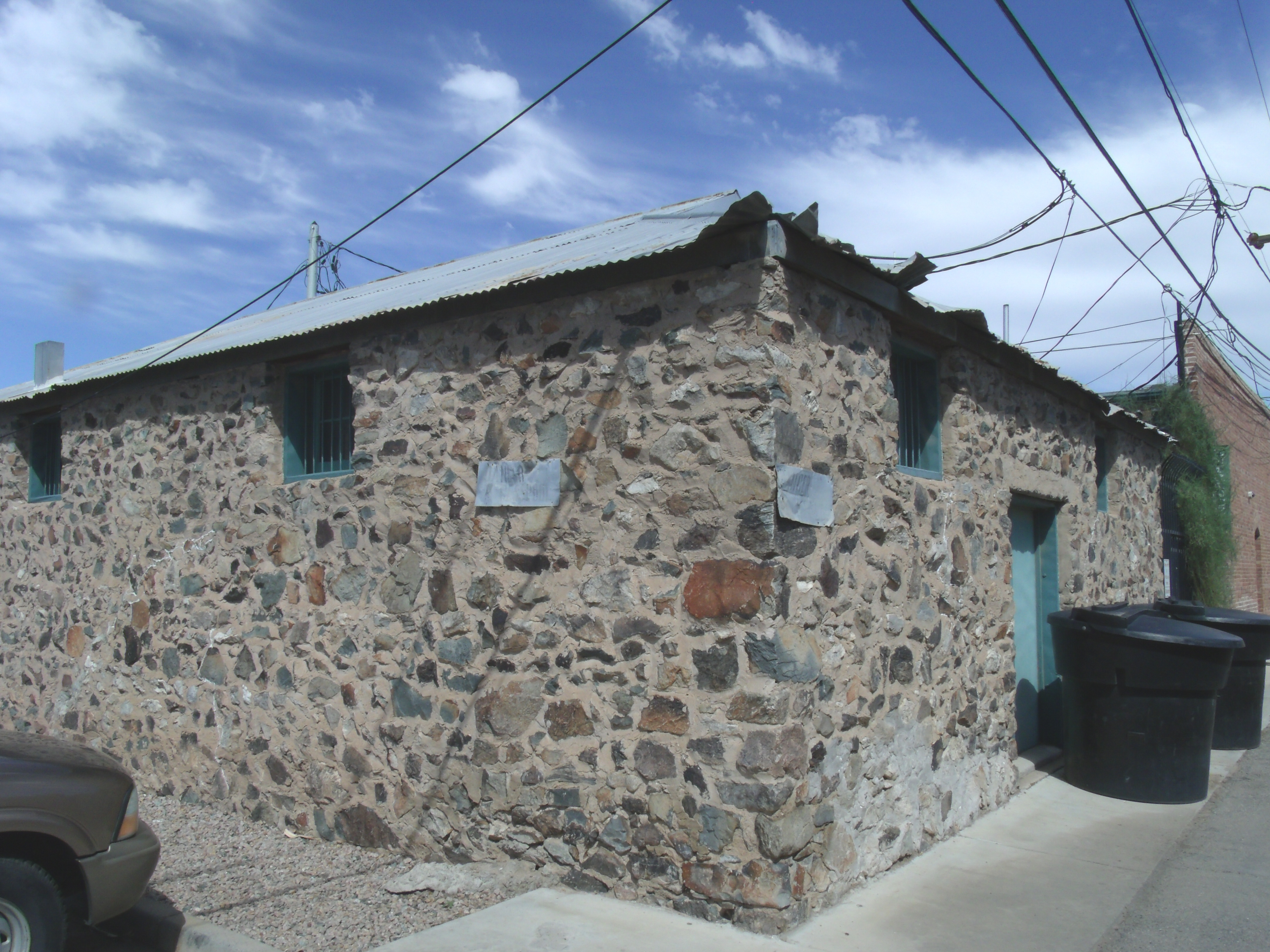

- Location within Arizona Location within the United States
- Location: 119 Florence St. in rear, Casa Grande, Arizona
- Coordinates: 32°52′35″N 111°45′17″W
- Area: less than one acre
- Built: 1922
- Built by: Sullivan, Mike
- MPS: Casa Grande MRA
- NRHP reference No.: 85000896
- Added to NRHP: April 16, 1985

The Stone Warehouse in Casa Grande, Arizona was built in 1922 by stonemason Michael Sullivan. It was listed on the National Register of Historic Places in 1985.

It is a single-story rectangular building made of field stone, with a corrugated metal hipped roof. It served as warehouse and cooler for the Pioneer Meat Market. Its Arizona historic property inventory states: "The building's most unusual feature is a metal roof covered with three feet of dirt and topped with another metal roof. It was reportedly the coolest warehouse in town."
