= Mary Thomas (politician) =

American politician (1944–2014)

Governor of the Gila River Indian Community
- In office 1994–2000
- Preceded by: Thomas R. White
- Succeeded by: Donald Antone

Personal details
- Born: April 29, 1944 Phoenix, Arizona
- Died: August 21, 2014 (aged 70) Chandler, Arizona
- Spouse: George Thomas

Mary V. Thomas (April 29, 1944 – August 21, 2014) was an American Pima politician and activist. Thomas was the first woman to serve as the Governor of the Gila River Indian Community, an office she held from 1994 to 2000. She also served as Lieutenant Governor of Gila River Indian Community for two tenures: The first term from 1990 to 1994, prior to becoming governor, and a second term beginning in 2003. An active participant in tribal politics, Thomas was also an activist on issues of importance to Native American communities, including poverty, water rights, and casinos.

== Biography ==
=== Early life ===
Thomas, a member of the Pima people, was born Mary Smith in Phoenix, Arizona, on April 29, 1944. Her parents were Elwood Dennis and Elizabeth Smith. She was raised in Sacaton, Arizona, in an adobe home, which her father had constructed, which lacked electricity until she was a teen. In a 1998 interview with The Arizona Republic, Thomas recalled her early life without electricity or indoor plumbing, saying "It was a way of life...We accepted it." She attended both Phoenix College and Central Arizona College after high school. She then worked a variety of jobs after college, including mortuary assistant, bus driver and teacher's aide. She married her husband, George Thomas, in 1968.

=== Political career ===
Mary Thomas had previously served on the Gila River council during the 1980s. In 1990, Gila River Governor Thomas White asked her to run for Lieutenant Governor as his running mate. Both won election. In 1994, White declined to seek re-election and encouraged Lt. Governor Mary Thomas to run for governor. She won election and became the first woman to serve as Governor of the Gila River Indian Community.

Thomas was a strong proponent of utilizing casino gaming as a tool to alleviate poverty and unemployment. The Gila River's first casino opened in 1994. Thomas soon appeared in a series of television commercials aimed at persuading Gila River members that profits from the casinos would be used to improve basic services and the quality of life. According to The Arizona Republic, Thomas soon became "known as the face of Indian casinos." In a speech given at the opening of the new casino in 1994, Thomas told attendees, "We don't have many of the simple things, like clean water and indoor plumbing, that many communities take for granted...Can you imagine having one fire engine for this whole reservation?"

Under Governor Thomas, the Gila River Indian Community established its own, independent police and fire departments. She also oversaw plans to build a new hospital on the reservation. Her two terms were not without some political disputes. Thomas survived an effort to recall her from office in 1998.

Thomas left office in 2000. She ran as a candidate for the Arizona House of Representatives in 2000, but lost the election. Thomas was frequently mentioned as a potential candidate for the United States House of Representatives within political circles in Arizona and Washington D.C. during the 2000s. However, she returned her focus back to the Gila River Indian Community and tribal issues. She was elected Lieutenant Governor of Gila River Indian Community in 2003 for her second, non-consecutive term in that office (She had previously served as Lt. Governor from 1990 to 1994). She unsuccessfully ran for Governor of Gila River Indian Community in 2011.

The University of Arizona honored Thomas by adding her to the school's Women's Plaza of Honor in April 2012.

Mary Thomas died from an undisclosed illness at Chandler Regional Medical Center in Chandler, Arizona, on August 21, 2014, at the age of 70. A widow, Thomas was a resident of Sacaton, Arizona.

== See also ==
- List of Native American politicians
- Native American women in politics
