= Casa Grande Woman's Club Building =

- U.S. National Register of Historic Places
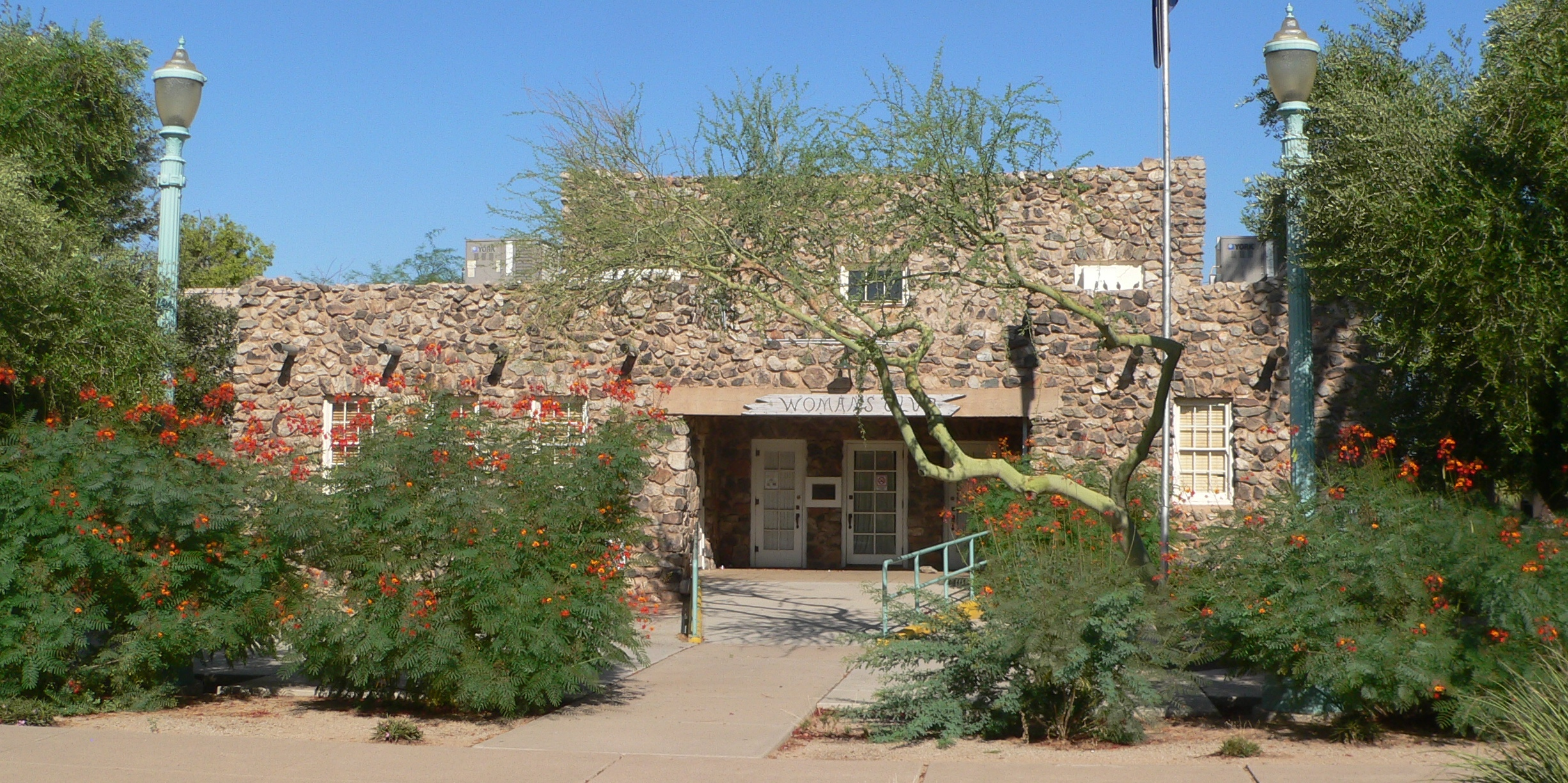

- Location within Arizona Location within the United States
- Location: 407 N. Sacaton Street, Casa Grande, Arizona
- Coordinates: 32.87933°N 111.754888°W
- Area: 0.7 acres (0.28 ha)
- Built: 1924
- Built by: Michael Sullivan
- Architect: Henry O. Jaastad
- Architectural style: Pueblo Revival, Cobblestone
- MPS: Casa Grande MRA, Casa Grande MRA (AD)
- NRHP reference No.: 79000425
- Added to NRHP: March 21, 1979

The Casa Grande Woman's Club Building, at 407 N. Sacaton Street in Casa Grande, Arizona, USA, is an historic women's club building which was listed on the National Register of Historic Places in 1979.

== The Casa Grande Woman's Club ==
Originally organized as the "Current Events Club" in 1913, the name was quickly changed to The Casa Grande Woman's Club and they joined the General Federation of Women's Clubs. The same year the Club founded the town's first library, an institution which they ran until 1953.

In 1921 the women organized a free school lunch program. In 1962 they organized the Casa Grande Valley Historical Society. The Casa Grande Woman's Club disbanded in 2006.

== Building ==
The Casa Grande Woman's Club Building was designed by Tucson architect Henry Jaastad and built by Michael Sullivan. It is a cobblestone-faced building, built in 1924 in the Pueblo Revival style. The Club Building was constructed with stones donated by club members, obtained from the nearby desert. In 1997 the Woman's Club sold the building to Casa Grande for $1.00. The building underwent a complete restoration which was completed in 2001, and won the Arizona Main Street award for Best Historic Rehabilitation in 2002, and the Governor's Honor Award in 2003. The wooden entrance sign was restored in restored 2014.

== Gallery ==
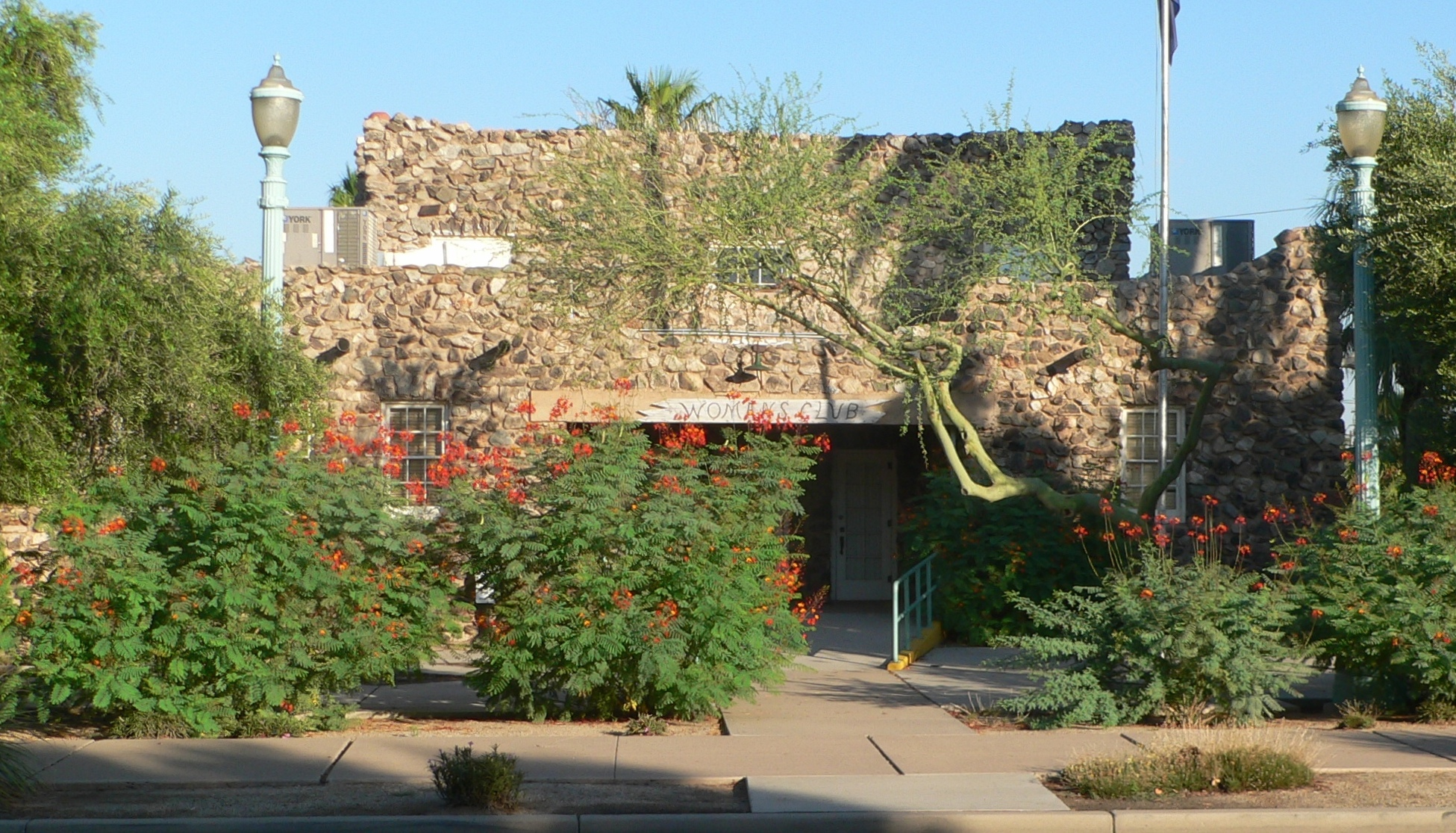
Casa Grande Woman's Club

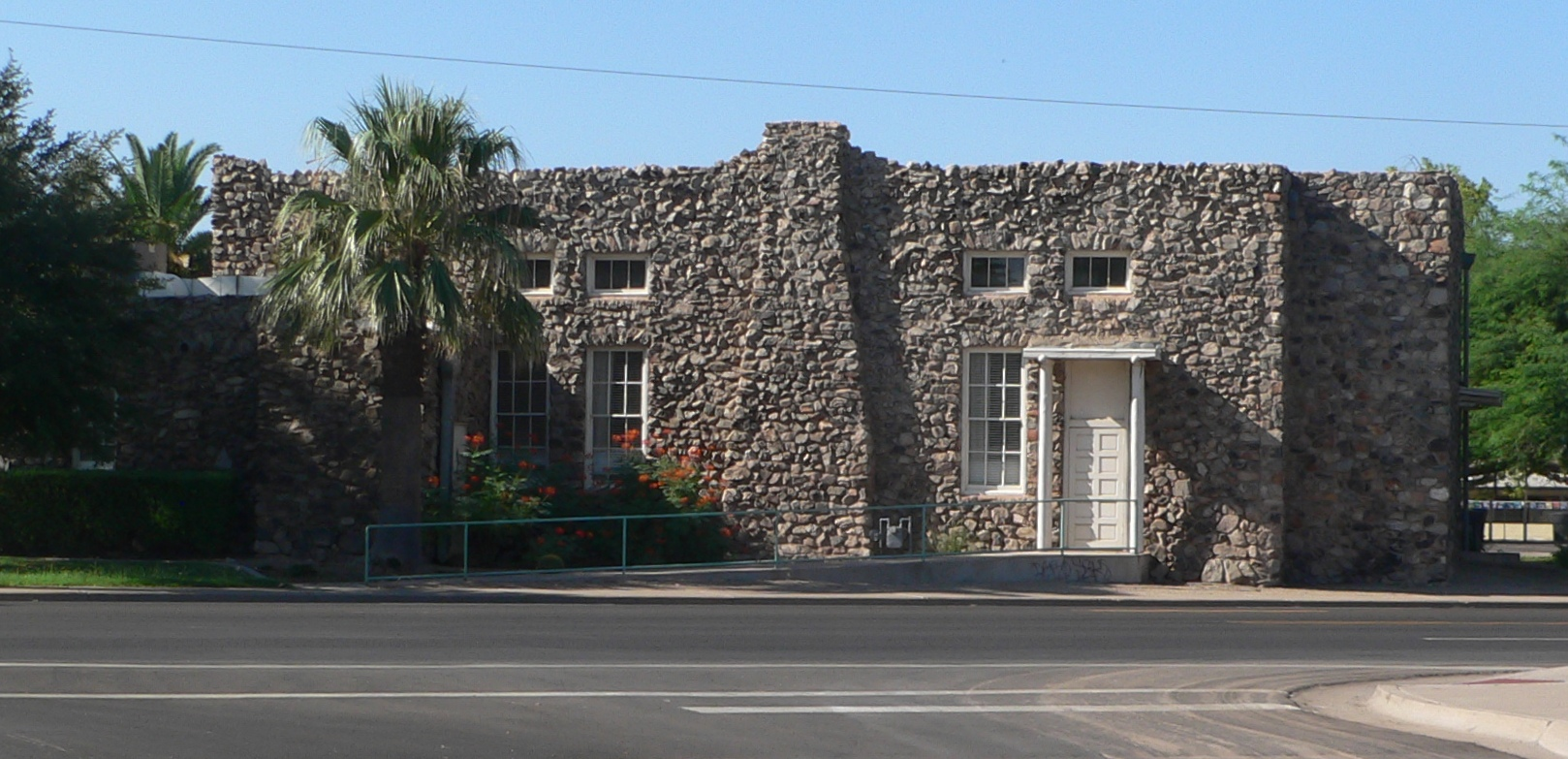
Casa Grande Woman's Club seen from the northeast
