= Casa Grande Stone Church =

Historic church in Arizona, United States

- U.S. National Register of Historic Places
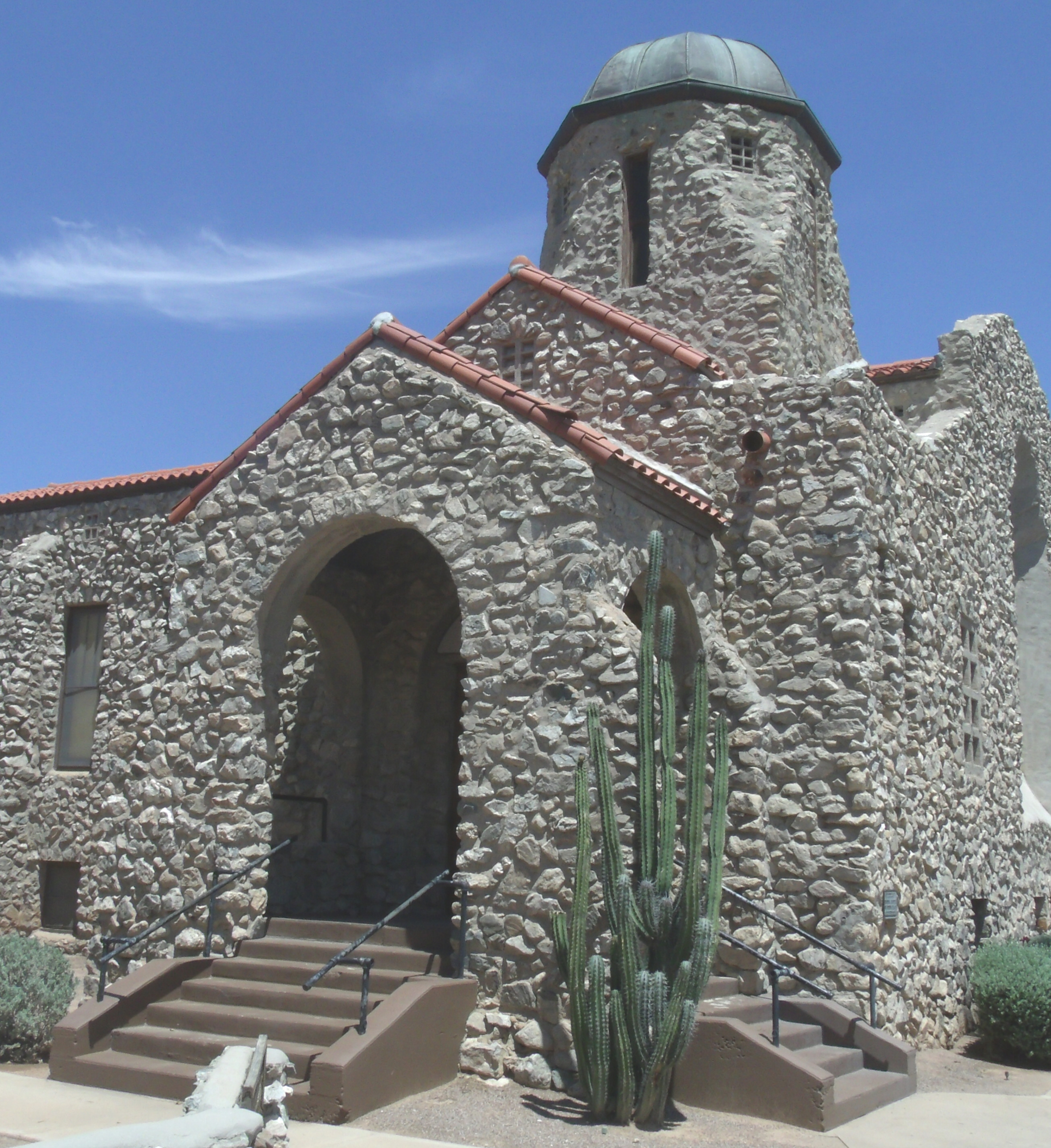

- Location within Arizona Location within the United States
- Location: 110 W. Florence Blvd, Casa Grande, Arizona
- Coordinates: 32°52′47.25″N 111°45′15.45″W
- Area: 0.3 acres (0.12 ha)
- Built: 1927
- Built by: Builder: Michael Sullivan; Architect: Robert Orr
- MPS: Casa Grande MRA (AD)
- NRHP reference No.: 78000567
- Added to NRHP: June 15, 1978

Casa Grande Stone Church is a church located at 110 West Florence Boulevard in Casa Grande, Arizona.

The church was originally built by Michael Sullivan, a local stonemason. It was the largest fieldstone building to be built by Sullivan in Casa Grande and served as the First Presbyterian Church of that town. Sullivan built the structure with the help of Los Angeles architect Robert Orr. The first service held in the church, with its glittering copper-plated dome, was in January 1928. The Casa Grande Historical Society acquired the Stone Church in June 1977. The building was added to the National Register of Historic Places in 1978. It is currently home to The Museum of Casa Grande.

== See also ==
- List of historic properties in Casa Grande, Arizona
