= Gila River Indian Community Emergency Medical Services =

Government agency in central Arizona, US

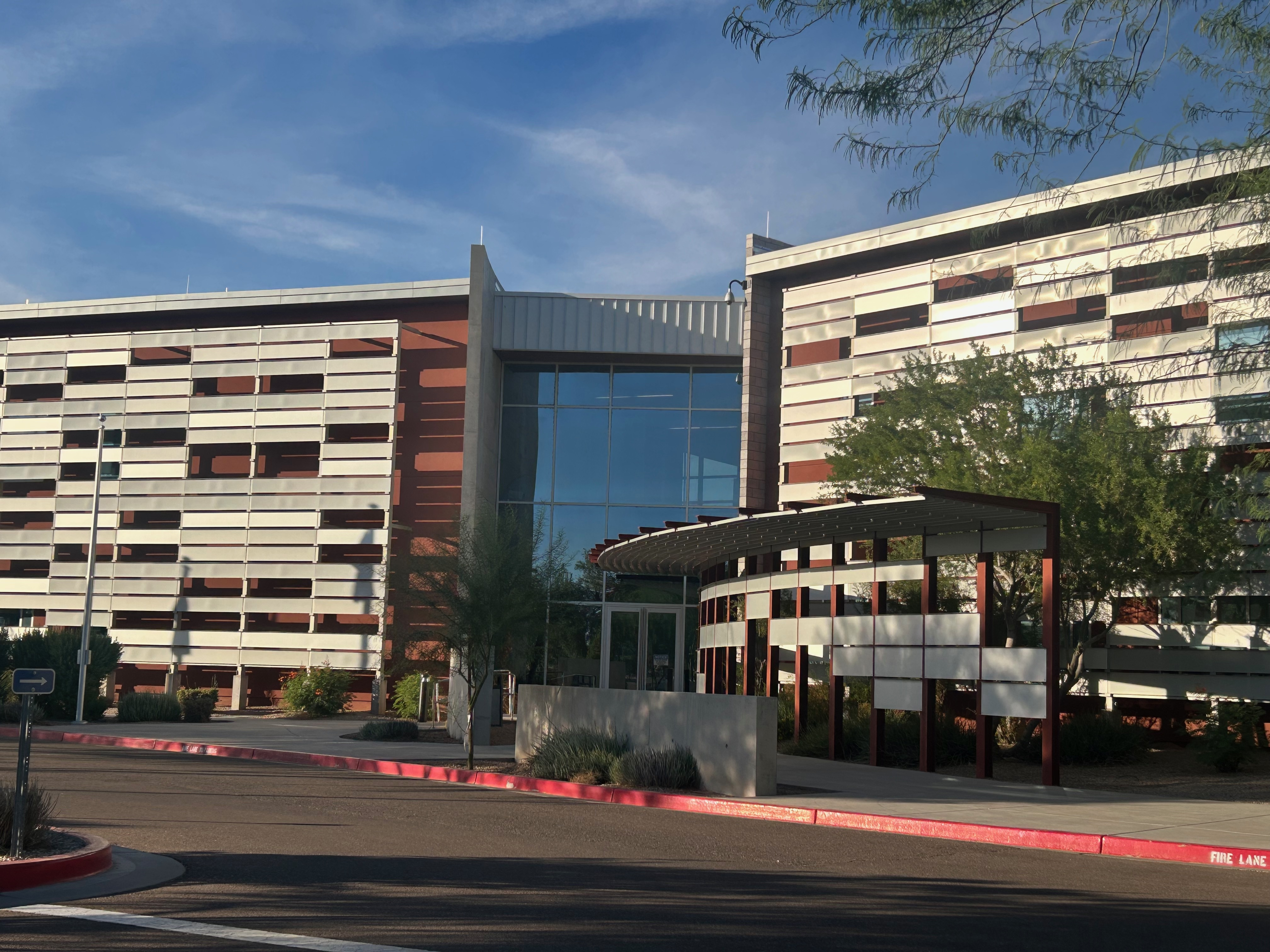
Gila River Health Care Building in Sacaton

The Gila River Indian Community Emergency Medical Services (a.k.a. Gila River EMS) provides paramedic, ambulance and rescue services for the Gila River Indian Community. A subsidiary of the tribally owned Gila River Healthcare hospital, Gila River EMS is considered a third service model (i.e., it operates independently from both fire and police departments, and from privately owned ambulance services) and provides emergency medical and rescue services to the Gila River Indian Community in conjunction with the Gila River Police Department and the Gila River Fire Department. Gila River EMS headquarters are located in Sacaton, Arizona.

Located in southern Maricopa County and northern Pinal County, Arizona, Gila River EMS operates 7 paramedic ambulances, 1 medium duty rescue unit, 1 multi-patient support unit and 3 Advanced Life Support Command units working out of 5 stations. Gila River EMS employs approximately 80 full and part-time staff certified at the Basic EMT and Paramedic levels. All administrative staff are certified by the State of Arizona at the paramedic level.

In addition to providing 9-1-1 emergency services, the department is heavily involved in community services. It provides stand-by services for community events and operates a public relations group that attends local health fairs and community events to promote safety and health issues. It provides free CPR training, first responder and Basic EMT training. The Department administers a community-wide public access Automated external defibrillator program. Gila River EMS participates in numerous local, state and national EMS committees and organizations.

In 2007 Gila River EMS was recognized by the National Native American EMS Association as the EMS Service of the Year.

== Public Safety Stations & Apparatus ==
Fire Station Number	Address	Engine Company	Ladder Company	Battalion Chief	Other units	EMS Medic Unit
Public Safety Station 421	829 W. Blackwater School Rd	Engine 421			Brush 421	Medic 431
Public Safety Station 423	599 E. Seed Fard Rd.	Engine 423		Battalion 421	Brush 423 Tender 423	Medic 432 Medic 433
Public Safety Station 426	9851 W. Pecos Road	Engine 426			Brush 426	
Public Safety Station 429	5002 N. Maricopa Road		Ladder 429		Ladder Tender 429 HazMat 429	Medic 439
EMS Base 100	433 W Seed Farm Road			EMS 431	Rehab 433	
EMS Base 200	17425 S Healthcare Drive			EMS 432		Medic 436 Medic 437
EMS Station 435	962 N. Orchard Road					Medic 434 Medic 435
EMS Station 438	3042 W Queen Creek Road					Medic 438
