= Battle of Cantigny =

1918 first major American battle and offensive of World War I

- Part of the Western Front of World War I
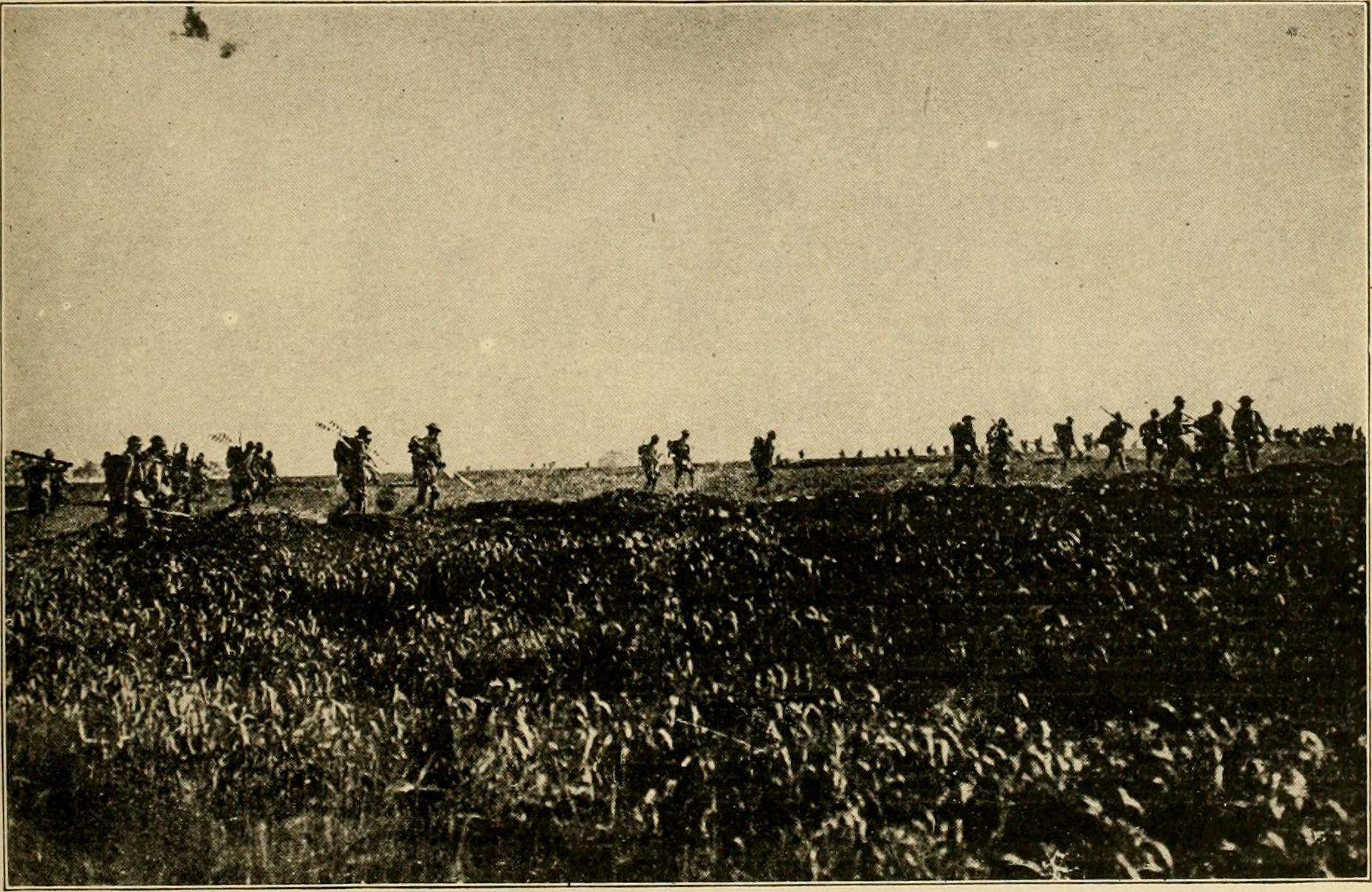
- Battle of Cantigny
Date	28 May 1918
Location	Cantigny 49.664°N 2.491°E
Result	Allied victory

Belligerents
United States; France	German Empire

Commanders and leaders
(United States) Robert Lee Bullard	(German Empire) Oskar von Hutier

Strength
~4,000	Unknown

Casualties and losses
(United States) 1,603 casualties (318 killed)	1,400 killed and wounded 250 captured

The Battle of Cantigny, fought May 28, 1918, was the first major American battle and offensive of World War I. The U.S. 1st Division, the most experienced of the five American divisions then in France and in reserve for the French Army near the village of Cantigny, was selected for the attack. The objective of the attack was to reduce a small salient made by the German Army in the front lines but also to instill confidence among the French.

== Capture of Cantigny ==
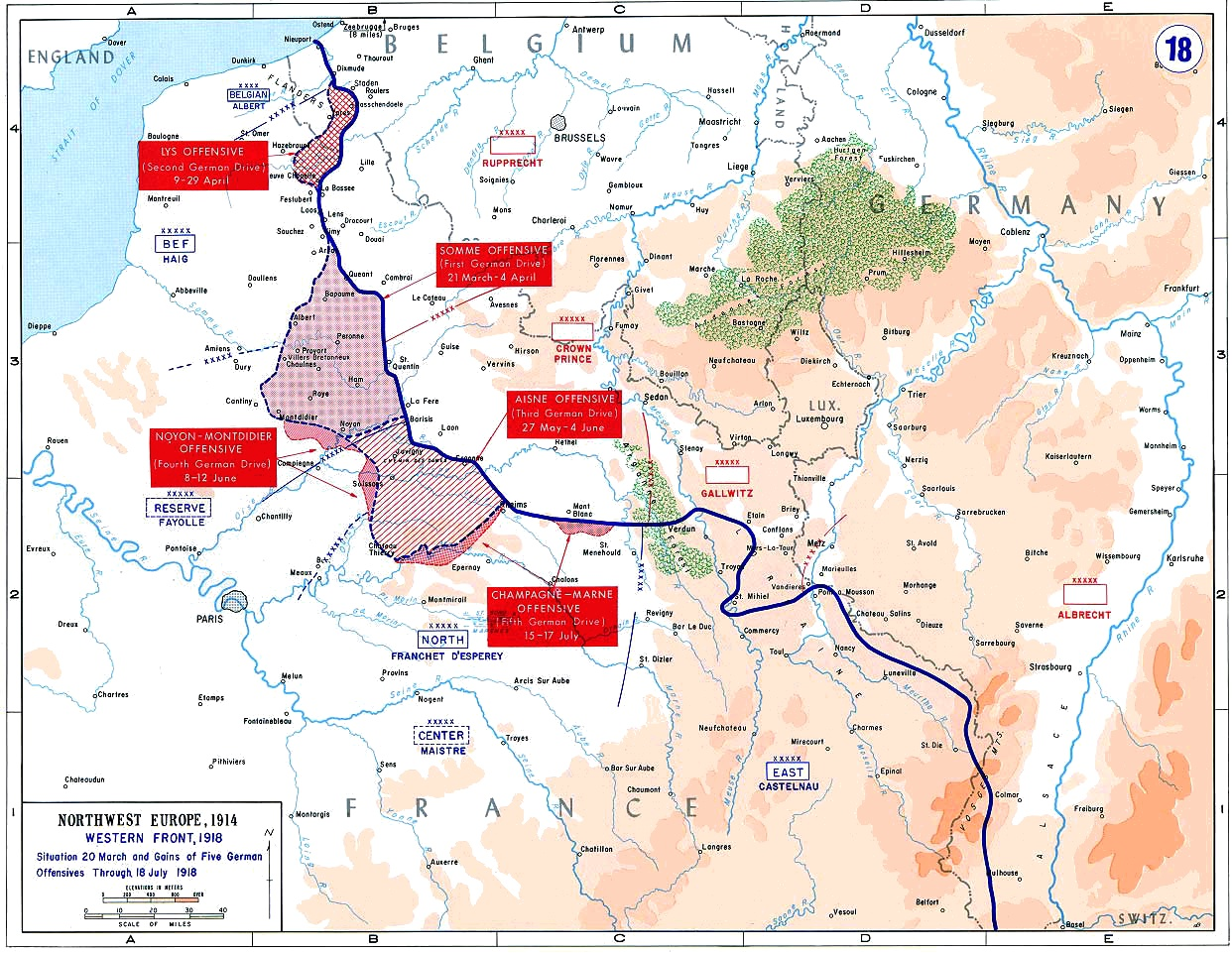
Map showing the furthest German advances during the Michael Offensive.

At 06:45 (H Hour) on May 28, 1918, American soldiers of the 28th Infantry Regiment left their jump-off trenches following an hour-long artillery preparation. Part of the preparation was counter-battery fire directed at German artillery positions. A rolling barrage, advancing 100 meters every two minutes, was calculated to give the attacking troops time to keep up with it. The 28th Infantry Regiment (Colonel Hanson Edward Ely, commanding) plus two companies of the 18th Infantry Regiment, three machine-gun companies and a company of engineers (3,564 men), captured Cantigny from units of the German Eighteenth Army. The village was situated on high ground surrounded by woods, making it an ideal observation post for German artillery. Because the Americans did not have them in sufficient quantity, the French provided air cover, 368 heavy artillery pieces, trench mortars, tanks, and flamethrowers. The French Schneider tanks were from the French 5th Tank Battalion. Their primary purpose was to eliminate German machine gun positions. With this massive support, and advancing on schedule behind the creeping artillery barrage, the 28th Infantry took the village in 30 minutes. It then continued on to its final objective roughly a half kilometer beyond the village.

== Defense against German counterattacks ==
The first German counterattack, a small attack at 08:30 against the extreme right of the new American position, was easily repulsed, but German artillery bombarded the 28th Infantry for most of the day. At 17:10 the first large-scale counterattack took place, and a company of the 1st Battalion of the 26th Infantry Regiment commanded by Major Theodore Roosevelt Jr. was used to reinforce a weak spot in the American line. Another German counterattack at 18:40 was also repulsed by a combination of artillery and infantry defensive fire. A series of counterattacks over the next two days were also defeated by both American regiments, and the position held. The Americans reduced the salient and expanded their front by approximately a mile. A minor success, its significance was overshadowed by the battle underway along the Aisne. The U.S. forces held their position with the loss of 1,603 casualties, including 199 killed in action; they captured 250 German prisoners. Matthew B. Juan, a Pima American Indian, was killed during this battle, the first known Arizonan to die in combat in World War I. The American success at Cantigny assured the French that American divisions could be depended upon in the line against the German offensive to take Paris. The victory at Cantigny was followed by attacks at Château-Thierry and Belleau Wood in the first half of June.

== Monuments ==
=== Battle ===
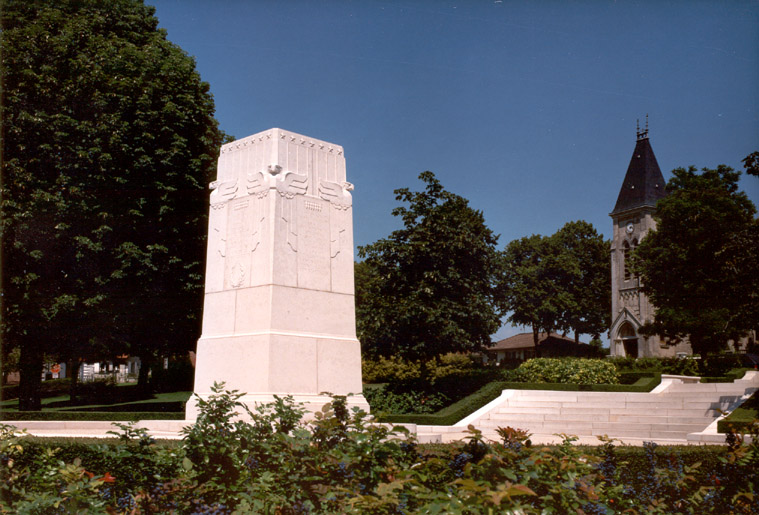
American Battle Monument Commission's monument of the Battle of Cantigny standing in Cantigny, France.

In 1923, The American Battle Monuments Commission (ABMC) erected 25 battle monuments, including one in the village of Cantigny that was dedicated on August 9, 1937. At the unveiling of this monument, a speech was given (at the invitation of General John J. Pershing) by Col. Robert R. McCormick, who had commanded the 1st Battalion of the 5th Field Artillery Regiment at the battle. McCormick had already memorialized the American victory, and his part in it, by renaming his family's 500-acre estate outside Chicago Cantigny. On one side of the memorial appears the inscription:

ERECTED BY THE UNITED STATES OF AMERICA TO COMMEMORATE THE FIRST ATTACK BY AN AMERICAN DIVISION IN THE WORLD WAR.

On another side of the memorial appears the inscription:

THE FIRST DIVISION UNITED STATES ARMY OPERATING UNDER THE X FRENCH CORPS CAPTURED THE TOWN OF CANTIGNY ON MAY 28 1918 AND HELD IT AGAINST NUMEROUS COUNTERATTACKS.

French translations of these inscriptions appear on the opposite sides of the monument.

=== First Division ===
A First Division Monument located along the road ½ mile southeast of Cantigny is one of five erected by the First Division itself in 1919. The names of the dead in the vicinity of Cantigny are engraved on the bronze plates. The monument is like a small concrete shaft, surmounted by a carved eagle of stone.

=== McCormick ===
In the center of Cantigny, a small monument was dedicated in 2005 by the McCormick Foundation to commemorate the participation of Colonel Robert R. McCormick in the historic 1st Battalion, 5th Field Artillery, the oldest American military unit on continuous active duty (dating back to the American Revolutionary War), then part of the First Division. In 1960, the McCormick Foundation opened the Cantigny War Memorial of the First Division, where materials from Chicago veterans were then collected.

=== Black Lions ===
On May 28, 2008, the 90th anniversary of the Battle of Cantigny, the McCormick Foundation and the Association of the 28th Infantry Regiment dedicated the statue "The Lion of Cantigny," an original bronze work by Stephen Spears depicting a doughboy of the regiment advancing through the village. The 28th Infantry was the assault regiment in the First Division's attack, the first major US battle of World War I. The regimental coat of arms is based on the lions in the heraldic arms of Picardy, where Cantigny is; the regiment's nickname is Black Lions.

== See also ==
- Cantigny Park
- Somme American Cemetery and Memorial

== Bibliography ==
Notes

References

- Davenport, Matthew J. (2015). First Over There: The Attack on Cantigny, America's First Battle of World War I. Macmillan. ISBN 9781466860278. - Total pages: 336
- Duffy, Michael (2017). "First World War.com – Battles – The Battle of Cantigny, 1918". FirstWorldWar.com.
- Fleming, Thomas (2000). "Colonel McCormick's War". American Heritage. 51 (2): 90. ISSN 0002-8738.
- Sandler, Stanley (2002). Ground Warfare: An International Encyclopedia, Volume 1. ABC-CLIO. ISBN 9781576073445. - Total pages: 1067
- Stoffan, Mark A. (2010). "American Battle Monuments Commission". College & Research Libraries News. 71 (10): 563. ISSN 0099-0086.
- Trout, Steven (2002). Memorial Fictions: Willa Cather and the First World War. University of Nebraska Press. ISBN 9780803244429. - Total pages: 225
- Zabecki, David T. (2014). Germany at War: 400 Years of Military History [4 volumes]: 400 Years of Military History. ABC-CLIO. ISBN 9781598849813. - Total pages: 1797
