= Cantigny, Somme =

Cantigny
- Commune
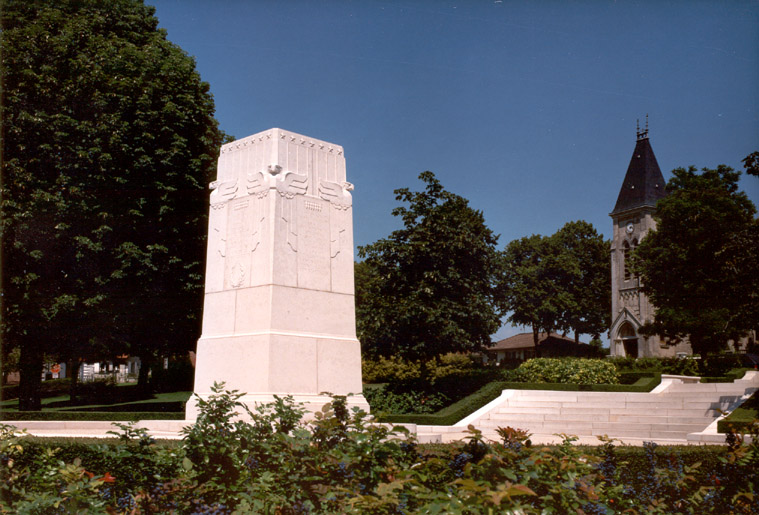
- The Cantigny Memorial
- Location of Cantigny
- Location within France Location within Hauts-de-France
- Coordinates: 49°39′51″N 2°29′35″E
- Country: France
- Region: Hauts-de-France
- Department: Somme
- Arrondissement: Montdidier
- Canton: Roye
- Intercommunality: CC Grand Roye

Government
  - Mayor (2020–2026): Noël Bauwens
- Area^{1}: 4.03 km^{2} (1.56 sq mi)
- Elevation: 104 m (341 ft)
- Highest elevation: 112 m (367 ft)
- Lowest elevation: 64 m (210 ft)
- Population (2023): 110
  - Density: 27/km^{2} (71/sq mi)
- Time zone: UTC+01:00 (CET)
  - Summer (DST): UTC+02:00 (CEST)
- INSEE/Postal code: 80170 /80500
- ^{1} French Land Register data, which excludes lakes, ponds, glaciers > 1 km^{2} (0.386 sq mi or 247 acres) and river estuaries.

Cantigny (French pronunciation: [kɑ̃tiɲi]; Picard: Cantegny) is a commune in the Somme department in Hauts-de-France in northern France.

== History ==
During World War I, a battle liberated the town from German forces. Major General Robert Lee Bullard commanded the US First Division in the United States' first victory of the war. About 10 years later, Colonel Robert R. McCormick named his estate in Illinois after the town.

== Geography ==
Cantigny is situated on the D28 road, some 20 miles (32 km) southeast of Amiens.

== Population ==
Historical population
Year	Pop.	±% p.a.
1968	117	—
1975	116	−0.12%
1982	123	+0.84%
1990	131	+0.79%
1999	124	−0.61%
2007	116	−0.83%
2012	105	−1.97%
2017	114	+1.66%
2023	110	−0.59%
Source: INSEE

== See also ==
- Communes of the Somme department
