= C.H. Cook Memorial Church =

Historic church in Arizona, United States

- C. H. Cook Memorial Church
- Formerly listed on the U.S. National Register of Historic Places
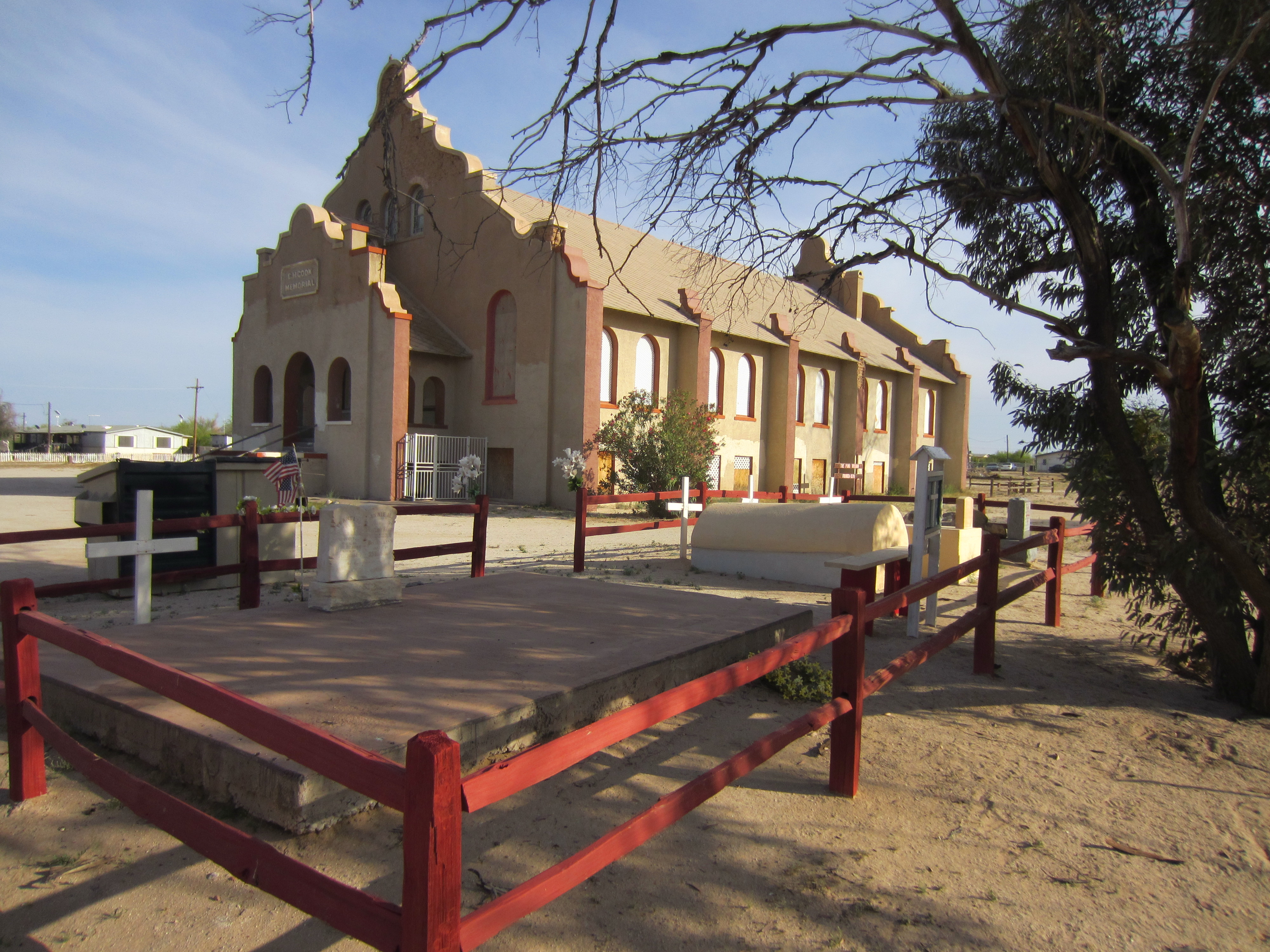

- Location within Arizona Location within the United States
- Location: Church St., Sacaton, Arizona
- Coordinates: 33°4′44″N 111°44′28″W
- Area: 1 acre (0.40 ha)
- Built: 1887
- Architectural style: Mission/spanish Revival
- NRHP reference No.: 75000359

Significant dates
- Added to NRHP: August 28, 1975
- Removed from NRHP: May 13, 2019

C. H. Cook Memorial Church was a historic Presbyterian church on Church Street in Sacaton, Arizona. It was a large, two-story (approximately 6,000 square feet) mission revival building built of adobe and cement. The addition of the cement allowed for the unusual height for an adobe building. The church was one of the few two-story adobe buildings in Arizona, and could hold approximately 400 people. There is a small cemetery in the churchyard which includes the graves of the son and first wife of Dr. Cook, who died in 1884 and 1889 respectively.

The first church began in April 1889. The C. H. Cook Memorial Church was constructed in 1918 and added to the National Register in 1975. It was believed to be the oldest Presbyterian church in Arizona. The congregation moved to a new neighboring building in the 1980s.

The vacant church was destroyed in a fire on March 25, 2019.
