= Sacaton, Arizona =

CDP in Pinal County, Arizona

Sacaton, Arizona O'odham: Geʼe Ki:
- CDP
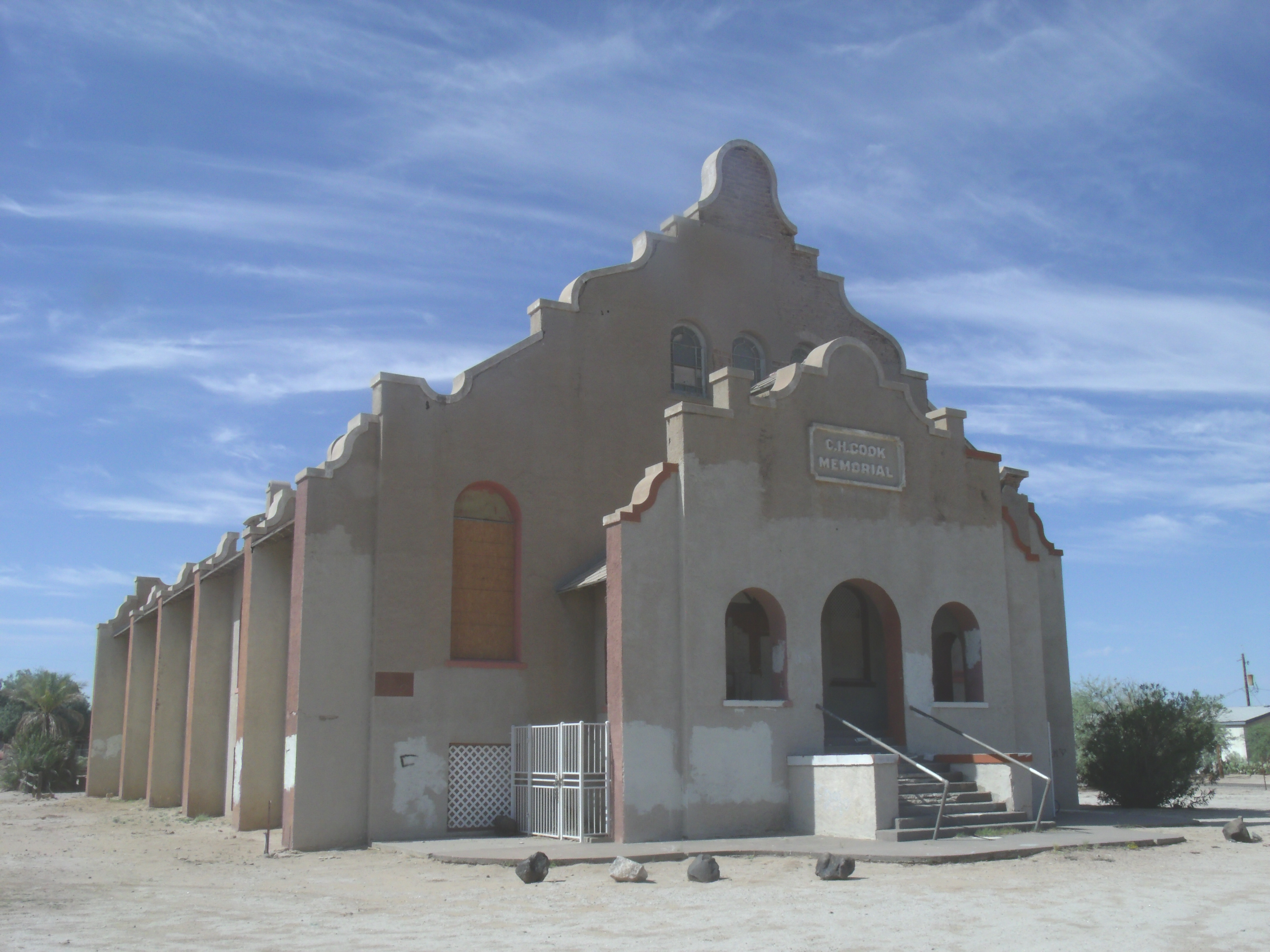
- The C. H. Cook Memorial Church, listed in the National Register of Historic Places

- Location in Pinal County and the state of Arizona

- Location in the United States
- Coordinates: 33°4′48″N 111°44′45″W
- Country: United States
- State: Arizona
- County: Pinal

Area
  - Total: 9.29 sq mi (24.06 km^{2})
  - Land: 9.29 sq mi (24.06 km^{2})
  - Water: 0 sq mi (0.00 km^{2})
- Elevation: 1,283 ft (391 m)

Population (2020)
  - Total: 3,254
  - Density: 350.2/sq mi (135.23/km^{2})
- Time zone: UTC-7 (MST (no DST))
- ZIP code: 85147
- Area code: 520
- FIPS code: 04-61720
- GNIS feature ID: 10623

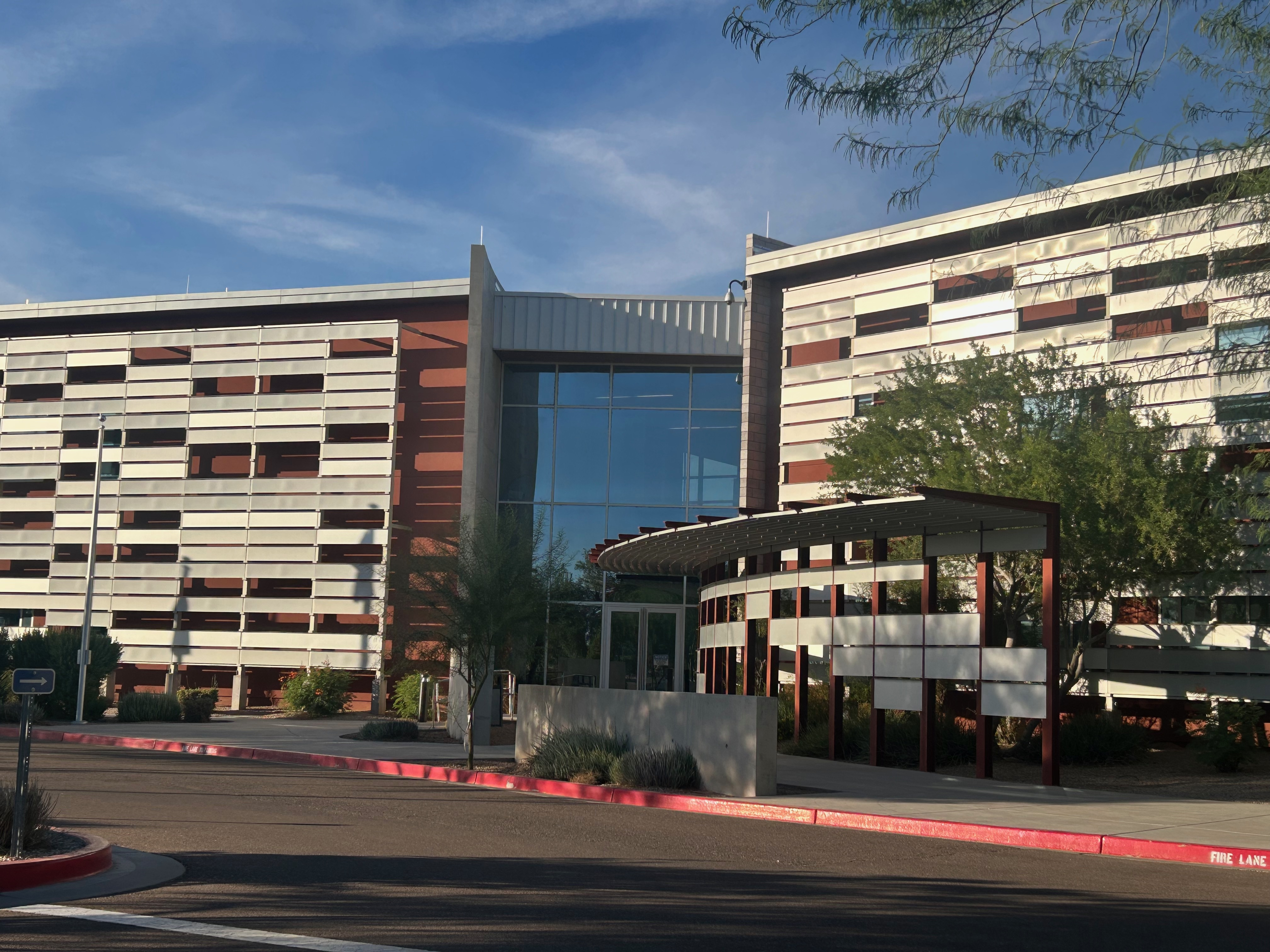
Gila River Health Care Administration Building

Sacaton (Pima: Geʼe Ki: Big House) is a census-designated place (CDP) in Pinal County, Arizona, United States. The population was 3,254 at the 2020 census. It is the capital of the Gila River Indian Community.

== Geography ==
According to the United States Census Bureau, the CDP has a total area of 2.4 square miles (6.2 km^{2}), all land.

== Demographics ==
Historical population
Census	Pop.	Note	%±
2020	3,254		—
U.S. Decennial Census

=== 2020 census ===
As of the 2020 census, Sacaton had a population of 3,254. The median age was 27.8 years. 32.8% of residents were under the age of 18 and 8.1% of residents were 65 years of age or older. For every 100 females there were 92.1 males, and for every 100 females age 18 and over there were 89.8 males age 18 and over.

0.0% of residents lived in urban areas, while 100.0% lived in rural areas.

There were 714 households in Sacaton, of which 48.6% had children under the age of 18 living in them. Of all households, 20.7% were married-couple households, 22.8% were households with a male householder and no spouse or partner present, and 46.4% were households with a female householder and no spouse or partner present. About 19.7% of all households were made up of individuals and 5.9% had someone living alone who was 65 years of age or older.

There were 723 housing units, of which 1.2% were vacant. The homeowner vacancy rate was 0.0% and the rental vacancy rate was 0.0%.

Racial composition as of the 2020 census
Race	Number	Percent
White	28	0.9%
Black or African American	5	0.2%
American Indian and Alaska Native	3,066	94.2%
Asian	1	0.0%
Native Hawaiian and Other Pacific Islander	0	0.0%
Some other race	90	2.8%
Two or more races	64	2.0%
Hispanic or Latino (of any race)	275	8.5%

=== 2000 census ===
As of the census of 2000, there were 1,584 people, 378 households, and 303 families residing in the CDP. The population density was 667.1 inhabitants per square mile (257.6/km^{2}). There were 387 housing units at an average density of 163.0 per square mile (62.9/km^{2}). The racial makeup of the CDP was 2.0% White, 95.0% Native American, 0.1% Asian, 0.6% from other races, and 2.3% from two or more races. 7.1% of the population were Hispanic or Latino of any race.

There were 378 households, out of which 40.7% had children under the age of 18 living with them, 26.2% were married couples living together, 41.3% had a female householder with no husband present, and 19.6% were non-families. 15.3% of all households were made up of individuals, and 5.8% had someone living alone who was 65 years of age or older. The average household size was 3.80 and the average family size was 4.12.

In the CDP, the population was spread out, with 38.4% under the age of 18, 11.7% from 18 to 24, 28.4% from 25 to 44, 16.0% from 45 to 64, and 5.6% who were 65 years of age or older. The median age was 25 years. For every 100 females, there were 95.1 males. For every 100 females age 18 and over, there were 97.6 males.

The median income for a household in the CDP was $18,276, and the median income for a family was $20,766. Males had a median income of $25,882 versus $23,750 for females. The per capita income for the CDP was $6,425. About 36.4% of families and 39.9% of the population were below the poverty line, including 45.4% of those under age 18 and 31.1% of those age 65 or over.

== History ==
Sacaton is one and one-quarter miles west of the 1858–1861 location of the Socatoon Station of the Butterfield Overland Mail. The station was named for the nearby Maricopa village of Sacaton, four miles down the Gila from the station. It was an adobe building established in 1858 on the Little Gila river also known as Capron's Rancho and was also a trading post.

== Notable people ==
- Ira Hayes – Pima Native American and United States Marine who assisted in raising the flag on Iwo Jima on February 23, 1945, was born and raised in the Sacaton area.
- Mary Thomas – Governor of the Gila River Indian Community (1994–2000)

== See also ==
- Gila River Indian Community Emergency Medical Services
- Hohokam Pima National Monument
