= National Register of Historic Places listings in Pinal County, Arizona =

Location of Pinal County in Arizona

This is a list of the National Register of Historic Places listings in Pinal County, Arizona.

This is intended to be a complete list of the properties and districts on the National Register of Historic Places in Pinal County, Arizona, United States. The locations of National Register properties and districts for which the latitude and longitude coordinates are included below, may be seen in a map.

There are 108 properties and districts listed on the National Register in the county, including two National Monuments and one National Historic Landmark. There are also five former listings.

This National Park Service list is complete through NPS recent listings posted September 4, 2026.

== Current listings ==
	Name on the Register	Image	Date listed	Location	City or town	Description
1	Acadia Ranch	Acadia Ranch	February 22, 1984 (#84000765)	825 E. Mt. Lemmon Highway; 32°36′34″N 110°45′54″W	Oracle	Now the Acadia Ranch Museum
2	Adamsville Ruin	Adamsville Ruin	August 25, 1970 (#70000114)	Address Restricted	Florence	Water tanks which once served Adamsville.
3	All Saints' Church	All Saints' Church	May 3, 1984 (#84000768)	705 E. American Avenue; 32°36′35″N 110°45′59″W	Oracle	
4	American Flag Post Office Ranch	American Flag Post Office Ranch	June 20, 1979 (#79000426)	5 miles southeast of Oracle; 32°34′48″N 110°43′14″W	Oracle	Oldest surviving territorial post office building in Arizona.
5	Ramon Arballo House	Ramon Arballo House	August 1, 1986 (#86002623)	515 Park St. 33°02′12″N 111°22′59″W	Florence	
6	Encarnacion Avenenti House	Encarnacion Avenenti House	July 13, 1987 (#87001592)	203 Butte St. 33°01′52″N 111°23′07″W	Florence	Demolished
7	Earl Bayless House	Earl Bayless House	April 16, 1985 (#85000878)	211 N. Cameron; 32°52′31″N 111°44′52″W	Casa Grande	
8	Wilbur O. Bayless/Grasty House	Wilbur O. Bayless/Grasty House	April 16, 1985 (#85000879)	221 N. Cameron; 32°52′32″N 111°44′52″W	Casa Grande	Listed erroneously in NRHP as "Wilbur O. Baylis/Grasty House".
9	Bien/McNatt House	Bien/McNatt House	April 16, 1985 (#85000880)	208A W. 1st St. 32°52′38″N 111°45′19″W	Casa Grande	
10	Dr. George M. and Esther A. Brockway House	Dr. George M. and Esther A. Brockway House	May 26, 2004 (#04000485)	501 S. Central Ave. 33°01′43″N 111°23′25″W	Florence	
11	Building at 121 North Florence Street	Building at 121 North Florence Street	November 20, 2002 (#02000737)	121 N. Florence St. 32°52′35″N 111°45′16″W	Casa Grande	
12	Building at 400 East Third Street	Building at 400 East Third Street	November 20, 2002 (#02000749)	400 E. 3rd St. 32°52′36″N 111°45′00″W	Casa Grande	
13	Butte-Cochran Charcoal Ovens	Butte-Cochran Charcoal Ovens	May 30, 1975 (#75000358)	16 miles east of Florence north of Gila River; 33°06′16″N 111°09′52″W	Florence	
14	Chi'chil Bildagoteel Historic District	Chi'chil Bildagoteel Historic District	March 4, 2016 (#16000002)	Including and surrounding the Oak Flat campground 33°18′29″N 111°03′00″W	Superior	
15	Camp Grant Massacre Site		March 6, 1998 (#98000171)	Address Restricted	Mammoth	
16	Carminatti-Perham House	Carminatti-Perham House	August 1, 1986 (#86002624)	6th and Florence Sts. 33°02′08″N 111°23′01″W	Florence	
17	Casa Grande Dispatch	Casa Grande Dispatch	November 20, 2002 (#02000747)	109 E. 2nd St. 32°52′37″N 111°45′12″W	Casa Grande	
18	Casa Grande Hospital	Casa Grande Hospital	November 20, 2002 (#02000740)	601 N. Cameron Ave. 32°52′44″N 111°44′52″W	Casa Grande	
19	Casa Grande Hotel	Casa Grande Hotel	April 16, 1985 (#85000881)	201 W. Main Ave. 32°52′33″N 111°45′23″W	Casa Grande	
20	Casa Grande National Monument	Casa Grande National Monument	October 15, 1966 (#66000192)	Casa Grande National Monument; 32°59′49″N 111°31′55″W	Coolidge	
21	Casa Grande Stone Church	Casa Grande Stone Church	June 15, 1978 (#78000567)	110 W. Florence Boulevard; 32°52′47″N 111°45′15″W	Casa Grande	Now the Casa Grande Valley Historical Society museum
22	Casa Grande Union High School and Gymnasium	Casa Grande Union High School and Gymnasium	February 3, 1986 (#86000821)	510 E. Florence Boulevard; 32°52′49″N 111°44′51″W	Casa Grande	Now Casa Grande's city hall.
23	Casa Grande Woman's Club Building	Casa Grande Woman's Club Building	March 21, 1979 (#79000425)	407 N. Sacaton St. 32°52′46″N 111°45′18″W	Casa Grande	
24	Central Creditors Association Building	Central Creditors Association Building	April 16, 1985 (#85000882)	118 N. Sacaton; 32°52′38″N 111°45′21″W	Casa Grande	
25	Church of the Nazarene	Church of the Nazarene	November 20, 2002 (#02000750)	305 E. 4th St. 32°52′39″N 111°45′03″W	Casa Grande	
26	Albert Colton and H. H. Freeman House	Albert Colton and H. H. Freeman House	August 1, 1986 (#86002625)	Willow Street and Butte Avenue, southwest corner 33°01′52″N 111°23′23″W	Florence	
27	Coolidge Dam	Coolidge Dam	October 29, 1981 (#81000135)	Southwest of San Carlos; 33°10′26″N 110°31′37″W	San Carlos	(ed. note: does this span 2 counties, should appear in other county list too)
28	Coolidge Woman's Club	Coolidge Woman's Club	October 4, 1990 (#90001524)	240 W. Pinkley Ave. 32°58′44″N 111°31′07″W	Coolidge	
29	William Cox Building	William Cox Building	September 3, 1999 (#99001068)	501 N. Marshall St. 32°52′43″N 111°45′06″W	Casa Grande	
30	Cruz Trading Post	Cruz Trading Post	April 16, 1985 (#85000883)	200 W. Main St. 32°52′35″N 111°45′20″W	Casa Grande	Commercial building built around 1888, renovated in Pueblo Revival style around 1937.
31	Judge William T. Day House	Judge William T. Day House	July 25, 1985 (#85001624)	306 W. 1st St. 32°52′40″N 111°45′22″W	Casa Grande	
32	Devil's Canyon Bridge	Devil's Canyon Bridge	September 30, 1988 (#88001681)	Abandoned U.S. Route 60 over Devil's Canyon; 33°19′40″N 111°01′56″W	Superior	Filled spandrel arch bridge
33	James S. Melquides E. Douglass House	James S. Melquides E. Douglass House	May 27, 2004 (#04000486)	850 S. Park St. 33°01′27″N 111°23′00″W	Florence	
34	Evergreen Addition Historic District	Evergreen Addition Historic District	January 22, 2009 (#08001346)	Generally bounded by McMurray Blvd., Gilbert Ave., Florence Blvd., and Casa Grande Ave. 32°52′59″N 111°44′43″W	Casa Grande	
35	First Baptist Church	First Baptist Church	November 20, 2002 (#02000751)	218 E. 8th St. 32°52′51″N 111°45′04″W	Casa Grande	
36	First Florence Courthouse	First Florence Courthouse	July 30, 1974 (#74000461)	5th and Main Sts. 33°02′32″N 111°23′40″W	Florence	1878 courthouse, now preserved within McFarland State Historic Park.
37	First Presbyterian Church of Florence	First Presbyterian Church of Florence	June 10, 1994 (#94000573)	225 E. Butte Ave. 33°01′52″N 111°23′06″W	Florence	
38	Florence Townsite Historic District	Florence Townsite Historic District	October 26, 1982 (#82001623)	Roughly bounded by 3rd and Florence Sts., Butte and Central Aves., and Chase/Ruggles Ditch; 33°02′01″N 111°23′13″W	Florence	Main Street
39	Florence Union High School	Florence Union High School	June 22, 1987 (#87001306)	1000 S. Main St. 33°01′21″N 111°23′16″W	Florence	
40	Thomas Fulbright House	Thomas Fulbright House	October 4, 1996 (#96001055)	75 S. Matilda St. 33°01′50″N 111°23′02″W	Florence	
41	Grewe Site		May 30, 2001 (#01000565)	Address Restricted	Coolidge	
42	Ha-ak Va-ak Intaglio Site		September 6, 1979 (#79000427)	Address Restricted	Sacaton	
43	Harvey-Niemeyer House	Harvey-Niemeyer House	August 1, 1986 (#86002627)	250 S. Main St. 33°01′45″N 111°23′13″W	Florence	Address was 1613 Main St.
44	C. D. Henry House	C. D. Henry House	August 1, 1986 (#86002628)	144 S. Willow St. 33°01′49″N 111°23′20″W	Florence	Address was 1520 Willow St.
45	Hieroglyphic Canyon Site	Hieroglyphic Canyon Site	April 11, 1994 (#94000269)	Address Restricted	Apache Junction vicinity	
46	Hohokam-Pima National Monument	Hohokam-Pima National Monument	July 19, 1974 (#74002221)	20 miles (30 km) south of Phoenix on Interstate 10; 33°11′12″N 111°55′00″W	Gila River Indian Reservation	
47	House at 222 West Ninth St.	House at 222 West Ninth St.	November 20, 2002 (#02000743)	222 W. 9th St. 32°52′55″N 111°45′21″W	Casa Grande	
48	House at 317 East Eighth Street	House at 317 East Eighth Street	November 20, 2002 (#02000753)	317 E. 8th St. 32°52′49″N 111°45′00″W	Casa Grande	
49	House at 320 West Eighth Street	House at 320 West Eighth Street	November 20, 2002 (#02000745)	320 W. 8th St. 32°52′51″N 111°45′26″W	Casa Grande	
50	House at 323 West Eighth St.	House at 323 West Eighth St.	November 20, 2002 (#02000744)	323 W. 8th St. 32°52′49″N 111°45′26″W	Casa Grande	
51	House at 59 North Brown Avenue	House at 59 North Brown Avenue	November 20, 2002 (#02000742)	59 N. Brown Ave. 32°52′21″N 111°44′44″W	Casa Grande	
52	House at 736 North Center Avenue	House at 736 North Center Avenue	November 20, 2002 (#02000738)	736 N. Center Ave. 32°52′49″N 111°45′11″W	Casa Grande	
53	House at North Lehmberg Avenue	House at North Lehmberg Avenue	November 20, 2002 (#02000735)	1105 N. Lehmberg Ave. 32°53′08″N 111°44′37″W	Casa Grande	
54	Dr. George Huffman House	Dr. George Huffman House	August 1, 1986 (#86002629)	471 E. Butte Avenue; 33°01′52″N 111°22′58″W	Florence	
55	Johnson's Grocery Store	Johnson's Grocery Store	April 16, 1985 (#85000885)	301 N. Picacho; 32°52′36″N 111°45′05″W	Casa Grande	
56	Kannally Ranch	Kannally Ranch	March 28, 1996 (#96000307)	Mt. Lemmon Highway east of Oracle; 32°36′34″N 110°43′59″W	Oracle	
57	Kelvin Bridge	Kelvin Bridge	September 30, 1988 (#88001646)	Florence-Kelvin Highway over the Gila River; 33°06′10″N 110°58′26″W	Kelvin	
58	V.W. Kilcrease Building	V.W. Kilcrease Building	November 20, 2002 (#02000754)	139 W. 1st St. 32°52′36″N 111°45′18″W	Casa Grande	
59	Henry and Anna Kochsmeier House	Henry and Anna Kochsmeier House	November 20, 2002 (#02000746)	403 W. 2nd Ave. 32°52′33″N 111°45′34″W	Casa Grande	
60	Gus Kratzka House	Gus Kratzka House	April 16, 1985 (#85000886)	319 W. 3rd Street; 32°52′45″N 111°45′20″W	Casa Grande	Now the Casa Grande Art Museum
61	La Casa del High Jinks	La Casa del High Jinks	October 16, 1996 (#96001056)	High Jinks Rd., 8 miles southeast of Oracle and 2.5 miles west of Mt. Lemmon Rd. 32°34′17″N 110°44′18″W	Oracle	
62	Laundry Building	Laundry Building	April 16, 1985 (#85000887)	Rear of 309 W. 8th 32°52′49″N 111°45′22″W	Casa Grande	Apparently no longer extant
63	Dr. H. B. Lehmberg House	Dr. H. B. Lehmberg House	April 16, 1985 (#85000888)	929 N. Lehmberg; 32°52′59″N 111°44′37″W	Casa Grande	
64	Lincoln Hospital	Lincoln Hospital	November 20, 2002 (#02000741)	112 N. Brown Ave. 32°52′27″N 111°44′41″W	Casa Grande	
65	Inez and Davis Littlefield Bea House	Inez and Davis Littlefield Bea House	August 1, 1986 (#86002630)	1913 Elizabeth St. 33°01′38″N 111°23′10″W	Florence	renumbered to 455 Elizabeth St.
66	Andronico Lorona Second House	Andronico Lorona Second House	August 1, 1986 (#86002631)	324 Silver St. 33°02′05″N 111°22′54″W	Florence	
67	Los Robles Archeological District		May 11, 1989 (#89000337)	Address Restricted	Red Rock	
68	Magma Hotel	Magma Hotel	August 19, 1994 (#94000981)	100-130 Main St. 33°17′38″N 111°05′45″W	Superior	The original Magma Hotel was built in 1912 and is located at 100 Main Street. An adobe addition was built in 1916. In 1923, a two story brick addition labelled "MacPherson's Hotel Magma" (pictured) was built at 130 Main Street.
69	Mandell and Meyer Building	Mandell and Meyer Building	November 20, 2002 (#02000736)	211 N. Florence St. 32°52′37″N 111°45′15″W	Casa Grande	
70	Manjarres House	Manjarres House	August 6, 1987 (#87001591)	351 Silver St. 33°02′05″N 111°22′53″W	Florence	
71	McClellan Wash Archeological District		May 11, 1989 (#89000336)	Address Restricted	Picacho	
72	James and Mary McGee House		May 27, 2004 (#04000487)	330 E. Butte Ave. 33°01′54″N 111°22′58″W	Florence	Demolished
73	Meehan/Gaar House	Meehan/Gaar House	April 16, 1985 (#85000890)	200 W. 1st St. 32°52′38″N 111°45′19″W	Casa Grande	
74	Mineral Creek Bridge		September 30, 1988 (#88001648)	Old U.S. Route 77 over Mineral Creek; 33°07′20″N 110°58′32″W	Kelvin	
75	Paramount Theatre	Paramount Theatre	September 3, 1999 (#99001067)	420 N. Florence St. 32°52′42″N 111°45′09″W	Casa Grande	
76	Period Revival House	Period Revival House	July 25, 1985 (#85001623)	905 N. Lehmberg; 32°52′55″N 111°44′37″W	Casa Grande	
77	Picacho Pass Skirmish Site-Overland Mail Co. Stage Station at Picacho Pass	Picacho Pass Skirmish Site-Overland Mail Co. Stage Station at Picacho Pass	November 22, 2002 (#02001384)	1 mile northwest of Interchange #219 on Interstate 10; 32°40′10″N 111°24′53″W	Picacho	The site is near Picacho Peak State Park where a reenactment takes place.
78	Adrian Pierson House	Adrian Pierson House	July 13, 1987 (#87001593)	E. 6th St. and U.S. Route 79; 33°02′08″N 111°22′42″W	Florence	Image is not Adrian Pierson House, Adrian Pierson House is across the street.
79	Second Pinal County Courthouse	Second Pinal County Courthouse	August 2, 1978 (#78000568)	Pinal and 12th Sts. 33°01′56″N 111°23′06″W	Florence	
80	Pioneer Market	Pioneer Market	April 16, 1985 (#85000919)	119 N. Florence St. 32°52′35″N 111°45′16″W	Casa Grande	
81	Prettyman's Meat Market and Grocery/Brigg's Jeweler	Prettyman's Meat Market and Grocery/Brigg's Jeweler	April 16, 1985 (#85000891)	110 W. Main St. 32°52′34″N 111°45′18″W	Casa Grande	
82	W. Y. Price House	W. Y. Price House	August 1, 1986 (#86002632)	1612 Willow St. 33°01′48″N 111°23′20″W	Florence	
83	Queen Creek Bridge	Queen Creek Bridge	September 30, 1988 (#88001679)	Abandoned U.S. Route 60 over Upper Queen Creek Canyon; 33°17′47″N 111°05′19″W	Superior	
84	Queen Creek Bridge	Queen Creek Bridge	September 30, 1988 (#88001643)	Old Florence Highway over Queen Creek; 33°17′16″N 111°19′42″W	Florence Junction	
85	Rancho Linda Vista	Rancho Linda Vista	September 9, 1999 (#99001099)	1955 W. Linda Vista Rd. 32°36′12″N 110°47′41″W	Oracle	
86	Rancho Solano		September 7, 1995 (#95001079)	34145 S. Golder Dam Rd. 32°34′01″N 110°50′52″W	Catalina	
87	Randolph Community Historic District		March 18, 2024 (#100010053)	Generally bounded by Highway 287, East Randolph Rd., East Kleck Rd., and Union Pacific Railroad Right-of-Way; 32°54′57″N 111°30′50″W	Coolidge	
88	S.S. Blinky Jr. Building	S.S. Blinky Jr. Building	November 20, 2002 (#02000748)	465 W. Gila Bend Highway; 32°52′47″N 111°45′31″W	Casa Grande	
89	Sacaton Dam Bridge	Sacaton Dam Bridge	September 30, 1988 (#88001621)	Gila River Indian Reservation Rd. 33°05′19″N 111°41′11″W	Sacaton	
90	Saint Anthony's Church and Rectory	Saint Anthony's Church and Rectory	April 16, 1985 (#85000892)	215 N. Picacho; 32°52′33″N 111°45′09″W	Casa Grande	
91	San Tan Canal Bridge	San Tan Canal Bridge	September 30, 1988 (#88001622)	Gila River Indian Reservation Rd. 33°05′30″N 111°41′11″W	Sacaton	
92	Shonessy Building/Don Chun Wo Store	Shonessy Building/Don Chun Wo Store	April 16, 1985 (#85000893)	121 W. Main Ave. 32°52′32″N 111°45′19″W	Casa Grande	Apparently no longer extant.
93	Shonessy House	Shonessy House	April 16, 1985 (#85000894)	115 W. Main Ave. 32°52′32″N 111°45′22″W	Casa Grande	
94	Snaketown National Historic Landmark	Snaketown National Historic Landmark	October 15, 1966 (#07001462)	Chandler vicinity 33°10′59″N 111°55′28″W	Chandler	
95	Stone Bungalow	Stone Bungalow	April 16, 1985 (#85000895)	515 E. 3rd St. 32°52′32″N 111°44′57″W	Casa Grande	
96	Stone Warehouse	Stone Warehouse	April 16, 1985 (#85000896)	119 Florence St. in rear 32°52′35″N 111°45′17″W	Casa Grande	
97	Benjamin Templeton House	Benjamin Templeton House	November 20, 2002 (#02000739)	923 N. Center Ave. 32°52′57″N 111°45′14″W	Casa Grande	
98	Boyce Thompson Southwestern Arboretum	Boyce Thompson Southwestern Arboretum	March 26, 1976 (#76000381)	2 miles (3.2 km) west of Superior on U.S. Route 60; also 38645 East Arboretum Way; 33°16′21″N 111°09′27″W	Superior	A boundary increase was approved July 8, 2025.
99	Truman-Randall House	Truman-Randall House	July 13, 1987 (#87001594)	550 S. Main St. 33°01′37″N 111°23′14″W	Florence	Address was 2010 S. Main St.
100	Valley National Bank	Valley National Bank	November 20, 2002 (#02000733)	221 N. Florence St. 32°52′38″N 111°45′14″W	Casa Grande	
101	Vasquez House	Vasquez House	April 16, 1985 (#85000897)	114 E. Florence Boulevard; 32°52′47″N 111°45′09″W	Casa Grande	
102	Verdugo Homestead Historic District		August 30, 2001 (#01000904)	Address Restricted	Randolph	
103	Ward's Variety Store	Ward's Variety Store	April 16, 1985 (#85000898)	112 N. Sacaton; 32°52′38″N 111°45′22″W	Casa Grande	
104	P. C. Warner First House		August 1, 1986 (#86002633)	310 3rd St. 33°02′13″N 111°23′05″W	Florence	Demolished
105	White House	White House	April 16, 1985 (#85000899)	901 N. Morrison; 32°52′54″N 111°44′48″W	Casa Grande	
106	Walter Wilbur House	Walter Wilbur House	November 20, 2002 (#02000752)	904 E. 8th St. 32°52′51″N 111°44′35″W	Casa Grande	
107	C. J. (Blinky) Wilson House	C. J. (Blinky) Wilson House	April 16, 1985 (#85000900)	223 W. 10th 32°52′57″N 111°45′21″W	Casa Grande	
108	Winkelman Bridge	Winkelman Bridge	September 30, 1988 (#88001649)	Old State Route 77 over the Gila River; 32°59′05″N 110°46′20″W	Winkelman	

== Former listings ==
	Name on the Register	Image	Date listed	Date removed	Location	City or town	Description
1	C.H. Cook Memorial Church	C.H. Cook Memorial Church	August 28, 1975 (#75000359)	May 13, 2019	Church St. 33°04′44″N 111°44′28″W	Sacaton	Destroyed by fire March 2019
2	Ed and Lottie Devine House		August 1, 1986 (#86002626)	December 6, 1996	1200 Central St. 32°59′06″N 110°46′18″W	Winkelman	
3	Fisher Memorial Home	Fisher Memorial Home	April 16, 1985 (#85000884)	January 31, 2019	300 E. 8th St. 32°52′51″N 111°45′03″W	Casa Grande	Destroyed by fire in April 2017
4	John C. Loss House		April 16, 1985 (#85000889)	October 2, 1992	107 W. Main Ave.	Casa Grande	
5	Southern Pacific Railroad Depot	Southern Pacific Railroad Depot	November 20, 2002 (#02000734)	January 31, 2019	201 W. Main St. 32°52′34″N 111°45′19″W	Casa Grande	Depot was destroyed by fire in 2009.

== See also ==
- List of National Historic Landmarks in Arizona
- National Register of Historic Places listings in Arizona
