= List of things named after Calvin Coolidge =

This is a list of things named after Calvin Coolidge, the 30th President of the United States. President Coolidge was himself named after his father, John Calvin Coolidge Sr., and his grandfather, Calvin Galusha Coolidge. As Coolidge was a somewhat common name in the United States in the 19th century, there are many places and things named "Coolidge" in the US not named for the president; those things do not appear on this list.

== Places ==
=== Historic places significant to the life of Calvin Coolidge ===
- Coolidge Homestead, Plymouth Notch, Vermont
- Calvin Coolidge House, Northampton, Massachusetts
- Calvin Coolidge Presidential Library and Museum, Northampton, Massachusetts

=== Parks and preserves ===
- Calvin Coolidge State Forest, Vermont
  - Coolidge State Park, Vermont, within the forest

=== Natural features ===
- Mount Coolidge, a summit in Custer County, South Dakota

=== Infrastructure ===
- Calvin Coolidge Bridge, Northampton, Massachusetts
- Coolidge Dam, Arizona
- Coolidge Municipal Airport, in Coolidge, Arizona
- Coolidge station, a former Amtrak rail station in Coolidge, Arizona

=== Municipalities ===
- Coolidge, Arizona, a town near Coolidge Dam
- Coolidge, Montana, a ghost town and former mining site, active circa 1914-50

=== Schools and colleges ===
- Calvin Coolidge School, a public elementary school in Binghamton, New York
- Calvin Coolidge Elementary School, a public elementary school in San Gabriel, California
- Calvin Coolidge Elementary School, Shrewsbury, Massachusetts
- Calvin Coolidge Elementary School, Wyckoff, New Jersey
- Calvin Coolidge High School, the fictitious New York City high school that was the setting for Bel Kaufman's 1964 novel Up the Down Staircase
- Calvin Coolidge School, in Moline, Illinois
- Calvin Coolidge Middle School, in Peoria, Illinois
- Coolidge Unified School District, in Coolidge, Arizona
  - Coolidge High School, in the school district
- Calvin Coolidge Senior High School, a school in Washington, D.C.
- Calvin Coolidge College, a former higher education institution in Boston, Massachusetts, closed in 1969.

=== Buildings and rooms ===
- Coolidge Woman's Club, a historic building in Coolidge, Arizona
- Coolidge Auditorium, a room in the Thomas Jefferson Building of the US Library of Congress.
- Calvin Coolidge Library at Vermont State University Castleton, Vermont
- Coolidge Hall, a dormitory at the University of Massachusetts Amherst

== Literary works ==
- The Man Who Knew Coolidge, a 1928 novel by Sinclair Lewis
- The Autobiography of Calvin Coolidge, 1929
- The Calvin Coolidge Home for Dead Comedians, a 1988 novella by Bradley Denton
- Seeing Calvin Coolidge in a Dream, a 1996 novel by John Derbyshire

== Other ==
- SS President Coolidge, an ocean liner that sailed from 1931 to 1942
- Coolidge effect, a sexual behavior observed in some animals, apparently named for a joke involving Calvin Coolidge

== See also ==
- Presidency of Calvin Coolidge
