= Queen Creek Bridge =

Queen Creek Bridge may refer to:

- Old Queen Creek Bridge, listed on the National Register of Historic Places in Pinal County, Arizona
- Queen Creek Bridge (Florence Junction, Arizona), listed on the National Register of Historic Places in Pinal County, Arizona
- Queen Creek Viaduct, which carries U.S. Route 60 over Queen Creek just outside of Superior, Arizona.
