= Fisher Memorial Home =

Historic building in Casa Grande, Arizona, U.S.

- Formerly listed on the U.S. National Register of Historic Places
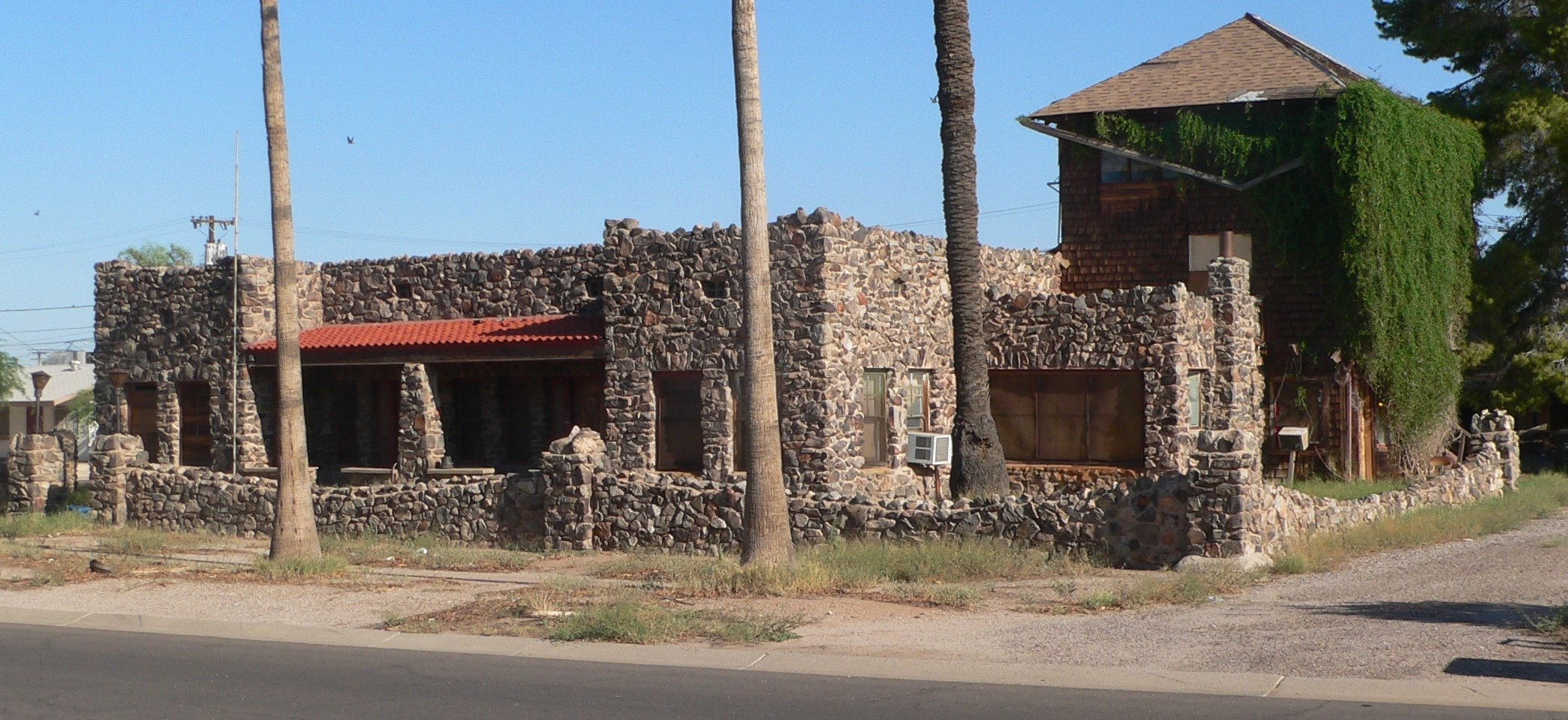
- The home's exterior in 2013

- Location within Arizona Location within the United States
- Location: 300 E. 8th Street; Casa Grande, Arizona
- Coordinates: 32.8809°N 111.7507°W
- NRHP reference No.: 85000834

Significant dates
- Added to NRHP: April 16, 1985
- Removed from NRHP: January 31, 2019

Fisher Memorial Home was an historic structure located at 300 E. 8th Street in Casa Grande, Arizona. The building was included on the National Register of Historic Places, before being removed on January 31, 2019, having been destroyed by fire in April 2017.

== See also ==
- List of historic properties in Casa Grande, Arizona
- National Register of Historic Places listings in Pinal County, Arizona
