= Winkelman Bridge =

- U.S. National Register of Historic Places
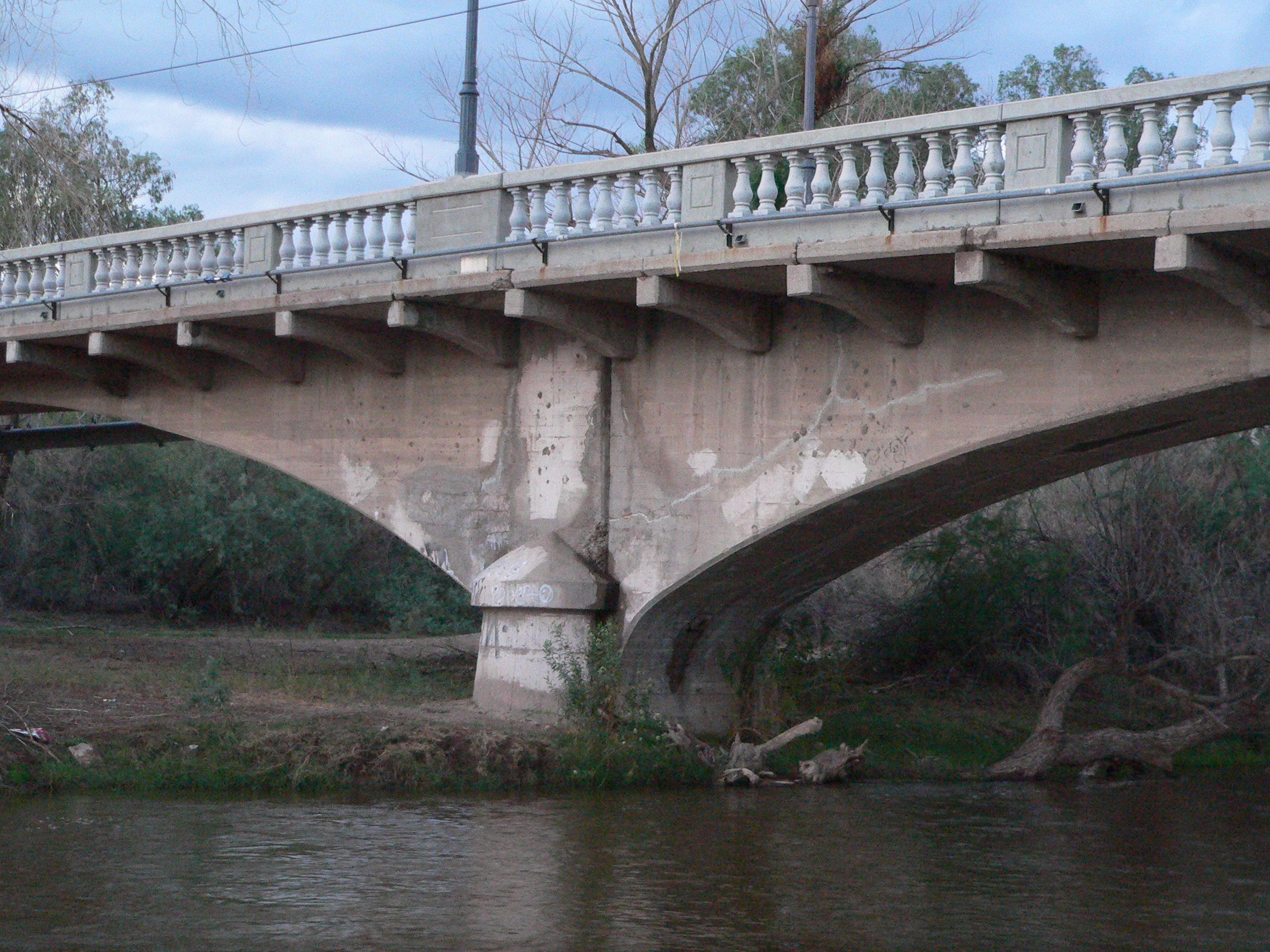

- Location within Arizona Location within the United States
- Location: Old AZ 77 over the Gila River, Winkelman, Arizona
- Coordinates: 32°59′6″N 110°46′18″W
- Area: 0.2 acres (0.081 ha)
- Built: 1916
- Architectural style: Concrete Luten arch
- MPS: Vehicular Bridges in Arizona MPS
- NRHP reference No.: 88001649
- Added to NRHP: September 30, 1988

The Winkelman Bridge is a historic bridge over the Gila River in Winkelman, Arizona, U.S.. It was built in 1916. It has been listed on the National Register of Historic Places since September 30, 1988.
