= Coolidge Senior High School (Washington, D.C.) =

Calvin Coolidge High School

Location
- 6315 Fifth Street NW; Washington, D.C. 20011; United States; 38°58′02″N 77°01′09″W

Information
- School type: Public high school
- Motto: Enter to Learn, Exit to Serve
- Established: September 23, 1940; 85 years ago
- Status: Open
- School board: District of Columbia State Board of Education
- School district: District of Columbia Public Schools
- NCES District ID: 1100030
- School code: DC-001-455
- CEEB code: 090030
- NCES School ID: 110003000081
- Principal: Semanthe Bright
- Faculty: 81.40 (on an FTE basis)
- Grades: 9 to 12
- Enrollment: 561 (2024–2025)
  - Grade 9: 259
  - Grade 10: 293
  - Grade 11: 273
  - Grade 12: 204
- Student to teacher ratio: 12.64
- Campus type: Urban
- Colors: Gray and orange
- Nickname: Colts
- USNWR ranking: 13,394–17,857
- Feeder schools: LaSalle-Backus Education Campus, Takoma Education Campus, and Whittier Education Campus
- Website: www.coolidgeshs.org
- Calvin Coolidge High School
- U.S. National Register of Historic Places
- D.C. Inventory of Historic Sites
- Location within the District of Columbia
- Built: 1940
- Architect: Nathan C. Wyeth
- Architectural style: Georgian Revival
- MPS: Public School Buildings of Washington, DC MPS
- NRHP reference No.: 100007616

Significant dates
- Added to NRHP: April 12, 2022
- Designated DCIHS: September 23, 2021

Calvin Coolidge High School is a public high school of the District of Columbia Public Schools system located in the Takoma neighborhood in the Northwest quadrant of Washington, D.C. Its campus is listed on the National Register of Historic Places.

== History ==
To relieve crowding at Roosevelt High School, Superintendent Frank W. Ballou in 1936 proposed building a new high school for students living in Manor Park and Takoma Park. Dr. Ballou suggested that the new high school should be built at Fifth and Sheridan streets NW, on property that the District of Columbia had purchased five years earlier and across the street from Whittier School, which had been built in 1925.

Temporarily named Northern Senior High School, the building of the school was supported by many Takoma Park, Manor Park, Chillum Heights, and Sixteenth Street Heights residents and North Dakota Senator Lynn Frazier. The finance committee of the Board of Education approved the plan soon after Dr. Ballou's recommendation. The House of Representatives originally appropriated $450,000 for the building of the school, but a Senate subcommittee reduced the appropriation to $350,000, despite protests by Senator Frazier.

In 1937, the question of a permanent name for the school was raised. The Manor Park Citizens Association and the Brightwood Citizens Association wanted to name the school for Calvin Coolidge, the only former president without a school named after him. Other residents favored using the name Northern High School because it would fit in with existing schools named Eastern, Western, and Central. Those favoring Coolidge won out.

The Board of Education planned to build a two-story brick school with a flat roof. Local citizens associations said the planned school would look like a factory. They preferred a colonial style similar to that of nearby Roosevelt High School. The Manor Park Citizens Association held firm, and the plans were modified to include three stories, a pitched roof, and a cupola. Architect Nathan C. Wyeth changed the design to a modern Georgian style.

Jeffress-Dryer Inc. won the bid to build the school, and construction began in 1938. The original plans called for one boys' gymnasium and one girls' gymnasium. Because two gymnasiums could not be afforded with the funds appropriated by Congress, the girls' gymnasium was eliminated from the plans. After the Takoma Park Citizens Association petitioned Congress, the District's Board of Commissioners agreed to appropriate an additional $16,000 in order to build the girls' gymnasium. Construction was completed in February 1940, at a cost of $1,500,000.

Coolidge opened its doors on September 23, 1940. Its first principal was Thomas J. Holmes, previously the assistant principal of Eastern High School. Holmes did not end up completing his first year as principal, as he took a leave of absence to serve as an officer at Fort Meade in April 1941. During its first school year, Coolidge had 31 teachers, 750 students enrolled, and a capacity of 1,801.

The school has an adjacent track and football field, likely constructed around the same time as the original school building.

== Admissions ==
Takoma is in the school's attendance boundary.

=== Demographics ===
Coolidge High School had 1,029 students enrolled during the 2024–2025 school year. Of these students, 55 percent were black, 43 percent were Hispanic/Latino, 1 percent were white, and 1 percent were multiple races.

== Curriculum ==
Coolidge High School offers Advanced Placement courses in science, English, math, and history. It has an art room, a media center, a computer lab, and a science lab.

According to the 2024–2025 District of Columbia's Comprehensive Assessment System, 7% of students met or exceeded math standards, and 23% of students met or exceeded English language arts standards. In 2010, the school's graduation rate was 95%, and 47% of graduating students registered at a college or university in the following fall semester.

== Extracurricular activities ==
=== Athletics ===
The school's athletic teams are named the Colts. Coolidge was the first high school in the District to require physical education classes five period per week. Because the school was so new, it could not organize any athletic teams in time for the 1939–1940 school year, but it did have teams organized for the 1940–1941 school year. In December 1940, The Colts' first basketball game was played against Woodward Prep. Because the delivery of its basketball hoops was delayed, the game was played at a local Y.M.C.A. Coached by the former head coach of Anacostia High School, Julian Colangelo, Coolidge beat Woodward Prep, 42 to 19. Coolidge also won its second-ever basketball game, winning an away game against Briarley Military Academy by a score of 25 to 17. Coolidge's third basketball game was the first game played in its own gymnasium; it was a 19-to-12 win against Anacostia High School.

The Colts first baseball team played its first game in April 1941, playing against Briarley Military Academy. Coolidge lost the game 13 to 7 after committing six errors and walking nine batters.

Coolidge's football team, coached by Sherman Rees and Gil Roberts, began playing in September 1941. Coolidge lost its first game 27 to 0 against John Handley High School. Coolidge played its second football game, and its first home game, against National Training School. Coolidge won the game 7 to 6.

The 1946–1947 school year was particularly successful at Coolidge, with the school's baseball, basketball, football, golf, rifle, and archery teams all bringing in District championships that year.

After years without a stadium, the District's Board of Education and the District's Board of Commissioners approved construction of a stadium behind the school at Third and Sheridan streets in 1945. The land was owned by the federal government. Coolidge did not want to build a stadium on federally owned land so it would not have to share ticket revenue with the federal government. The federal government ended up giving the land to the District Board of Education, allowing Coolidge to continue plans for a 10,000-seat stadium, football and baseball field, and a quarter-mile track. President Harry Truman cut the stadium's construction from the District's 1952 budget in order to keep the District's budget balanced. The District's Board of Commissioners approved a 1955 budget that included Coolidge's stadium. Congress ended up appropriating funds for the stadium's construction in the 1955 budget.

In 2007, Coolidge opened its new football field, including a digital scoreboard, a press box, and a new public-address system.

In 2010, Coolidge hired Natalie Randolph as its football coach, making her the only female head football coach in the nation. Randolph had previously played wide receiver for the D.C. Divas women's professional football team. Randolph also teaches environmental sciences.

== See also ==
- List of things named after Calvin Coolidge
