= Picacho Reservoir =

Reservoir in Pinal County, Arizona, US

- Location within Arizona
- Location: Pinal County, Arizona, United States
- Coordinates: 32°50′04″N 111°29′22″W
- Type: reservoir
- Basin countries: United States
- Surface area: 50 acres (20 ha)
- Average depth: 10 ft (3.0 m)
- Surface elevation: 1,500 ft (460 m)

Picacho Reservoir is just 11 miles (18 km) south of Coolidge in central Arizona, United States. The reservoir was built in the 1920s as part of the San Carlos Irrigation Project. The reservoir's original purpose was water storage and flow regulation for the Florence-Casa Grande and Casa Grande Canals. The lake's design capacity was 24,500 acre-feet (30,200,000 m^{3}) of water, with a surface area of over 2 square miles (5.2 km^{2}). Over the years, siltation and vegetation have reduced the capacity and surface area, so that much of the reservoir is a shallow marsh with extensive stands of cattails and rushes. Water level is highly variable, and the lake is completely dry in some years.

== Fish species ==
- Largemouth Bass
- Crappie
- Sunfish
- Catfish (Channel)
- Tilapia
- Carp
- Bullfrogs
