= Coolidge Unified School District =

School district in Arizona, United States

Address
- 450 North Arizona Boulevard Coolidge, Arizona, 85128; United States

District information
- Type: Public
- Grades: PreK–12
- NCES District ID: 0402320

Students and staff
- Students: 2,110
- Teachers: 111.01
- Staff: 151.86
- Student–teacher ratio: 19.01

Other information
- Website: www.coolidgeschools.org

The Coolidge Unified School District #21 serves Coolidge, Arizona and outlying areas. It has six schools: Heartland Ranch and West elementary schools; Coolidge Junior High School; Coolidge Alternative Program (CAP); Coolidge Virtual Academy (CVA); and Coolidge High School.
