= First Baptist Church (Casa Grande, Arizona) =

Historic church in Arizona, United States

- U.S. National Register of Historic Places
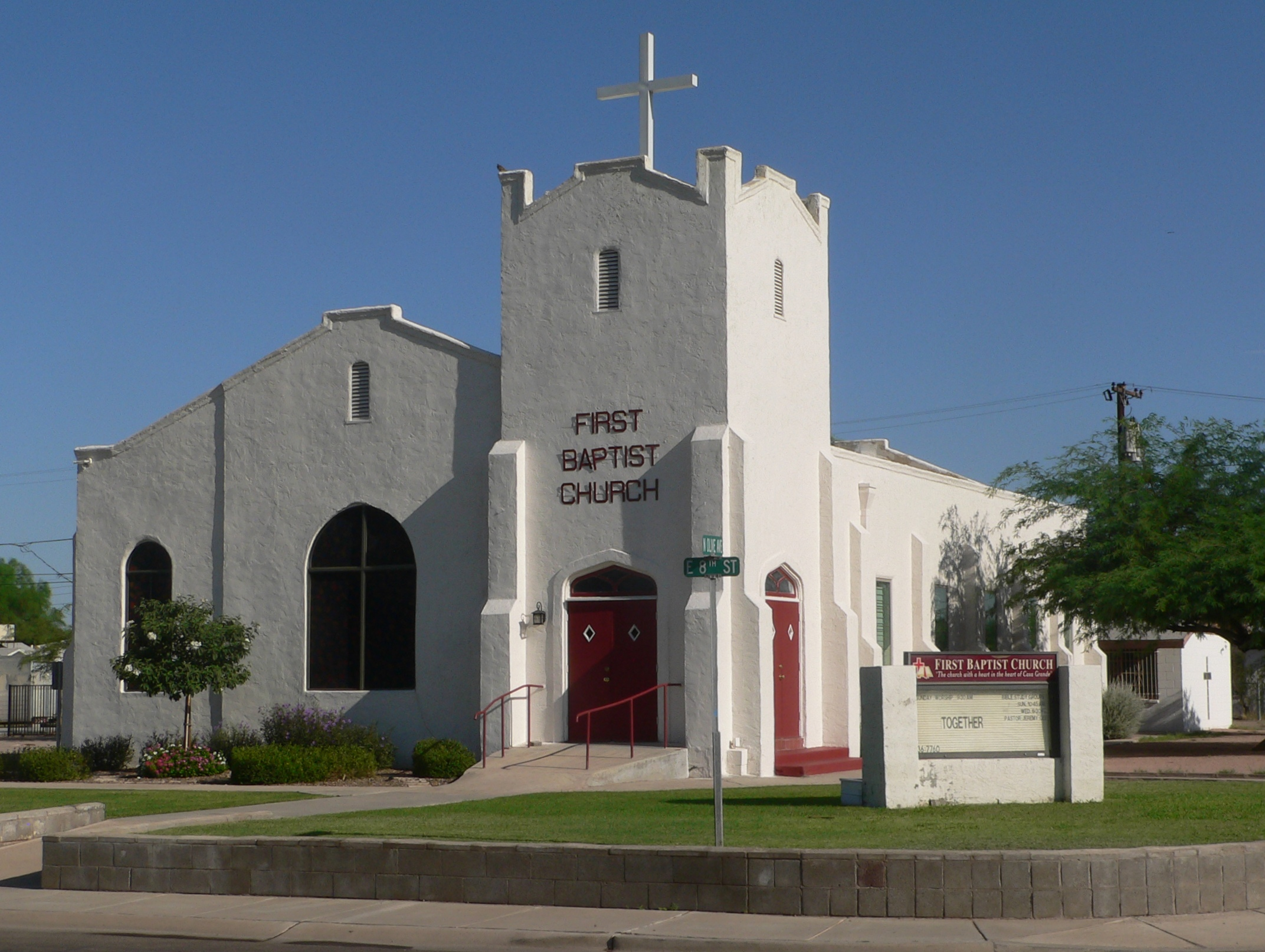

- Location within Arizona Location within the United States
- Location: 218 E. Eighth St., Casa Grande, Arizona
- Coordinates: 32°52′51.2″N 111°45′4.4″W
- Area: less than one acre
- Built: 1938
- Architectural style: Mission/spanish Revival
- MPS: Casa Grande, Arizona MPS
- NRHP reference No.: 02000751
- Added to NRHP: November 20, 2002

First Baptist Church is a Conservative Baptist church at 218 E. Eighth Street, at the northwest corner of intersection with N. Olive, in Casa Grande, Arizona.

The church was founded in 1920. Its building constructed in 1938 was added to the National Register of Historic Places in 2002. The listing included two contributing buildings.

It was deemed significant "as a good example of the Mission/Spanish Colonial Revival style.... Indicative of the Mission style is the simplicity of form, the arched windows that punctuate the facade, and the minimal use of surface ornamentation. This property, like many properties that utilized revival styles during the era of this building's construction, borrows elements of other revival styles such as Gothic, Tudor and Romanesque. This property also has good integrity, as the only alteration appears to be the addition of solid material in place of glazing in the main arched window light on the front facade." The building is also significant one of only three public buildings in a surveyed area that is of wood-frame construction.

== See also ==
- List of historic properties in Casa Grande, Arizona
