= Coolidge Woman's Club =

- U.S. National Register of Historic Places
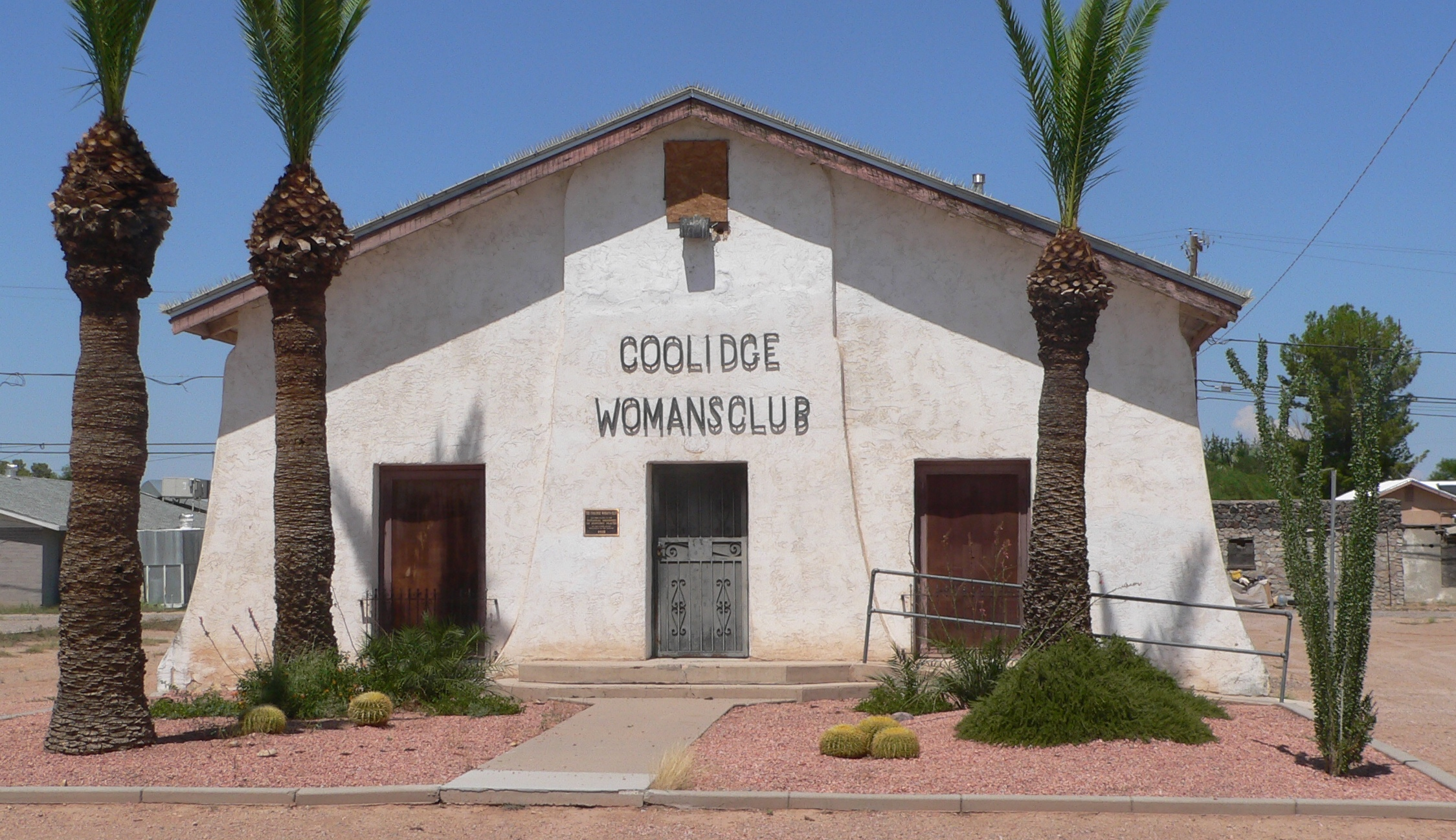

- Location within Arizona
- Location: 240 W. Pinkley Ave., Coolidge, Arizona
- Coordinates: 32°58′44″N 111°31′07″W
- Area: less than one acre
- Built: 1928
- Architect: C. Lewis Kelley
- Architectural style: Mission/spanish Revival
- NRHP reference No.: 90001524
- Added to NRHP: October 4, 1990

The Coolidge Woman's Club, at 240 W. Pinkley Ave. in Coolidge, Arizona, was built in 1928. It was listed on the National Register of Historic Places in 1990.

It is a 67 by 34 feet (20 m × 10 m) adobe building, designed by Phoenix architect C. Lewis Kelley.

It was the first building in Coolidge built for "public activities", and it "housed many civic groups and soon became the social center of the community."
