= Building at 400 East Third Street =

- U.S. National Register of Historic Places
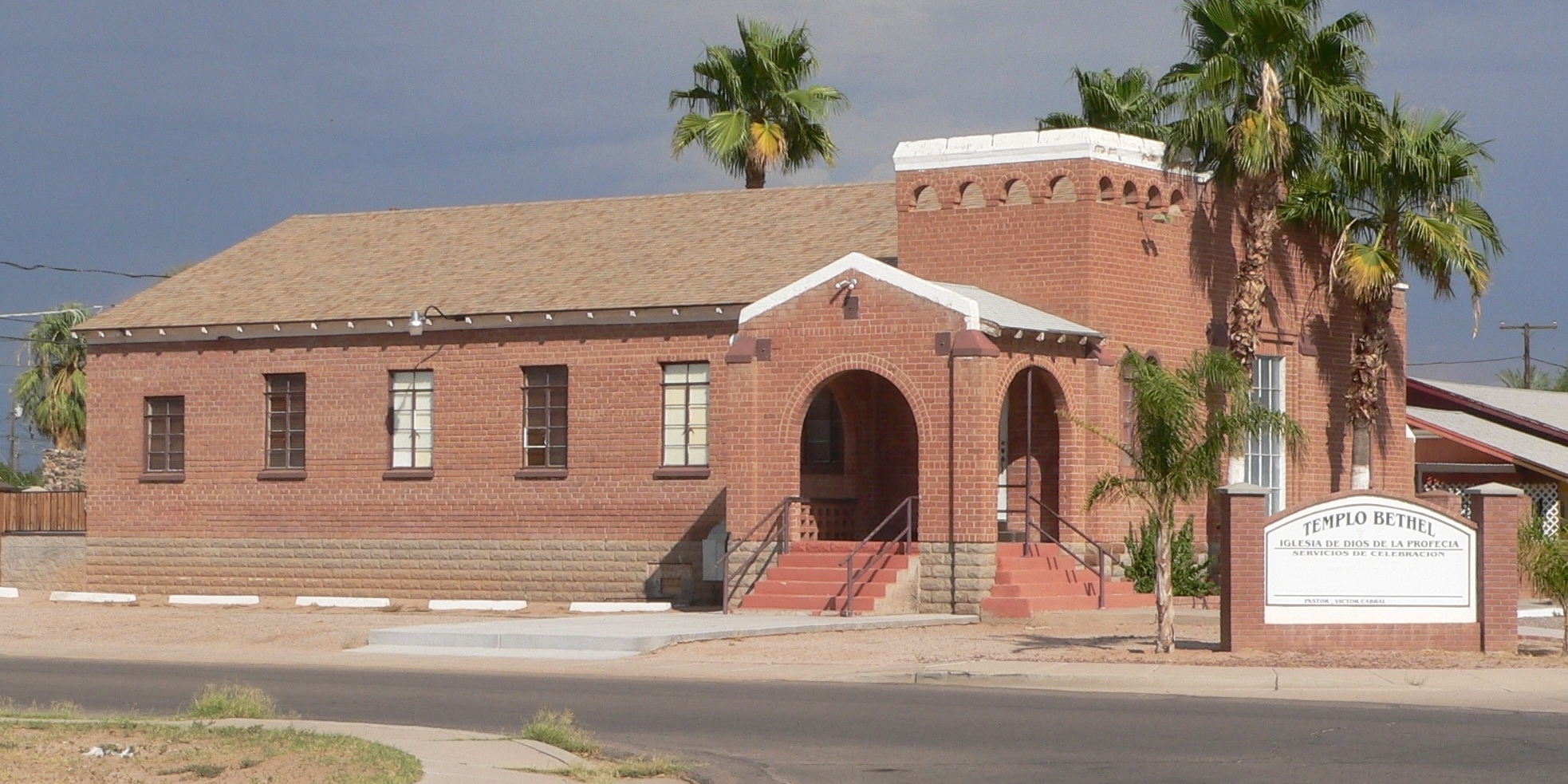
- Building in 2013

- Location within Arizona
- Location: 400 E. Third St., Casa Grande, Arizona
- Coordinates: 32.876566°N 111.750041°W
- Area: less than one acre
- Built: 1943
- Architectural style: Late 19th and 20th Century Revivals
- MPS: Casa Grande, Arizona MPS
- NRHP reference No.: 02000749
- Added to NRHP: November 20, 2002

The Building at 400 East Third Street, in Casa Grande, Arizona, was listed on the National Register of Historic Places in 2002. It was built around 1950 in a simplified Romanesque Revival style.

The building was commissioned by a local Church of Christ that had been meeting in a grammar school auditorium and was built with hired and volunteer labor; the first services were held on January 3, 1943, though the building was unfinished due to wartime restrictions on building materials. The Church of Christ moved to 805 E. Racine in 1985. After moving out, the building has been home to a succession of churches, with the building being owned by the Church of God of Prophecy (Spanish: Iglesia de Dios de la Profecia, also known as Templo Bethel and later Comunidad Cristiana Bethel). Other users have been Indian Trails Missions, which was authorized to use it as an office to assist immigrants applying for U.S. citizenship) and Living Waters Church, a Pentecostal church.

Its 2001 National Register nomination states that it was created as a religious facility, but does not identify the name or the type of religious facility which built it. It further states that at the time of nomination it was in use as a church, again without identifying its name or denomination.

It was deemed significant as an example of simplified Romanesque Revival style, and also for its use of brick as construction material. It was the only public building of brick construction in Casa Grande and one of only 13 brick buildings of any type; the others were residences or commercial buildings.
