= Johnston's Grocery Store =

- Johnson's Grocery Store
- U.S. National Register of Historic Places
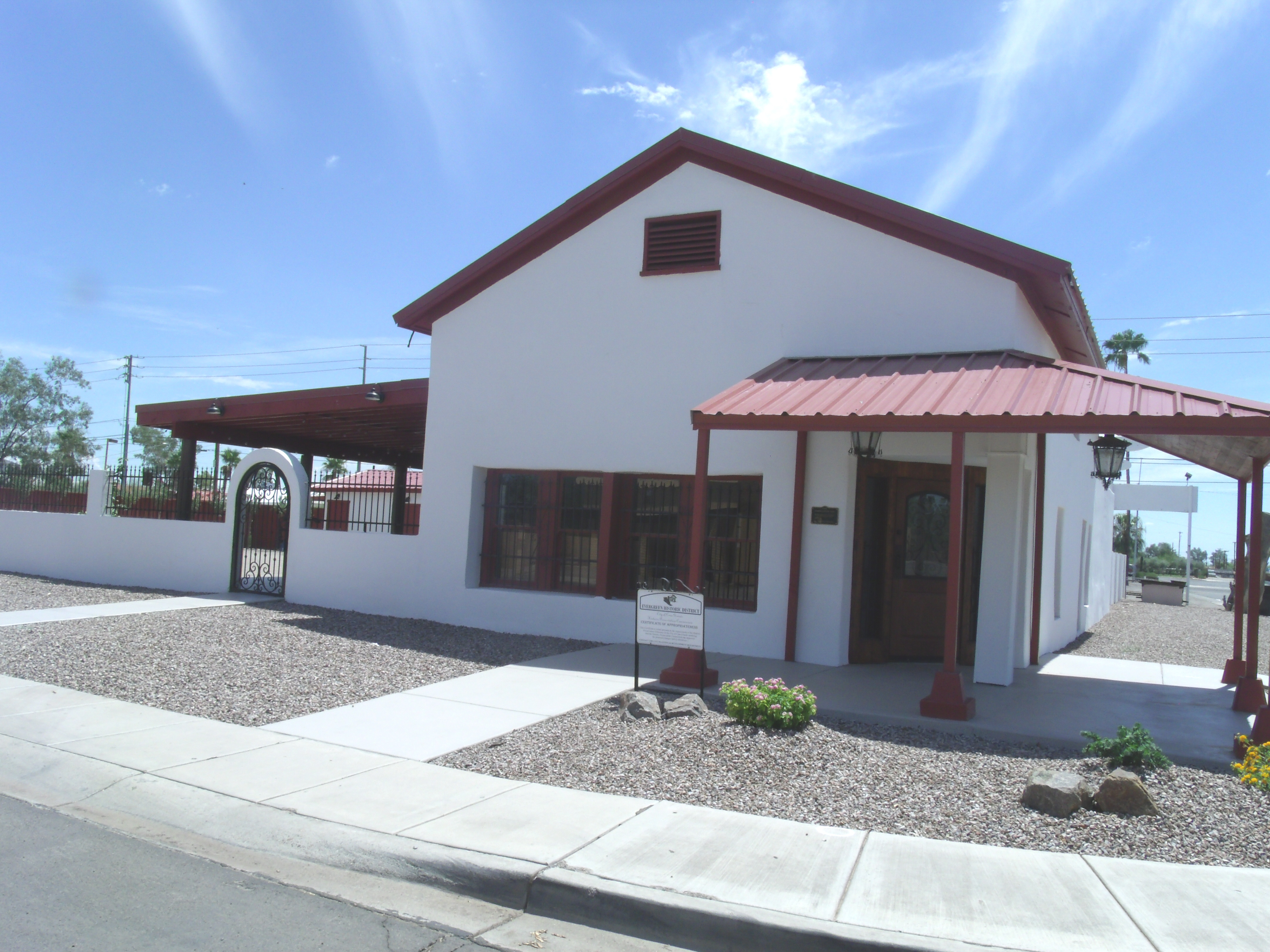
- Johnson's Grocery Store
- Location: 301 N. Picacho, Casa Grande, Arizona
- Coordinates: 32°52′36″N 111°45′02″W
- Area: less than one acre
- Built: c.1907
- MPS: Casa Grande MRA
- NRHP reference No.: 85000885
- Added to NRHP: April 16, 1985

Johnston's Grocery Store, at 301 N. Picacho in Casa Grande, Arizona, is a historic building built around 1907. It was listed on the National Register of Historic Places in 1985.

It was deemed significant for its use of adobe, which was rarely used for commercial buildings at the time of its construction. The building first served as a grocery store until 1932, first operated by Johnston and then by Wong Hong Chin. It was later home of Sofia's Mexican Chicken.

It was owned from 1920 to 1935 by George Washington Johnston. (Note: It was incorrectly documented and listed as "Johnson's", but the owner was named Johnston. As reported by a relative, see Talk:List of historic properties in Casa Grande, Arizona.)
