= Coolidge High School =

Coordinates: 32.9812°N 111.5294°W

Location
- 684 West Northern Avenue; Coolidge, Arizona 85128; United States

Information
- School type: Public high school
- Established: 1939 (87 years ago)
- School district: Coolidge Unified School District
- CEEB code: 030060
- Principal: Natay Ferguson
- Teaching staff: 39.01 (FTE)
- Grades: 9–12
- Enrollment: 684 (2023–2024)
- Student to teacher ratio: 17.53
- Colors: Royal blue and scarlet red
- Athletics conference: 3A – Central
- Mascot: Bear
- Website: chs.coolidgeschools.org

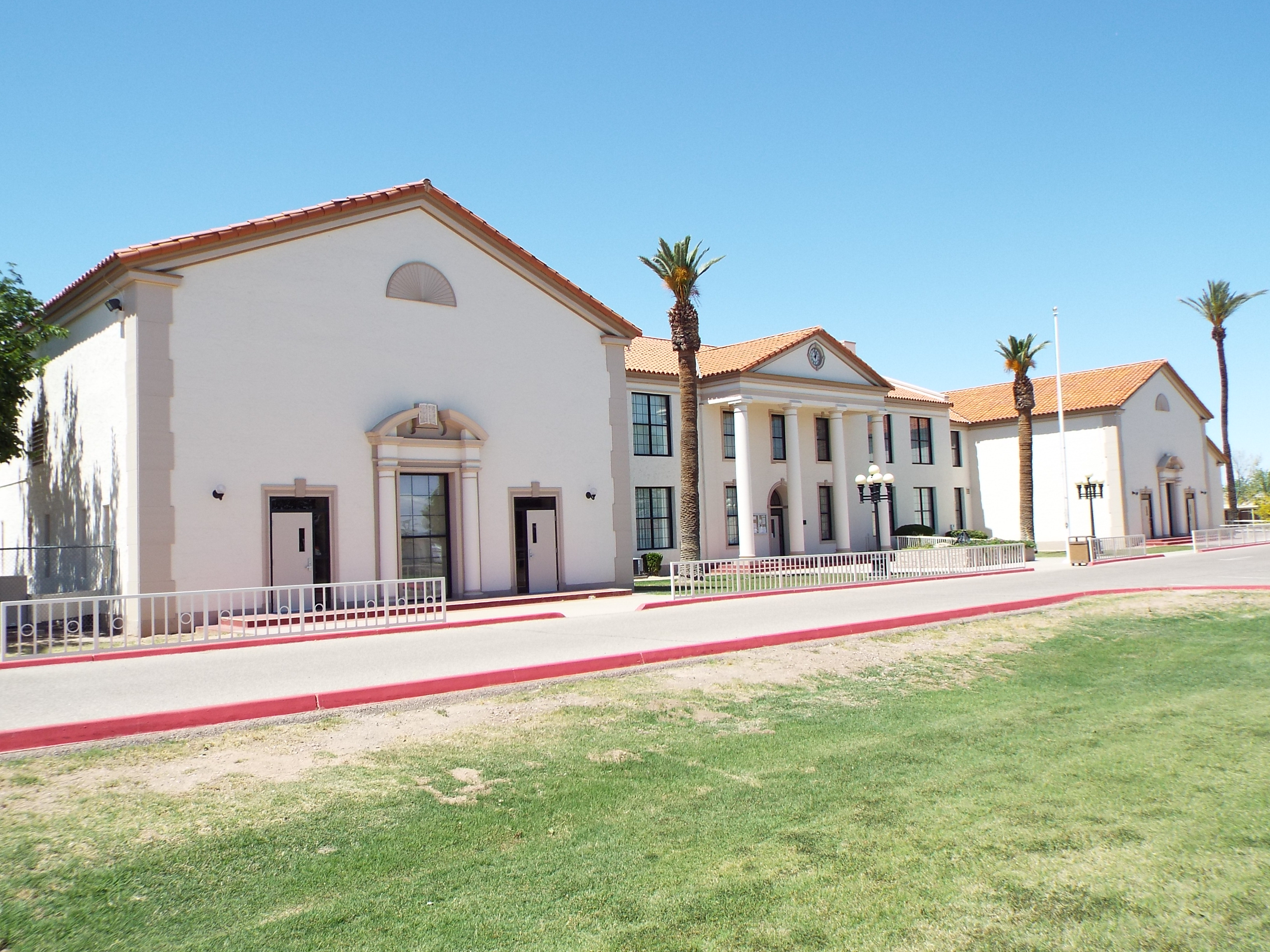
The original Coolidge High School built in 1939

Coolidge High School is a high school in Coolidge, Arizona which was established in 1939, and was renovated in 2005. It is located at 684 W. Northern Ave. It is one of two high schools under the jurisdiction of the Coolidge Unified School District. Coolidge High School shares its campus with Coolidge Junior High School.

The original Coolidge High School built in 1939 and is located at 450 N. Arizona Blvd. The building now houses the offices of the Coolidge Unified School District #23.

== Sports ==
Coolidge has many various types of sports. The Coolidge Bears have had a long-standing rivalry between Florence Unified School Districts, Florence Gophers.

Fall

- Football [Male]
- Volleyball [Female]
- Cross Country [Male and Female]
- Swim [Male and Female]

Winter

- Basketball [Male and Female]
- Soccer [Male and Female]
- Wrestling [Male and Female]

Spring

- Boys' Baseball [Male]
- Girls' Softball [Female]
- Tennis [Male and Female]
- Track [Male and Female]
