= White House (Casa Grande, Arizona) =

Historic house in Arizona, United States

- U.S. National Register of Historic Places
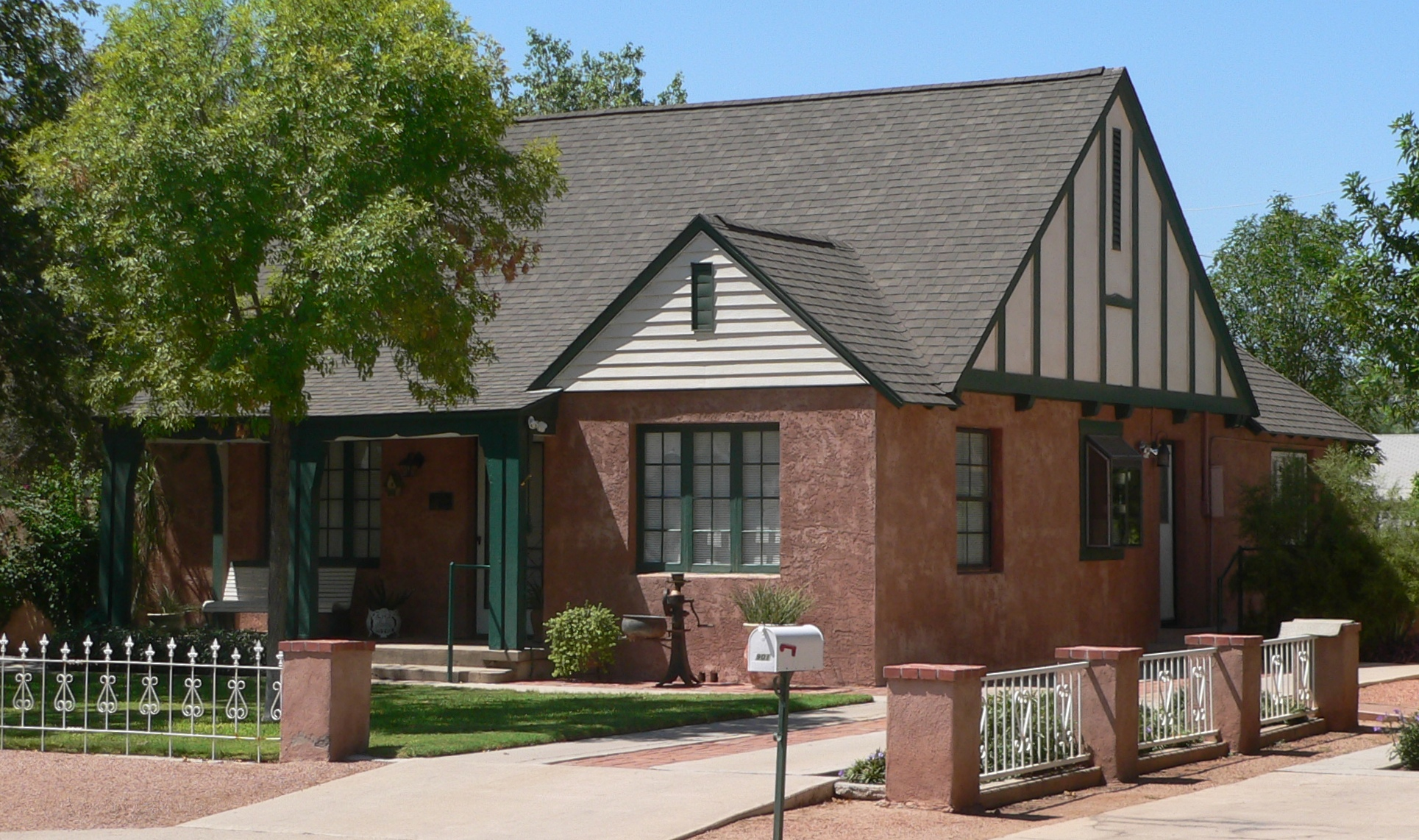

- Location within Arizona Location within the United States
- Location: 901 N. Morrison, Casa Grande, Arizona
- Coordinates: 32°52′54.35″N 111°44′48.4″W
- Area: less than one acre
- Built: ca. 1929
- Architectural style: Tudor Revival
- MPS: Casa Grande MRA
- NRHP reference No.: 85000899
- Added to NRHP: April 16, 1985

The White House in Casa Grande in Pinal County, Arizona is a Tudor Revival house built c. 1929. It was listed on the National Register of Historic Places in 1985.

It was noted to be the best example in Casa Grande of a Tudor Period Revival House. It was the home of J.W. White, a long-time resident who had an electrical company in Casa Grande.

== See also ==
- List of historic properties in Casa Grande, Arizona
