= Cruz Trading Post =

- U.S. National Register of Historic Places
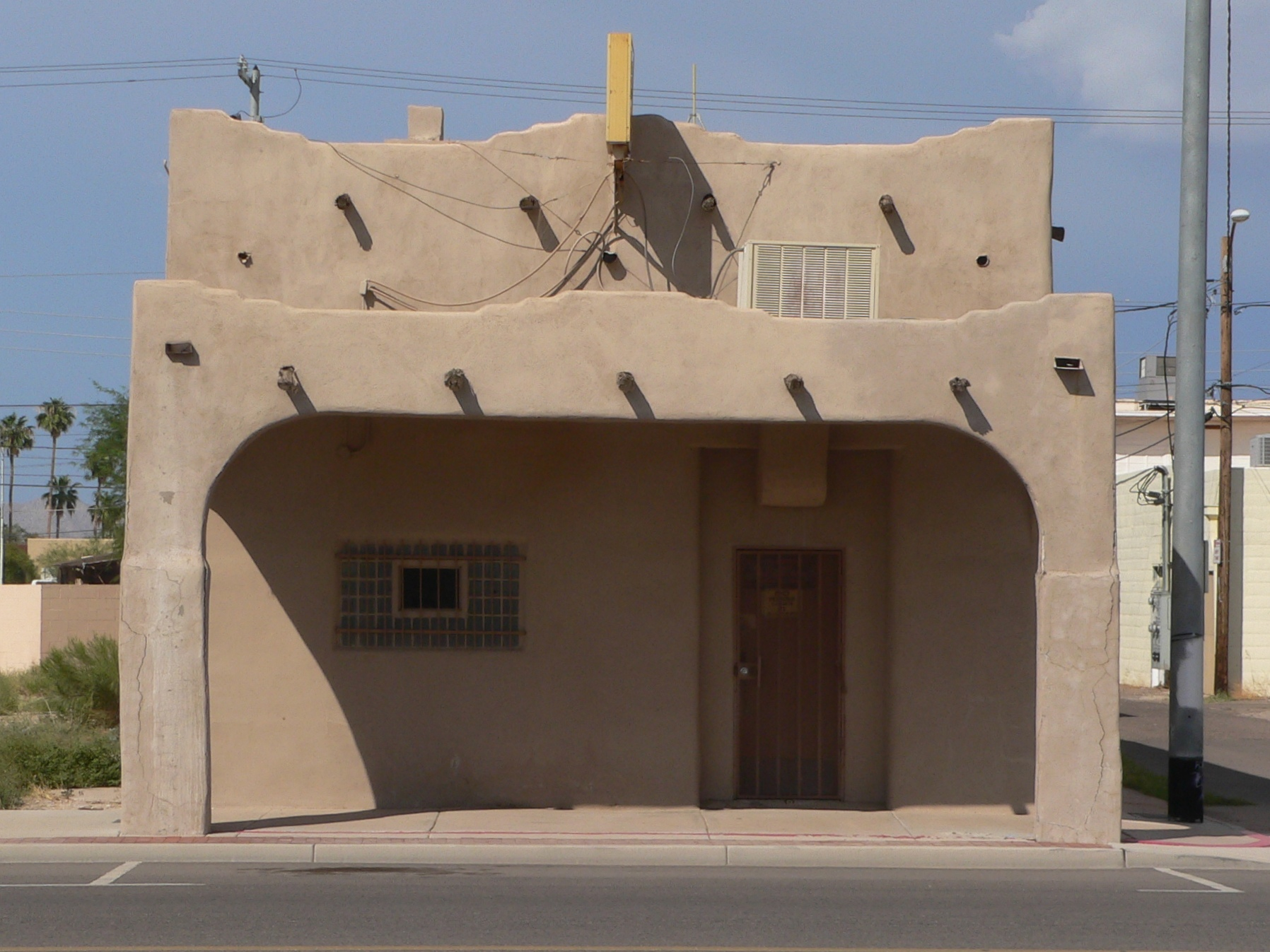

- Location within Arizona
- Location: 200 W. Main St., Casa Grande, Arizona
- Coordinates: 32.87643°N 111.75564°W
- Area: less than one acre
- Built: c.1888, c.1937
- Architectural style: Pueblo Revival
- MPS: Casa Grande MRA
- NRHP reference No.: 85000883
- Added to NRHP: April 16, 1985

The Cruz Trading Post at 200 W. Main St. in Casa Grande, Arizona was built around 1888. It was listed on the National Register of Historic Places in 1985.

It is a stuccoed adobe building, Pueblo Revival in style since it was modified into that style, around 1937:

Built by Thomas Tomlinson around 1888, it was originally a one-story rectangular adobe building with double entries and functioned as a general store and post office until 1897. Between 1897 and 1898 the building was operated as Ben Bible's Saloon. It continued to be used for general stores, offices for doctors, the telephone office, a lodge meeting hall, and as the Casa Grande Valley Bank building until 1937, when Ramon Cruz purchased it for his trading post.

The building was remodeled around that time into its current Pueblo Revival style, and served as an Indian trading post until 1955. In 1985, it was a tavern.

Ramon Cruz, Sr., was a well-known Casa Grande businessman. After operating a trading post in Sacatan he moved to Casa Grande in 1905 and opened a trading post. After his death in 1924, his sons continued the family business for man years. Cruz was a respected Casa Grande citizen and a member of the first elementary school board. This building is one of Casa Grande's oldest commercial buildings, is in sound condition, and retains its stylistic vigas and pressed tin ceiling. It is the only example in Casa Grande of a commercial building executed in a Pueblo Revival Style. Both the age of the building and the building's unique style contribute to its significance.

It was listed onto the National Register as part of a study of historic resources in Casa Grande.

AZCentral identified it as one of "Historic Pinal County properties you need to see" in 2016.
