= Coolidge, Arizona =

City in Arizona, United States

- City
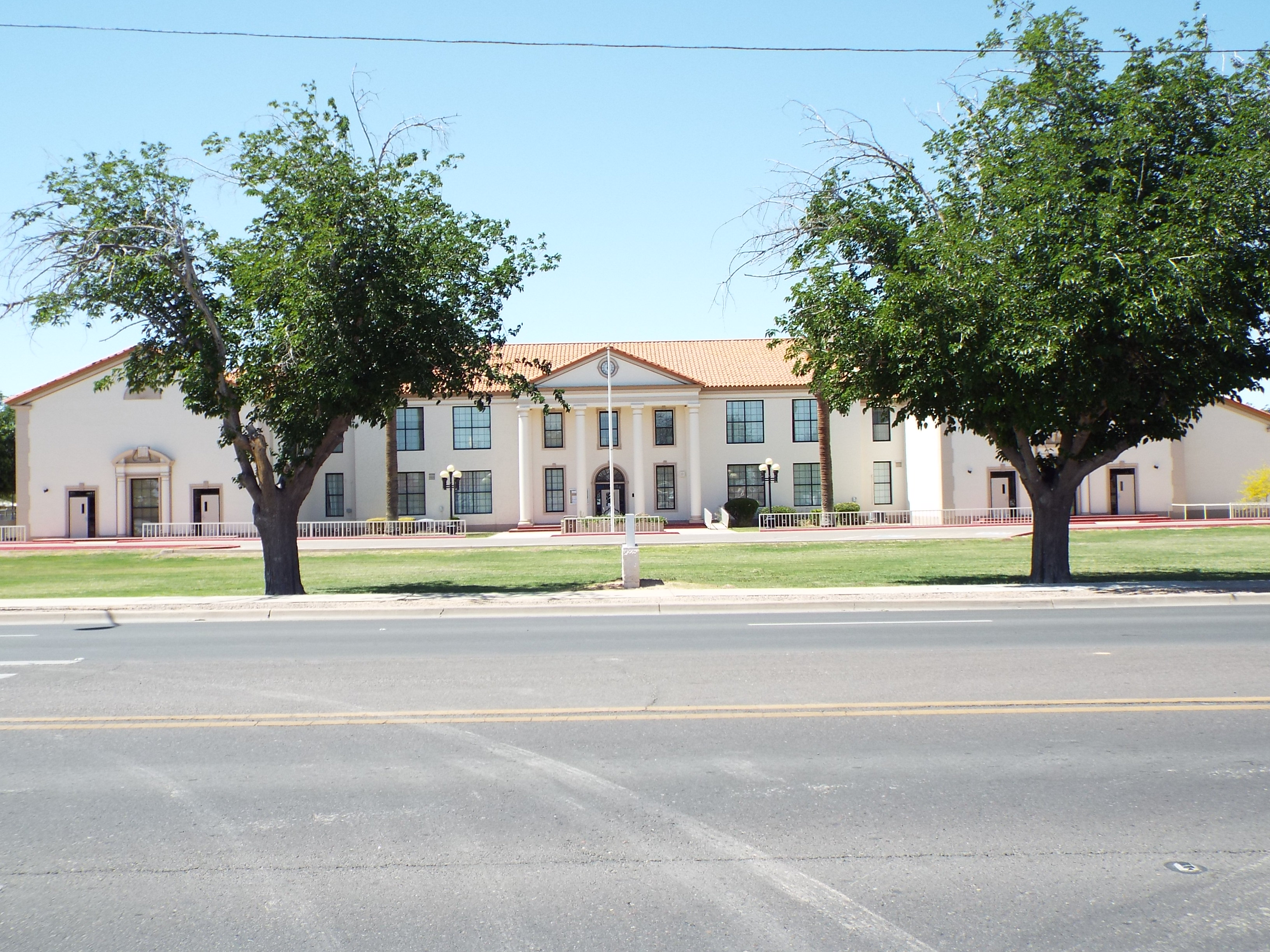
- Original 1939 Coolidge High School, now the office for Coolidge Unified School District

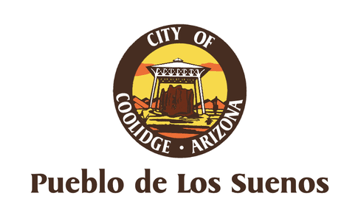
- Flag
- Nickname: Cooltown
- Location of Coolidge, Arizona

- Location within Arizona Location within the United States
- Coordinates: 32.933616°N 111.523585°W
- Country: United States
- State: Arizona
- County: Pinal
- Founded: 1925
- Incorporated: 1945

Government
  - Mayor: Jon Thompson (R)
  - Vice mayor: Tatiana Murrieta
  - City Council: Tom Bagnall; Ian Gillespie; Steve Hudson; Adriana Saavedra; Tom Shope

Area
  - City: 83.653 sq mi (216.660 km^{2})
  - Land: 83.473 sq mi (216.194 km^{2})
  - Water: 0.180 sq mi (0.467 km^{2}) 0.22%
- Elevation: 1,424 ft (434 m)

Population (2020)
  - City: 13,218
  - Estimate (2024): 19,674
  - Density: 240/sq mi (91/km^{2})
  - Urban: 12,008
  - Metro: 5,186,958
- Time zone: UTC–7 (Mountain (MST) (no DST))
- ZIP Code: 85128
- Area code: 520
- FIPS code: 04-15500
- GNIS feature ID: 2410221
- Website: coolidgeaz.com

Coolidge is a city in Pinal County, Arizona, United States. The population was 13,218 at the 2020 census, and was estimated to be 19,674 in 2024.

Coolidge is home of the Casa Grande Ruins National Monument. The monument was the first historic site to receive protected status by the United States Government in 1892. Coolidge is also home to both Central Arizona College and the Central Arizona Valley Institute of Technology.

== History ==
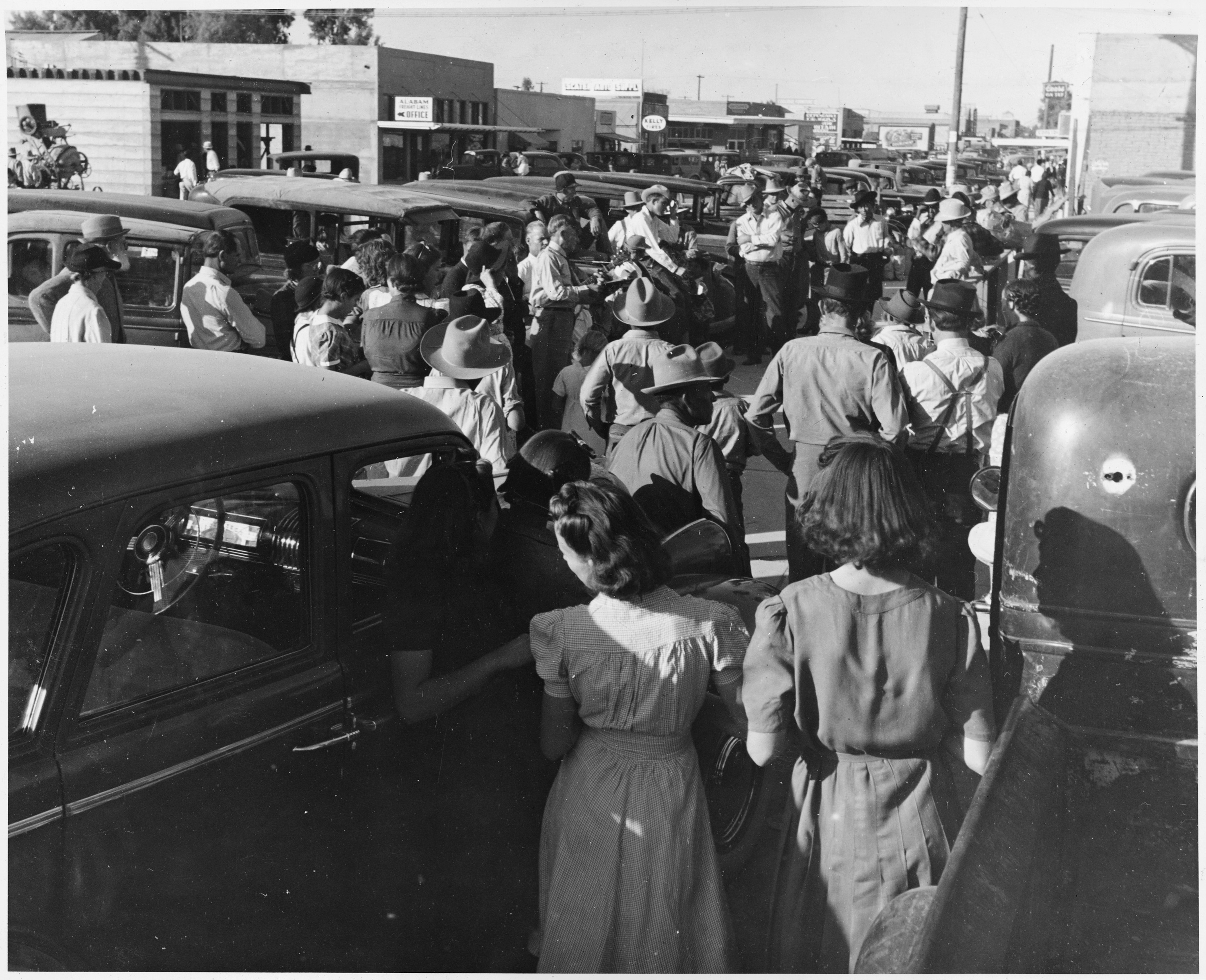
Main street of Coolidge on a Saturday afternoon during cotton harvest (ca. 1922–1953)

The area containing what is now the city of Coolidge was occupied by the Hohokam, an indigenous ancient Sonoran Desert people who built a massive compound consisting many of caliche structures and remained in the area for over 1,000 years. The only remaining and preserved structure from this compound is the Casa Grande Ruins National Monument.

The modern history of the city is centered around agriculture, particularly cotton. Coolidge was founded in 1925 when R.J. Jones laid out an 80 acres (32 ha) site during the construction of the Coolidge Dam on the nearby Gila River, which was completed in 1930. Both the dam and the townsite were named for Calvin Coolidge, the 30th President of the United States. The dam made the sandy soil native to the area into very rich farmland, and soon vast expanses of desert were plowed and acres of cotton were planted. This is when the area's status as the hub of the Arizona cotton industry was solidified and led to the incorporation of Coolidge as a city in 1945.

== Geography ==
According to the United States Census Bureau, the city has a total area of 83.653 square miles (216.66 km^{2}), of which 83.473 square miles (216.19 km^{2}) is land and 0.180 square miles (0.47 km^{2}) (0.22%) is water. It contains no mountains and is almost entirely flat, lying in a fertile valley located just south of the Gila River. The Sacaton Mountains are visible to the west, and the Picacho Mountains are visible to the southeast.

Arizona State Route 87 and Arizona State Route 287 pass through the town, providing connections to the Phoenix metropolitan area, Casa Grande, and Eloy. Interstate 10 is located approximately 10 miles (16 km) to the west. Coolidge is 56 miles (90 km) southeast of Phoenix, 69 miles (111 km) northwest of Tucson, 21 miles (34 km) northeast of Casa Grande and 11 miles southwest of Florence. Picacho Reservoir is just 11 miles (18 km) south of town.

=== Climate ===
Coolidge features a hot desert climate (Köppen climate classification BWh), typical of the Sonoran Desert. Winters are characterized by abundant sunshine and are typically brief and mild, consisting of daytime highs in the 65 °F (18 °C) to 75 °F (24 °C) range. Lows are usually between 35 °F (2 °C) and 45 °F (7 °C), though several freezes occur annually. Rain is infrequent, occurring 2–3 days per month usually following the passage of a cold front. The record low temperature for the city is 8 °F (−13 °C).

Summers are long and very hot, with temperatures of 100 °F (38 °C) to 110 °F (43 °C) almost daily from the end of May until September, with temperatures above 115 °F (46 °C) not uncommon. The record high temperature for the city is 123 °F (51 °C). Summertime lows are usually above 70 °F (21 °C), with occasional periods of lows above 80 °F (27 °C). Coolidge is affected by the North American Monsoon, which brings brief heavy downpours and gusty winds in the second half of summer. Severe events can sometimes cause haboobs and flash flooding.

Climate data for Casa Grande Ruins National Monument, Arizona (1991–2020 normals, extremes 1908–1916 and 1932–present)
Month	Jan	Feb	Mar	Apr	May	Jun	Jul	Aug	Sep	Oct	Nov	Dec	Year
Record high °F (°C)	89 (32)	93 (34)	100 (38)	106 (41)	116 (47)	123 (51)	123 (51)	120 (49)	115 (46)	111 (44)	97 (36)	89 (32)	123 (51)
Mean maximum °F (°C)	78.8 (26.0)	82.7 (28.2)	90.8 (32.7)	99.2 (37.3)	106.8 (41.6)	113.9 (45.5)	114.8 (46.0)	113.1 (45.1)	108.9 (42.7)	102.0 (38.9)	89.9 (32.2)	79.1 (26.2)	116.1 (46.7)
Mean daily maximum °F (°C)	67.6 (19.8)	71.3 (21.8)	78.2 (25.7)	86.4 (30.2)	95.2 (35.1)	105.1 (40.6)	106.6 (41.4)	104.9 (40.5)	100.7 (38.2)	90.5 (32.5)	77.8 (25.4)	66.9 (19.4)	87.6 (30.9)
Daily mean °F (°C)	52.3 (11.3)	55.5 (13.1)	61.7 (16.5)	68.6 (20.3)	77.2 (25.1)	86.6 (30.3)	91.8 (33.2)	90.8 (32.7)	85.2 (29.6)	73.4 (23.0)	60.8 (16.0)	51.6 (10.9)	71.3 (21.8)
Mean daily minimum °F (°C)	37.0 (2.8)	39.7 (4.3)	45.2 (7.3)	50.8 (10.4)	59.2 (15.1)	68.0 (20.0)	77.1 (25.1)	76.6 (24.8)	69.8 (21.0)	56.3 (13.5)	43.7 (6.5)	36.3 (2.4)	55.0 (12.8)
Mean minimum °F (°C)	26.1 (−3.3)	29.0 (−1.7)	33.6 (0.9)	38.5 (3.6)	46.5 (8.1)	56.3 (13.5)	66.5 (19.2)	66.7 (19.3)	56.6 (13.7)	42.7 (5.9)	29.1 (−1.6)	25.7 (−3.5)	23.0 (−5.0)
Record low °F (°C)	8 (−13)	11 (−12)	21 (−6)	25 (−4)	32 (0)	44 (7)	51 (11)	55 (13)	37 (3)	25 (−4)	17 (−8)	14 (−10)	8 (−13)
Average precipitation inches (mm)	0.98 (25)	1.02 (26)	0.94 (24)	0.25 (6.4)	0.20 (5.1)	0.06 (1.5)	1.12 (28)	1.24 (31)	0.70 (18)	0.48 (12)	0.49 (12)	0.77 (20)	8.25 (210)
Average precipitation days	4.4	4.2	3.2	1.4	1.3	0.6	4.7	5.3	3.3	2.2	2.0	4.2	36.8
Source: NOAA

== Demographics ==
Historical population
Census	Pop.	Note	%±
1960	4,990		—
1970	5,314		6.5%
1980	6,851		28.9%
1990	6,934		1.2%
2000	7,786		12.3%
2010	11,825		51.9%
2020	13,218		11.8%
2024 (est.)	19,674	▲	48.8%
U.S. Decennial Census; 2020 Census

=== Racial and ethnic composition ===
Coolidge, Arizona – racial and ethnic composition Note: the US Census treats Hispanic/Latino as an ethnic category. This table excludes Latinos from the racial categories and assigns them to a separate category. Hispanics/Latinos may be of any race.
Race / ethnicity (NH = non-Hispanic)	Pop. 2000	Pop. 2010	Pop. 2020	% 2000	% 2010	% 2020
White alone (NH)	3,609	5,153	5,389	46.35%	43.58%	40.77%
Black or African American alone (NH)	623	868	1,107	8.00%	7.34%	8.37%
Native American or Alaska Native alone (NH)	349	445	417	4.48%	3.76%	3.15%
Asian alone (NH)	52	103	105	0.67%	0.87%	0.79%
Pacific Islander alone (NH)	2	9	10	0.03%	0.08%	0.08%
Other race alone (NH)	3	10	64	0.04%	0.08%	0.48%
Mixed race or multiracial (NH)	96	275	495	1.23%	2.33%	3.74%
Hispanic or Latino (any race)	3,052	4,962	5,631	39.20%	41.96%	42.60%
Total	7,786	11,825	13,218	100.00%	100.00%	100.00%

=== 2020 census ===
As of the 2020 census, Coolidge had a population of 13,218. The median age was 34.1 years. 29.6% of residents were under the age of 18 and 14.9% were 65 years of age or older. For every 100 females there were 94.3 males, and for every 100 females age 18 and over there were 93.0 males age 18 and over.

There were 4,399 households and 3,110 families residing in the city. Of all households, 39.5% had children under the age of 18 living in them. 41.1% were married-couple households, 19.8% were households with a male householder and no spouse or partner present, and 28.8% were households with a female householder and no spouse or partner present. About 22.6% of all households were made up of individuals, and 10.8% had someone living alone who was 65 years of age or older.

There were 4,871 housing units, of which 9.7% were vacant. The homeowner vacancy rate was 1.3% and the rental vacancy rate was 6.7%. The population density was 173.31 inhabitants per square mile (66.9/km^{2}). There were 63.87 per square mile (24.7/km^{2}) housing units per square mile.

90.7% of residents lived in urban areas, while 9.3% lived in rural areas.

=== 2010 census ===
As of the 2010 census, there were 11,825 people, 3,947 households, _ families residing in the city. The population density was 209.34 inhabitants per square mile (80.8/km^{2}). There were 4,796 housing units at an average density of 84.90 per square mile (32.8/km^{2}). The racial makeup of the city was 62.73% White, 7.85% African American, 5.67% Native American, 0.97% Asian, 0.11% Pacific Islander, 17.72% from some other races and 4.96% from two or more races. Hispanic or Latino people of any race were 41.96% of the population.

=== 2000 census ===
As of the 2000 census, there were 7,786 people, 2,585 households, and 1,938 families residing in the city. The population density was 1,549.1 inhabitants per square mile (598.1/km^{2}). There were 3,212 housing units at an average density of 639.1 per square mile (246.8/km^{2}). The racial makeup of the city was 57.85% White, 8.30% African American, 5.63% Native American, 0.72% Asian, 0.05% Pacific Islander, 23.58% from some other races and 3.88% from two or more races. Hispanic or Latino people of any race were 39.20% of the population.

There were 2,585 households, out of which 38.5% had children under age 18 living with them, 48.8% were married couples living together, 19.3% had a female householder with no husband present, and 25.0% were non-families. 20.8% of all households were made up of individuals, and 9.9% had someone living alone who was 65 years of age or older. The average household size was 3.00 and the average family size was 3.44.

In the city, the population was spread out, with 32.9% under age 18, 10.4% aged 18–24, 24.4% aged 25–44, 18.9% aged 45–64, and 13.4% who were aged 65 years or older. The median age was 31 years. For every 100 females, there were 93.2 males. For every 100 females age 18 and over, there were 88.1 males.

The median income for a household in the city was $29,049, and the median income for a family was $33,536. Males had a median income of $29,159 versus $21,472 for females. The per capita income for the city was $13,663. About 20.9% of families and 24.7% of the population were below the poverty line, including 30.9% of those under age 18 and 20.5% of those age 65 or over.

=== Recent estimates ===
According to realtor website Zillow, the average price of a home as of June 30, 2025, in Coolidge is $276,260.

As of the 2023 American Community Survey, there are 4,935 estimated households in Coolidge with an average of 3.10 persons per household. The city has a median household income of $57,161. Approximately 22.2% of the city's population lives at or below the poverty line. Coolidge has an estimated 62.2% employment rate, with 13.2% of the population holding a bachelor's degree or higher and 85.8% holding a high school diploma.

== Economy ==
Until the 1950s, the city's economy was completely dependent on mining and cotton. It has since diversified to include manufacturing, regional trade, and services for agricultural producers and farm families.

In 2019, Nikola Motor Company purchased 389 acres (157 ha) in Coolidge and operates a factory for zero-emissions heavy trucks, with a production capacity of 2,500 trucks per year.

== Education ==
- Coolidge High School, a high school located in the central part of the city.
- Heartland Ranch Elementary School, a K-5 school located in the Heartland Ranch neighborhood.
- West Elementary School, a K-5 school located in the western part of the city.
- Coolidge Alternative Program; a 6-12 alternative program located on the boulevard.
- Imagine Schools Coolidge Elementary, a K-5 charter school
- Imagine Prep Coolidge, a 6–12 charter school located adjacent to Imagine Coolidge Elementary.
- Central Arizona College
- Central Arizona Valley Institute of Technology
- Coolidge Junior High School, a junior high school with grades 6-8

== Infrastructure ==
=== Transportation ===
The city of Coolidge operates the Cotton Express, which provides local bus service. The city of Coolidge also operates Central Arizona Regional Transit (CART), which provides transportation between Florence, Coolidge, Central Arizona College and Casa Grande.

The town was home to a station for Amtrak; it closed in June 1996.

The Coolidge Municipal Airport, which has two asphalt runways, is located 5 miles (8.0 km) southeast of the city and had 56,050 aircraft operations in the yearly period ending April 2, 2020. The closest major airports to Coolidge are Phoenix Sky Harbor International Airport and Tucson International Airport. Casa Grande Shuttle provides an airport shuttle to Sky Harbor.

== Notable people ==
- Duane Eddy – rock & roll guitarist and record producer, Coolidge High School graduate
- Lee Hazlewood – disc jockey, singer, songwriter, and record producer
- Waylon Jennings – singer, Country Music Hall of Fame
- Sammi Smith – country music recording artist and songwriter

== Historic properties ==
Historic properties in Coolidge, Arizona
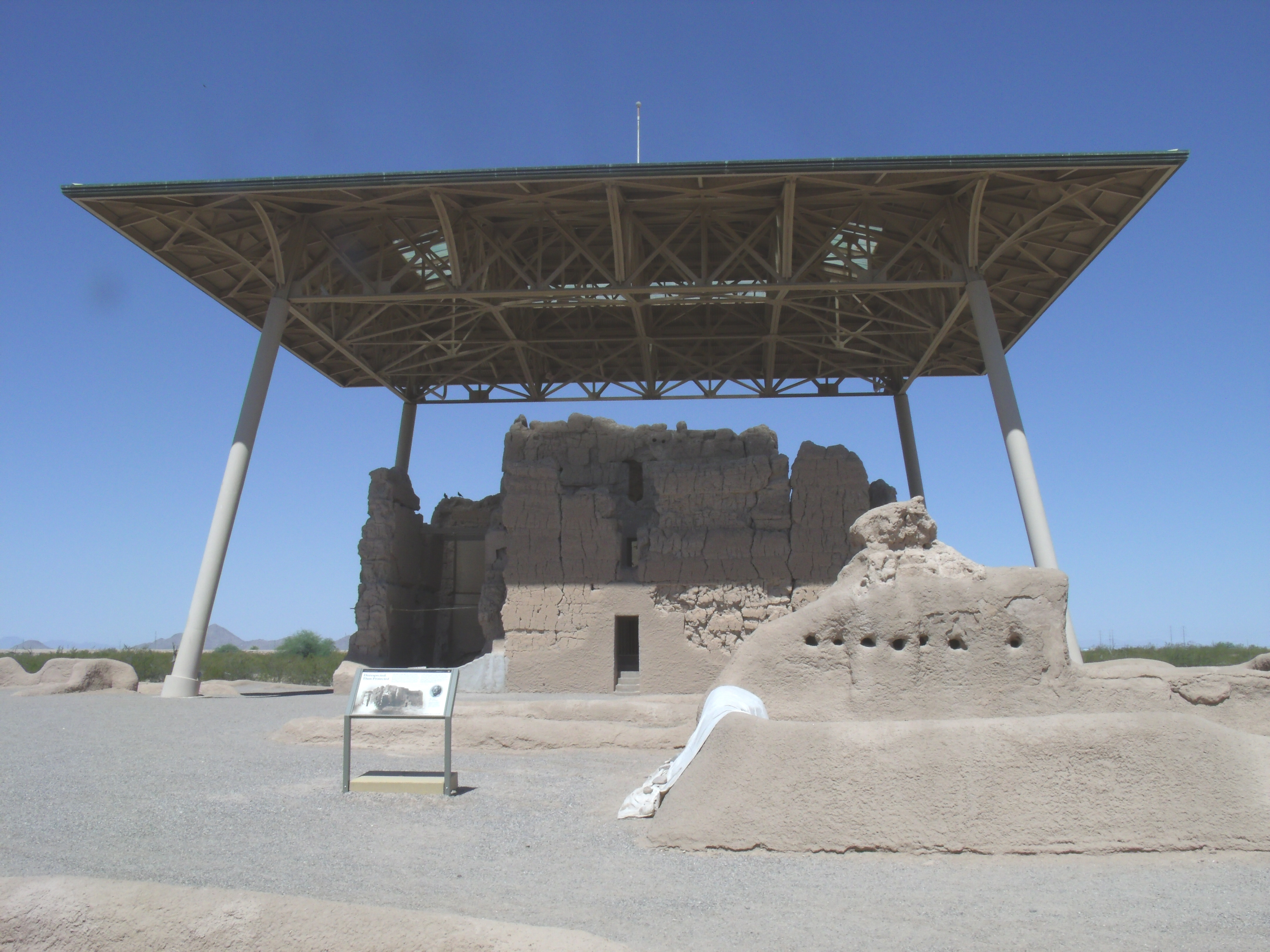
The Casa Grande Ruins are located at Ruins Drive in Coolidge, Az. Built by the Hohokam, the Casa Grande was abandoned around 1450 CE. Written historic accounts of the Casa Grande begin with the journal entries of Padre Eusebio Francisco Kino when he visited the ruins in 1694. Listed in the National Register of Historic Places in 1966, and reference #66000192.

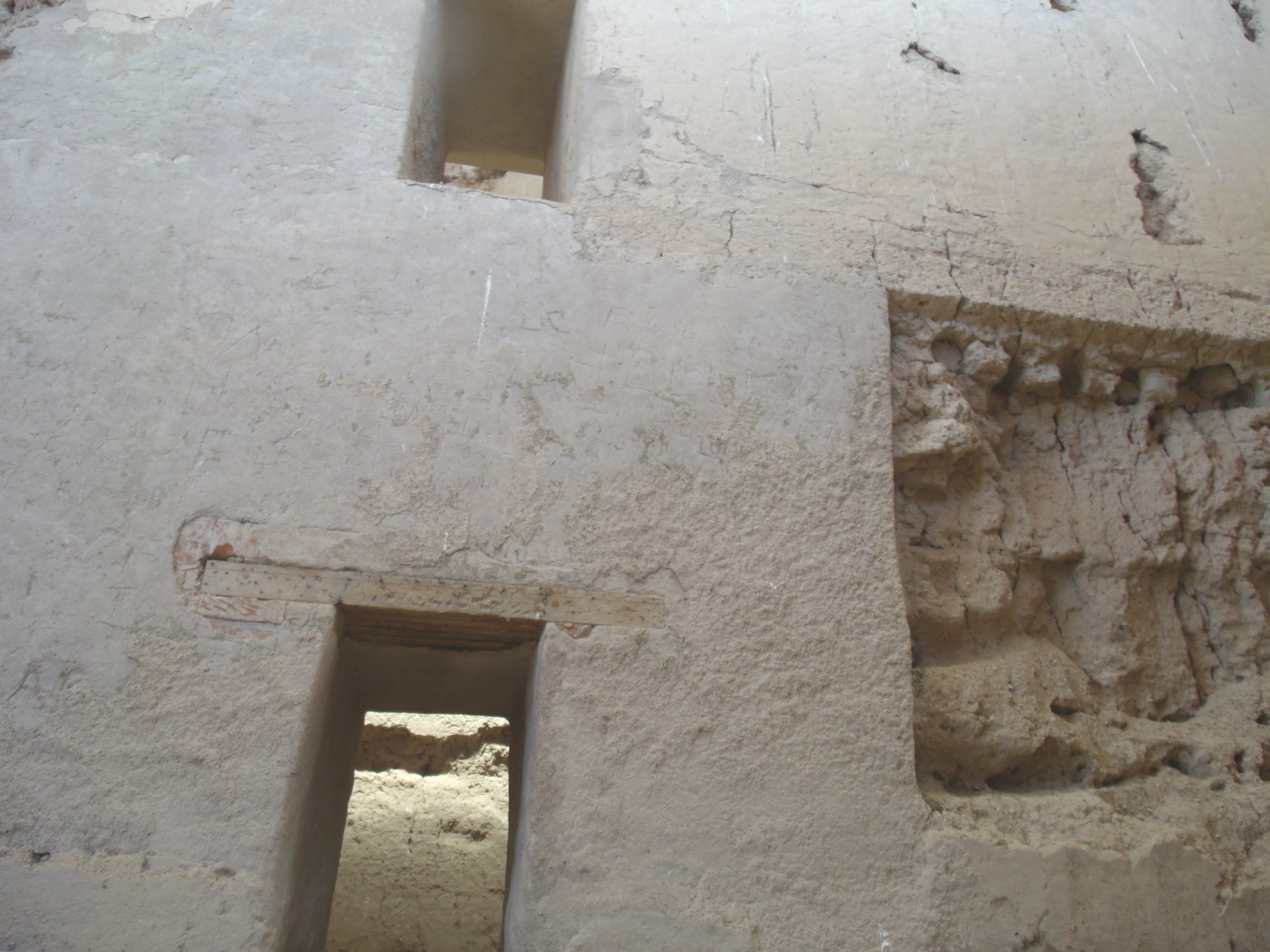
Inside the Casa Grande Big House Ruins

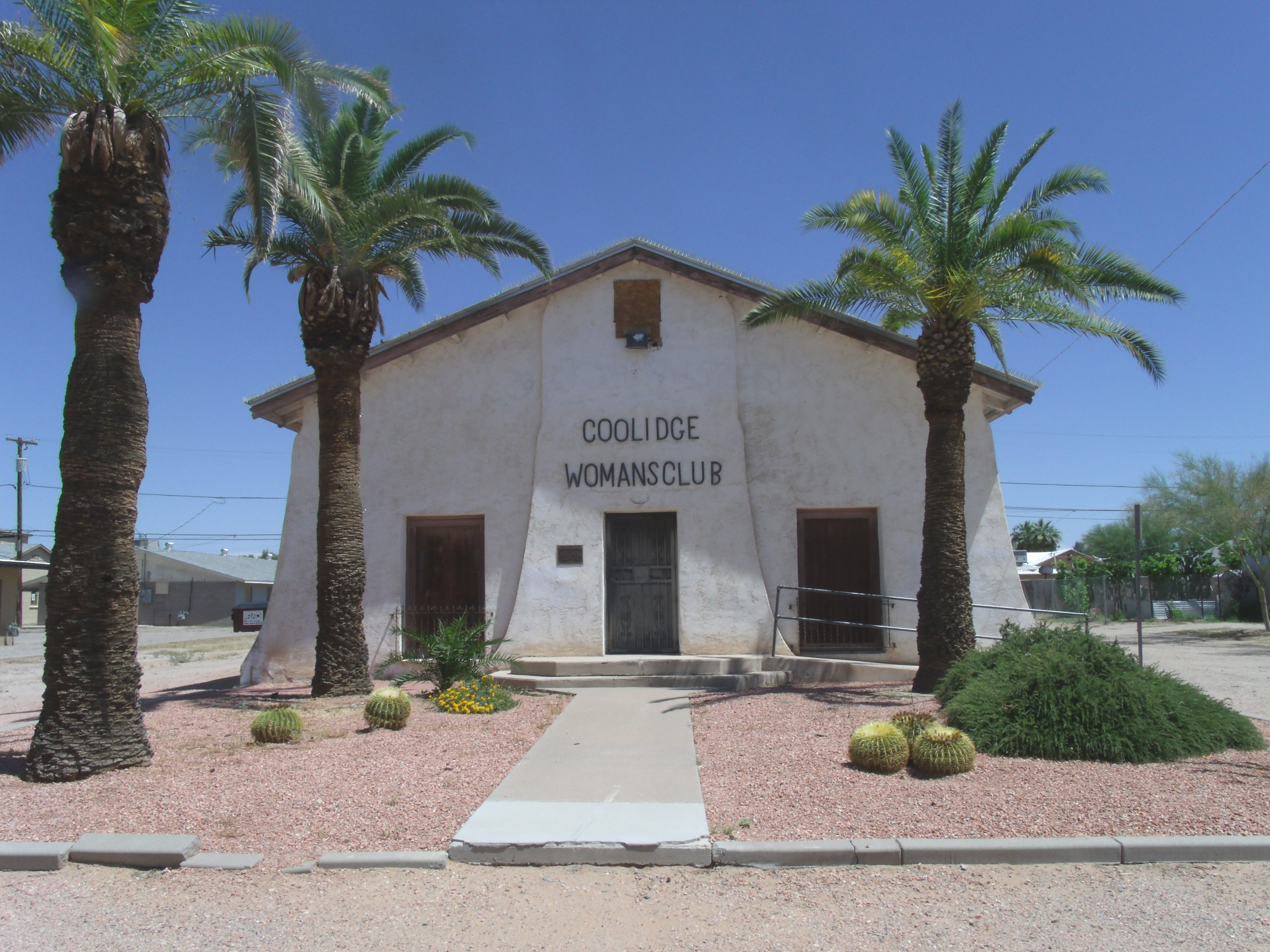
The Coolidge Woman's Club (Building) was built in 1925 and is located at 240 W. Pinkley Ave., Coolidge, Arizona. The building was listed in the National Register of Historic Places in 1990, reference #900015924.

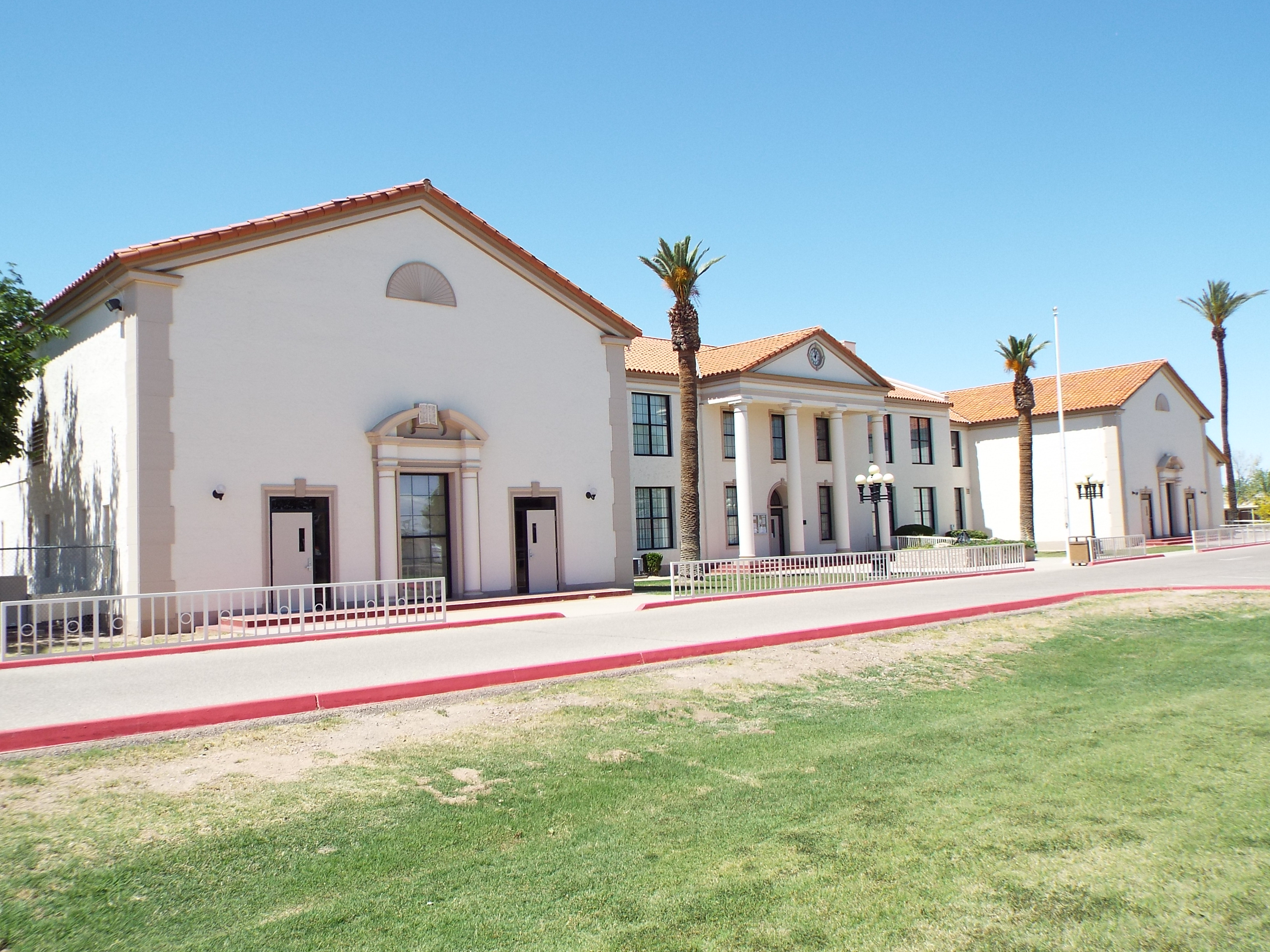
Historic Coolidge High School built in 1939 and NRHP eligible. The building now houses the offices of the Coolidge Unified School District No. 21.

== See also ==
- Central Arizona College
- Central Arizona Valley Institute of Technology
- Coolidge Municipal Airport
- Coolidge Dam
