= Greenwood/Memory Lawn Mortuary & Cemetery =

Cemetery in Phoenix, Arizona

Greenwood Memory Lawn Mortuary & Cemetery
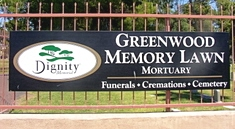
- Greenwood Memory Lawn Mortuary & Cemetery
- Interactive map of Greenwood Memory Lawn Mortuary & Cemetery

Details
- Established: 1906
- Location: 2300 West Van Buren Street, Phoenix, Arizona
- Country: U.S.
- Coordinates: 33°27′17″N 112°06′58″W
- Owned by: Dignity Memorial
- Size: 192 acres
- No. of interments: >72,000
- Website: Greenwood Memory Lawn Mortuary
- Find a Grave: Greenwood Memory Lawn Mortuary & Cemetery

Greenwood Memory Lawn Mortuary & Cemetery is the name of a cemetery located at 2300 West Van Buren Street in Phoenix, Arizona owned by Dignity Memorial. The cemetery, which resulted as a merger of two historical cemeteries, Greenwood Memorial Park and Memory Lawn Memorial Park, is the final resting place of many famous residents of Arizona. Pioneers, governors, congressman, government officials, journalists, race car drivers, soldiers, actors and actresses are among the decedents who are interred in the cemetery.

== History ==
=== Greenwood Memorial Park ===
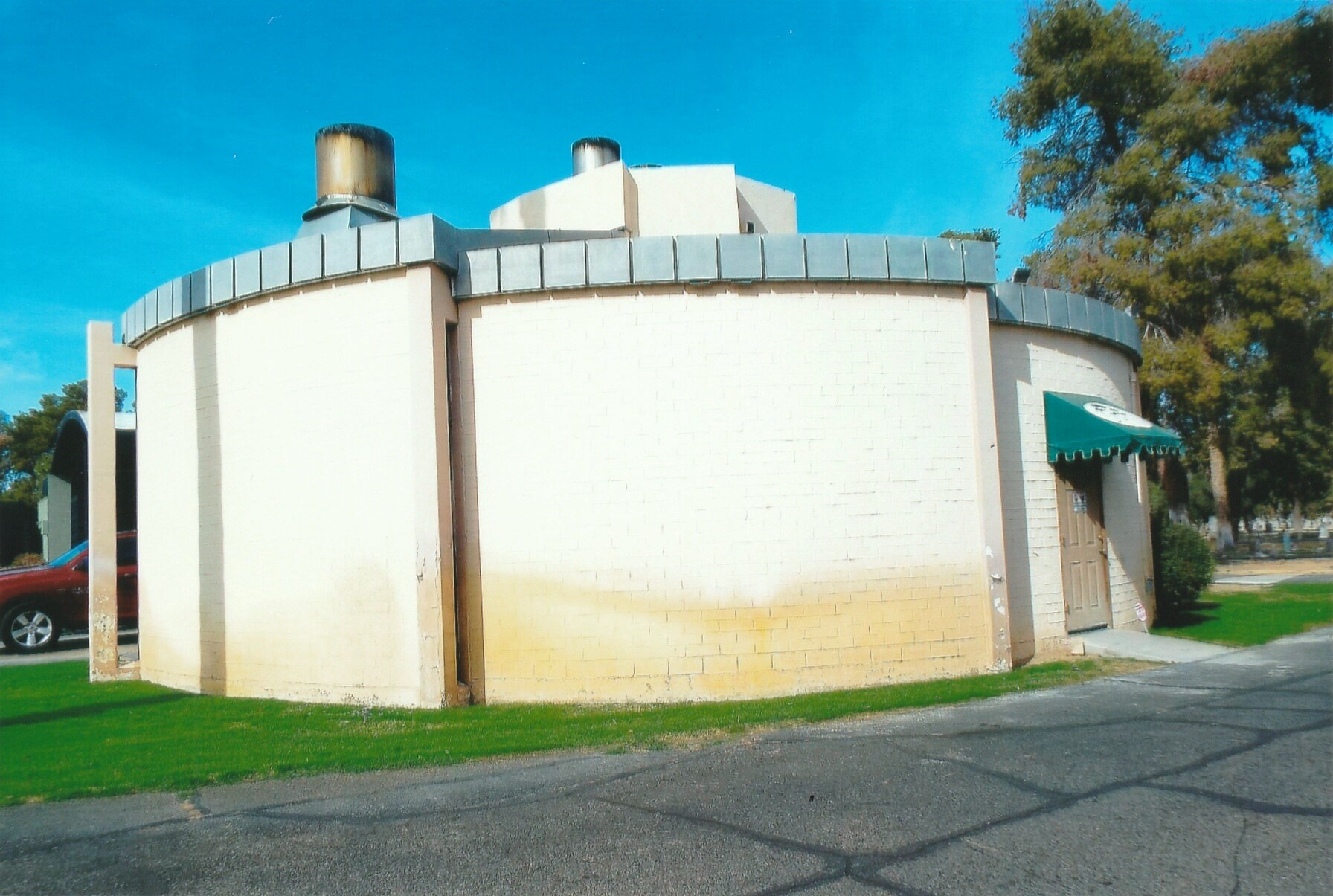
Original Greenwood Memorial Park 1906 crematorium.

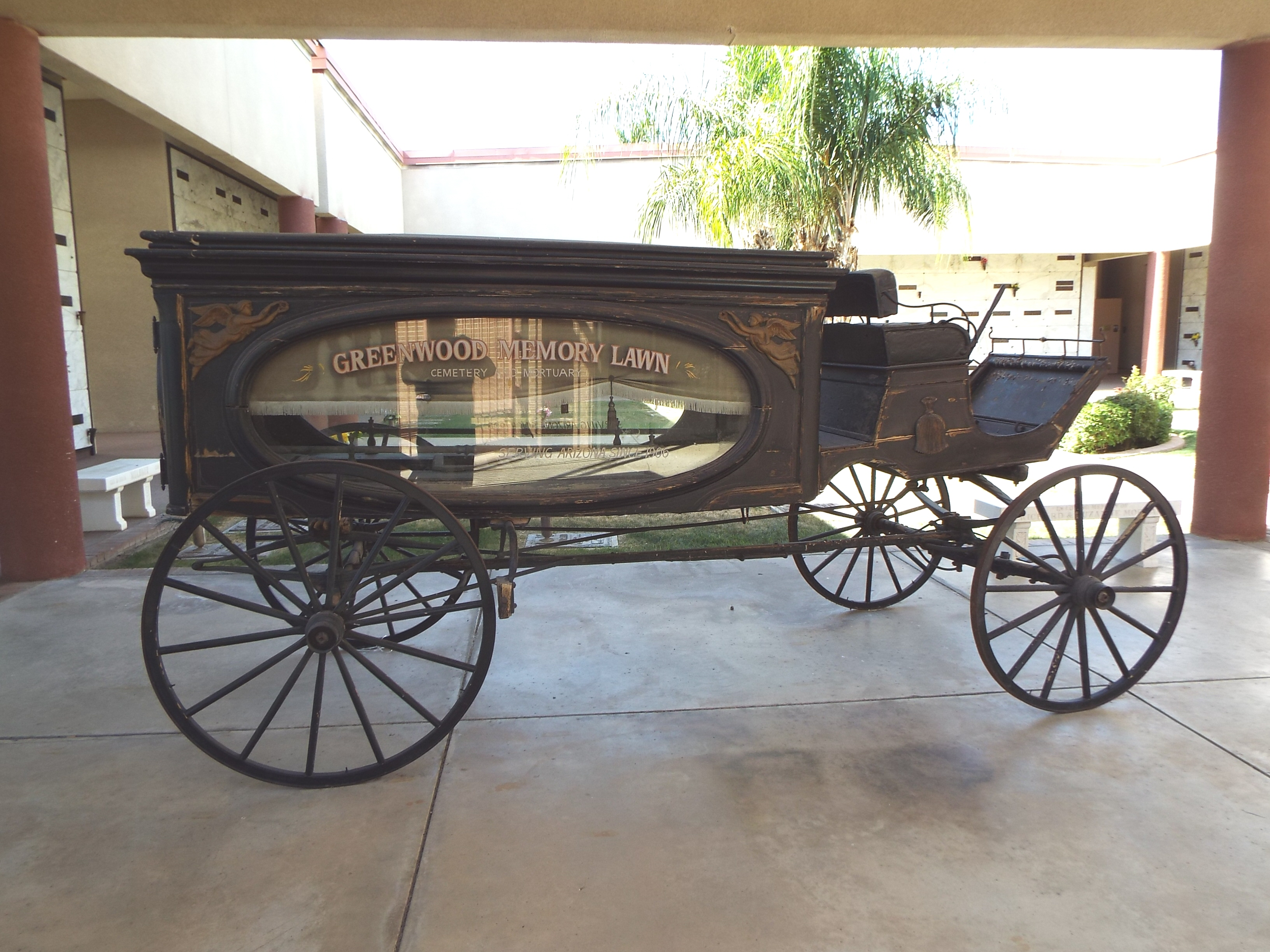
Late 19th century horse-drawn hearse on display in Greenwood/Memory Lawn Mortuary & Cemetery

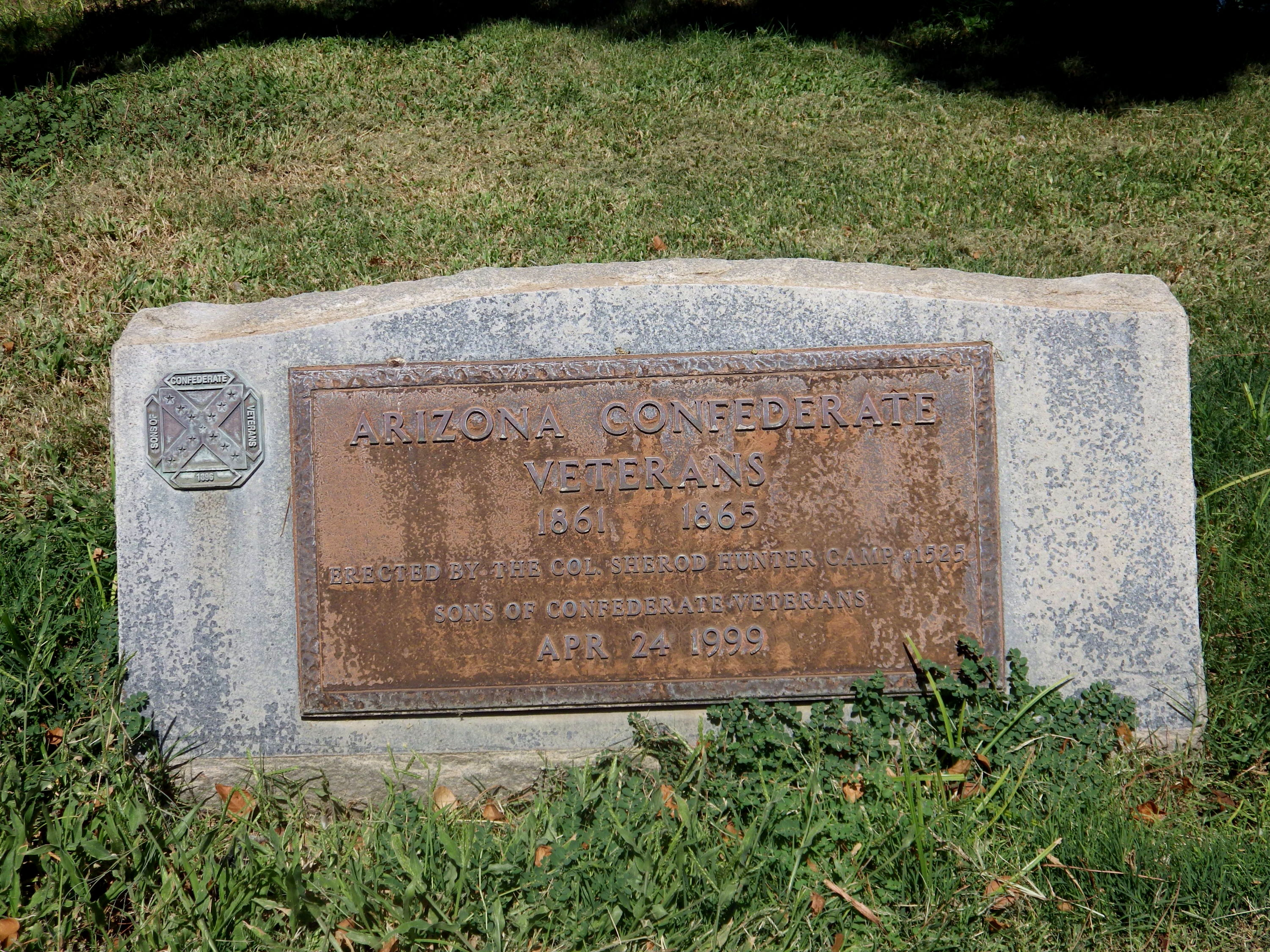
Confederate States of America marker

Greenwood Memorial Park, the first of the two cemeteries which make up Greenwood/Memory Lawn Mortuary & Cemetery, was established in 1906, by the Arizona Lodge No. 2 of the Free and Accepted Masons. The first early structures in the cemetery were a crematorium, a columbarium and a mausoleum.

=== PFC Thomas C. Reed incident ===
According to the book "History and Memory in African American Culture"; by Genevieve Fabres and Robert O'Meally, the Greenwood Memorial Park cemetery had a racial policy and was involved in a controversy. In November 1951, the body of PFC Thomas C. Reed, a 19 year old African-American soldier who was killed in the Korean War, remained unburied in a mortuary owned by Lincoln Ragsdale because the Greenwood Memorial Park cemetery officials requested letters of petition from 3 veterans' organizations accepting the body. The American Legion, the Veterans of Foreign Wars and the Disabled American Veterans organizations wanted to put an end to this procedure and to the discriminatory practices of the cemetery and therefore, did not provide the requested letters. Ragsdale worked with the Greater Phoenix Council for Civic Unity (GPCCU) with the intention of publicizing the controversy in the media, both locally and nationally. His actions caught the attention of Thomasena Grigsby, a fellow activist, who then published an editorial in The Chicago Defender. After a three-month standoff the Board of Trustees of the cemetery voted on January 8, 1952, to admit African-American veterans on the same terms as those of the "White" race. Reed was finally buried in the veterans' section of the cemetery.

=== Memory Lawn Memorial Park ===
The Shumway family established another cemetery to the west of the Greenwood Memorial Park in 1947, named Memory Lawn Memorial Park. A fence separated the cemetery from the Greenwood Memorial Park. This cemetery added a mortuary, memory mausoleum and chapel in 1957.

In 1989, the cemeteries merged and became the Greenwood/Memory Lawn Mortuary & Cemetery. The cemetery joined the Dignity Memorial network which provides funeral, cremation and cemetery services.

Greenwood/Memory Lawn Mortuary & Cemetery with its 192 acres (78 ha) is the largest cemetery in Arizona. The cemetery has 59 sections, including a front lawn section, a veterans garden and various other cultural and religious gardens. The cemetery has a monument, which was organized in 1885 and erected in 1910, dedicated to the memory of the deceased members of the Phoenix Volunteer Fire Department.

== Mausoleums ==
A mausoleum is an external free-standing building constructed as a monument enclosing the interment space or burial chamber of a deceased person or people. In Greenwood/Memory Lawn Mortuary & Cemetery there are three mausoleums, they are:

- Encanto Mausoleum – The Encanto Mausoleum is divided into The sections are called "Gardenia", "Palms", "Roses", "Evergreen", "Acacia", "Lillies", "Camellia", "Original Mausoleum" and 'Veranda".
- Memory Mausoleum
- Serenity Mausoleum – On the grounds of the Serenity Mausoleum there is a chapel, The Mausoleum is divided into three sections. The sections are called "Faith", "Hope" and "Peace"

== Notable Interments ==
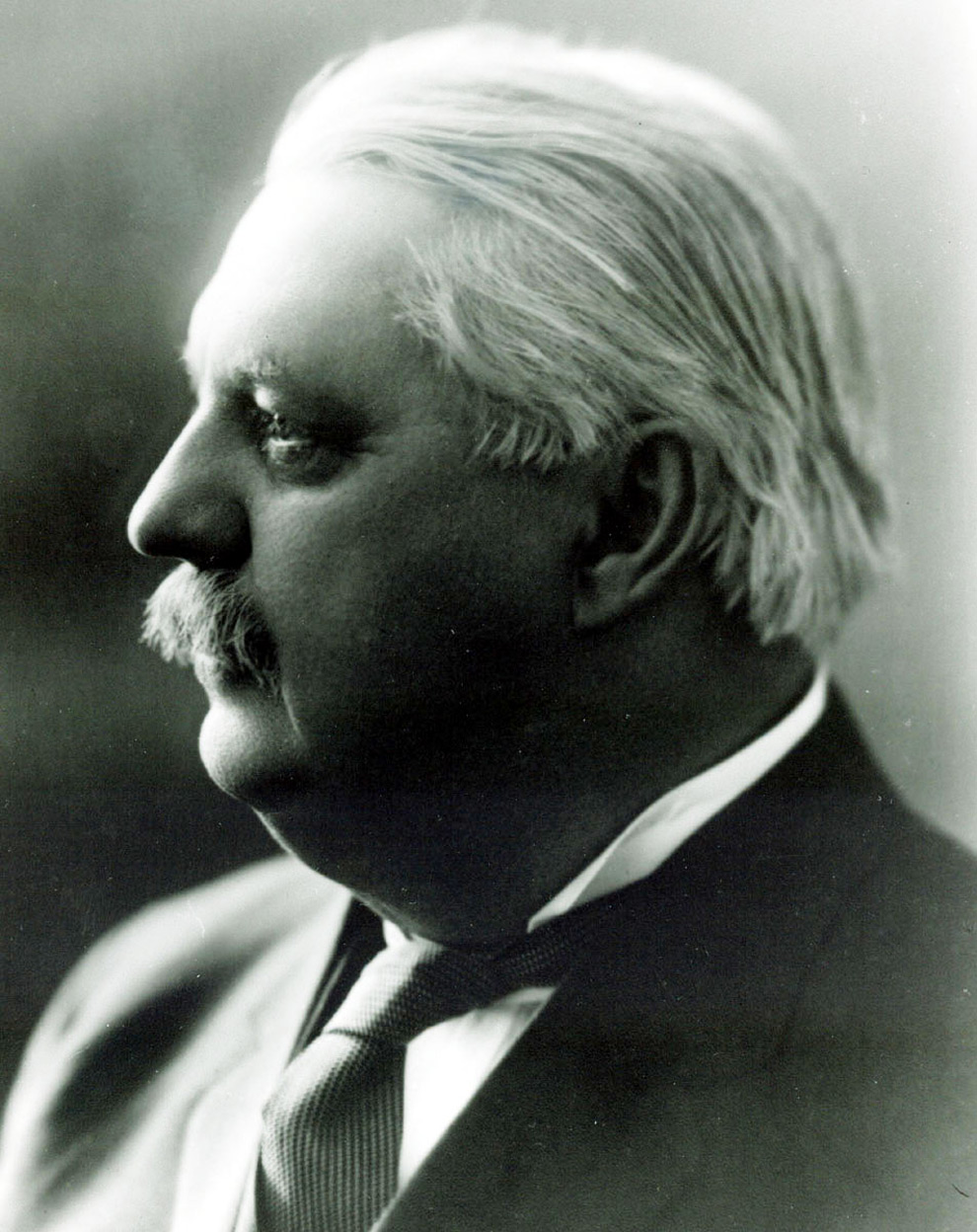
John H. Kibbey (c. 1913)

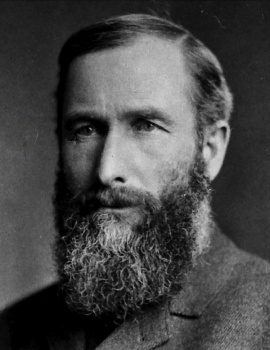
William John Murphy (c.1905)

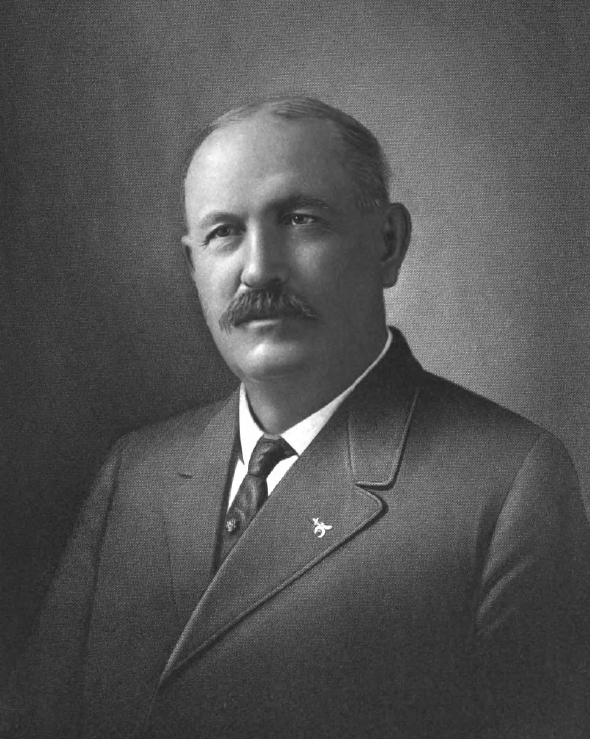
George Ulysses Young

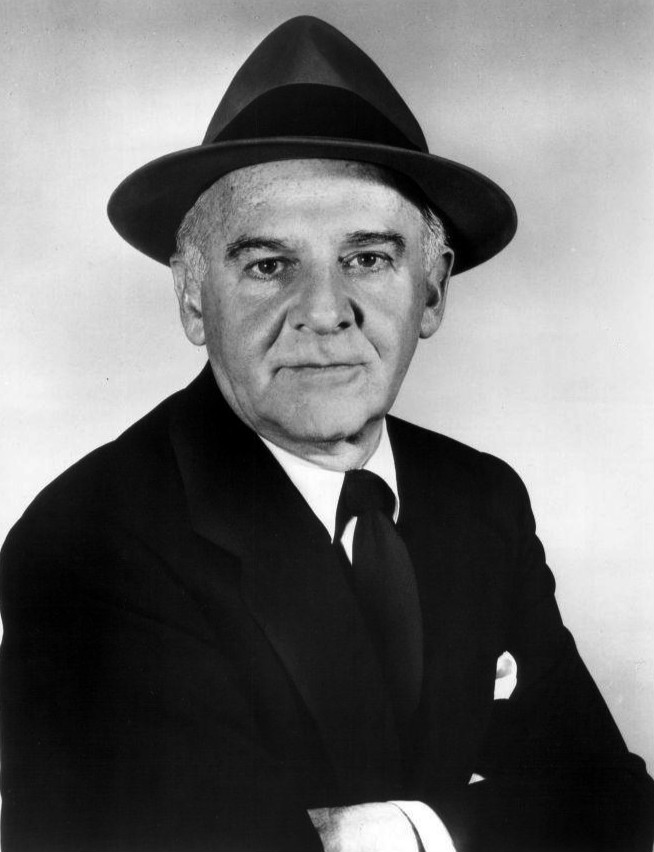
Walter Winchell (1960)

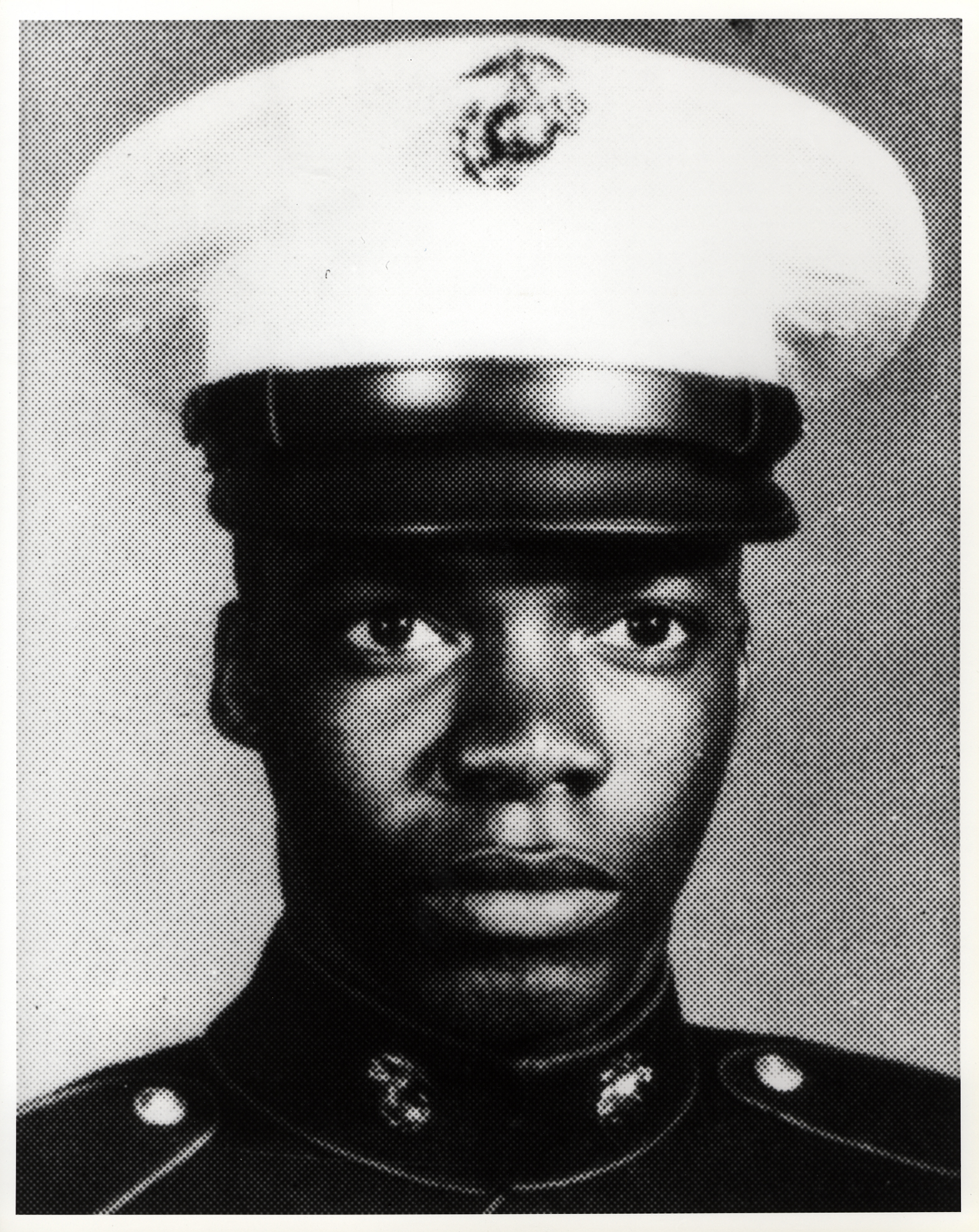
Oscar Palmer Austin (1969)

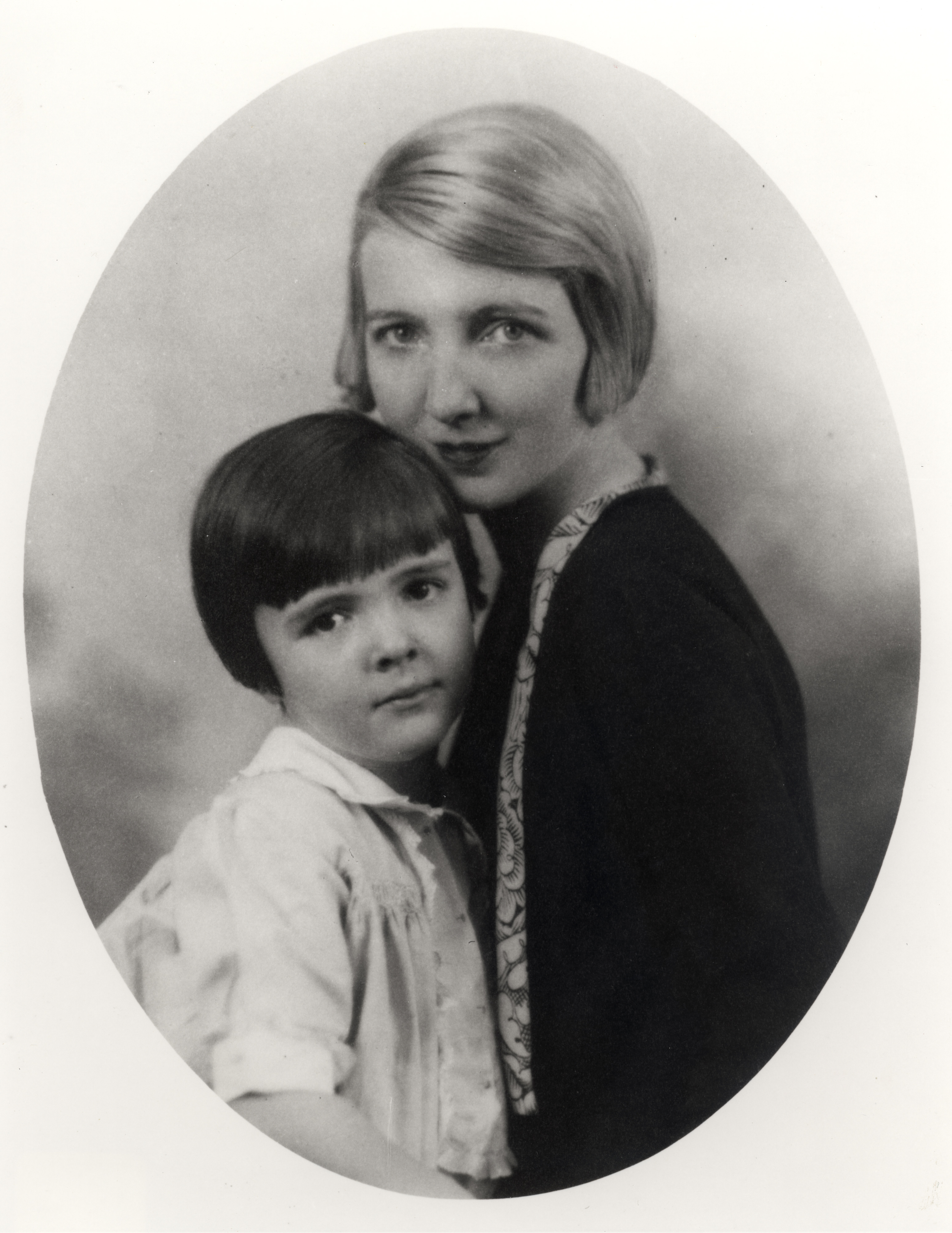
Edith Luckett Davis and daughter Nancy (1931)

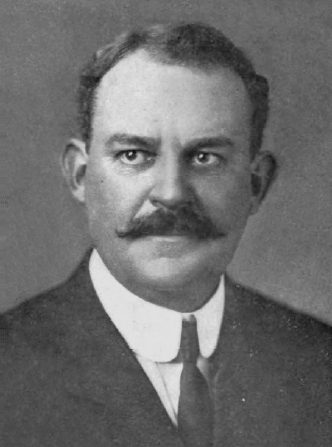
Dwight B. Heard

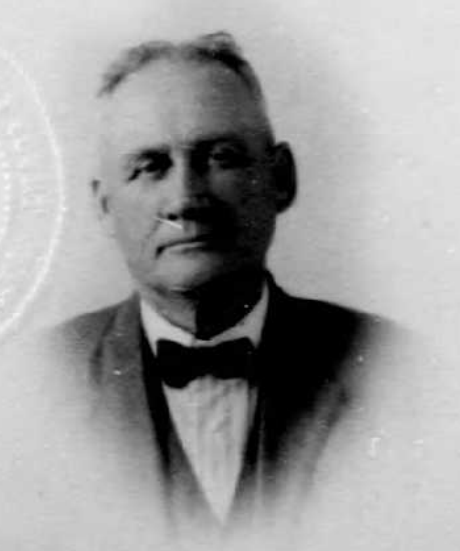
James Miller Creighton

Among the notable people interred in the cemetery are three Arizona Territory Governors, six Arizona State Governors, a Secretary of Arizona Territory, a U.S. Congressman, a Mayor of Phoenix, two recipients of the Medal of Honor, the founders of the cities of Glendale, Arizona and Chandler, race-car drivers, including the winner of the 1958 Indianapolis 500, journalists and the mother and step-father of a former First Lady.

- Frederick A. Tritle – Tritle served as the sixth Governor of the Arizona Territory from 1882 to 1885.
- Joseph Henry Kibbey – Kibbey served as the Associate Justice of the Arizona Territorial Supreme Court from 1889 to 1893 and as the 16th Governor of the Arizona Territory from 1905 to 1909. As governor, Kibbey was a leader in the effort to prevent Arizona and New Mexico territories from being combined into a single U.S. state.
- Richard Elihu Sloan – Sloan was the 17th and last Governor of the Arizona Territory. He served from 1909 to 1912.
- John Calhoun Phillips – Phillips was the third Governor of the State of Arizona (1929–1931).
- Richard F. Harless – was Representative for Arizona in several Congresses in the 1940s.
- Rawghlie Clement Stanford – Stanford was the fifth Governor of the State of Arizona (1937–1939).
- Robert Taylor Jones – Jones served as the sixth Governor of Arizona from 1939 to 1941.
- Sidney Preston Osborn – Osborn was the first Secretary of State of Arizona, and later the seventh Governor of Arizona and is, as of 2015, the only Governor of Arizona to be elected to four consecutive terms (Governors of Arizona served biennial terms without limits up until 1968, when it was changed to serve quadrennial terms, and changed again in 1992 to a limit of two terms at a time). Osborn is also the second native-born Governor of Arizona.
- Ernest William McFarland – McFarland served as a U.S. Senator (1941–1953), the tenth Governor of Arizona (1955–1959) and Arizona Supreme Court Justice (1968).
- Paul Jones Fannin – Fannin served as U.S. Senator from 1965 to 1977 and as the 11th Governor of Arizona from 1959 to 1965.
- George Ulysses Young – Young served as the Secretary of Arizona Territory (1909–1912) and as the 28th Mayor of Phoenix (1914–1916). As a businessman he invested in railroads and then transitioned his business interests to mining.
- Robert "Bob" Lee Stump – Stump was a U.S. Congressman who served for the Democratic Party and later switched to the Republican Party.
- Vernettie O. Ivy – Ivy served in the Arizona House of Representatives for six years and was a delegate to the Democratic National Convention in New York City in 1924. Her daughter Elizabeth McCreight Hutchison is buried with her.
- Wing Foon Ong – Ong, born in Guangdong, China to a Chinese-American father and Chinese mother. His family later resided in the mainland United States where he became the first Chinese-American to be elected to a state House (twice) in the United States and later to the Arizona Senate.
- Jack Walters – In 1872, Walters became the first District Attorney in Maricopa County, Arizona. That same year he and his partner Johnny George had a new two-story adobe building built which served as a restaurant, saloon and hotel. This was the first two-story building to be erected in Phoenix.
- Lorna Elizabeth Lockwood – Lockwood served as Chief Justice of the Arizona Supreme Court from 1965 to 1966 and again from 1970 to 1971. She was the first woman to become Chief Justice of a state supreme court.
- John Taylor Dunlap – Dr. Dunlap served as Mayor of Phoenix from December 9, 1904, to May 4, 1905. Dunlap Avenue in Phoenix is named after him.
- John Nicholas Udall – Udall (a.k.a. Nick Udall) served as the mayor of Phoenix from 1948 to 1952.
- Madge E. Copeland – Copeland opened the first beauty parlor for African-American women in Phoenix and went on to become the first African-American appointed as Deputy Maricopa County Recorder in 1947, which at the time was the highest political office any African American had held in Arizona. She served as Deputy County Recorder until she retired in 1961. She was active in the fight against segregation in Arizona and was an important leader in the Democratic Party.
- Clinton Campbell – Campbell was a "local prominent builder" who worked in Phoenix. Several of his works have survived and are listed on the U.S. National Register of Historic Places.
- Alexander John Chandler – Dr. Chandler was the first veterinary surgeon in Arizona Territory. He was also the founder of the City of Chandler.
- Burguess Almon Hadsell – Hadsell and William J. Murphy, promoted the temperance colony of Glendale, Arizona in the western Salt River Valley.
- George Henry Nicholas Luhrs Sr – Luhrs SR., was a pioneer Phoenix hotel man, builder and capitalist. He died in his apartment in the Luhrs Hotel.
- John Britt Montgomery – Montgomery was an early Phoenix pioneer who owned 280 acres of farmland. He subdivided his holdings and sold it to new Settlers, creating a Phoenix neighborhood known as the Montgomery addition. In 1890, Montgomery ran for sheriff and won the election with 60% of the vote.
- William John Murphy – Murphy was the founder of the City of Glendale, Arizona and of the town of Peoria, Arizona.
- Dr. James Collier Norton – Dr. Norton and his wife Clara Tufts moved to Phoenix from Iowa and served as the territorial veterinarian.
- William R. Norton – Norton founded the Sunnyslope subdivision of Phoenix and designed the Carnegie Library, the city's first library, and the Gila County Courthouse in Globe, Arizona.
- Floyd Holmes Sine – Sine was a pioneer in Glendale, Arizona who in 1910, expanded the water system by adding a storage tank and supply lines and sold the water back to the city in 1915. He built the Sine Building in 1912, in Glendale.
- Eleanor Ragsdale – Mrs. Ragsdale was the wife of Lincoln Johnson Ragsdale. She became a leading figure in Phoenix's Civil Rights Movement from the 1940s to the 1960s. By challenging segregation and working through civil rights organizations, she exerted a direct impact on social relations in the Phoenix area, and helped to integrate the city and state.
- Lincoln Johnson Ragsdale Sr. – Dr. Ragsdale was a former Tuskegee Airman who became a Civil Rights leader in Phoenix.
- Jean Maddock Clark – Clark was a leader, teacher and mentor to hundreds of Arizona Girl Scouts and students. She founded Girl Scout troops in many of the communities in which she taught school. In 1930, Clark became was the first Arizona woman to be awarded the Golden Eagle, the highest award from the Girl Scouts of the USA. She was the first trained Camp Director for Arizona's Girl Scout Council and served in that capacity for 19 years. From 1937 through 1977, Clark served as a troop leader in Phoenix.
- James Miller Creighton – Creighton was an architect who practiced in Phoenix from the 1880s to the 1920s. He is considered to be one of Arizona's first architects.
- Ayra E. Hackett – Mrs. Hackett was the wife of Winston C. Hackett, the first African-American physician in Phoenix. In 1919, she founded The Arizona Gleam, the first African-American newspaper in Phoenix, making her the first African-American woman to own a newspaper in Phoenix.
- Dr. Winston C. Hackett – Hackett was the first African-American physician in Arizona. He founded the Booker T. Washington Memorial Hospital, the first African-American hospital in Phoenix.
- Dwight Bancroft Heard – Heard was one of the largest landowners in the Salt lake Valley in Arizona. He was also the president of the Arizona Cotton Growers' Association. He owned the Arizona Republican, a newspaper renamed the Arizona Republic. Heard, together with his wife Maie, founded the Heard Museum.
- Maie Bartlett Heard – Mrs. Heard was an Arizona-based collector and philanthropist who co-founded, with her husband Dwight Bancroft Heard, the Heard Museum of Native American art.
- John Cromwell Lincoln – Lincoln was an inventor and businessman who established the Lincoln Electric and the Bagdad Mine in Arizona. He donated money for the construction of a hospital in the Sunnyslope section of Phoenix. The hospital was named the John C. Lincoln Hospital in his honor. In 1998, he was posthumously inducted into the American Mining Hall of Fame.
- Dea Hong Toy – Toy was born in China and moved to Phoenix in 1923. He was a successful merchant. Toy was among those in the Asian community of Phoenix who in 1938 founded the Chinese Chamber of Commerce to protect and promote their businesses.
- Dr. Lowell Cheatham Wormley – Wormley was born in Washington, D.C., and studied medicine at Howard University Medical School. When he arrived in Arizona in the mid-1940s, he was one of only three African-American doctors in Phoenix. He was on the staff of both St. Joseph's and Good Samaritan hospitals. He opened his own practice in 1946 in the Midtown Medical Building and practiced there until the early 1980s. His house is known as the Dr. Lowell Wormley House and is listed in the Phoenix Historic Property Register.
- Oscar Palmer Austin – Austin was a United States Marine who in 1969, was posthumously awarded the Medal of Honor for his actions in the Vietnam War.
- Thomas Carl Reed – Reed was a 19 year old African-American who was killed during the Korean War, and who was denied a proper burial in the Greenwood Cemetery because of the color of his skin. This incident led to the protest of groups involved in the Civil Rights Movement which culminated in a change of the burial policy of the cemetery.
- Philip Edward Tovrea Jr. Tovrea was a U.S. Army Air Forces World War II ace who was awarded the Silver Star Medal for gallantry and the Distinguished Flying Cross for extraordinary achievement for participating in aerial flight while serving as a P-38 Fighter Pilot of the 27th Fighter Squadron. He is credited with shooting down 8 enemy aircraft in aerial combat.
- Andrew J. Weaher – Weaher (a.k.a. Weaber) was an American soldier in the U.S. Army who was awarded the Medal of Honor in 1868, after engaging the Native-American tribe, the Apaches in the Black Mountains of Arizona.
- Also, there are 20 known Confederate Army soldiers buried in Greenwood
- Winstona Hackett Aldridge – Mrs. Hackett Aldridge was the daughter of Dr. Winston Hackett one of the first African-American doctor in Phoenix. She was a founding member of the Phoenix Chapter of The Links Inc., and a Diamond Soror with 75 years of service in the Alpha Kappa Alpha sorority. The house where she and her husband Aubrey Aldridge lived is known as the "Winstona Aldridge House". It was designated as a landmark with Historic Preservation-Landmark (HP-L) overlay zoning. It is listed in the Phoenix Historic Property Register.
- Bobby Ball – Race car driver
- Don Bolles – Bolles (birth name: Donald Fifield Bolles) was an American investigative reporter whose murder in a car bombing has been linked to the Mafia.
- William "Haze" Hazelton Burch – On February 5, 1925, Burch became the first Phoenix Police Officer to be killed in the line of duty.
- Jimmy Bryan – Bryan was a race-car driver who won the 1958 Indianapolis 500.
- Helena Carroll – film, television and stage actress
- Loyal and Edith Davis – Loyal was a prominent neurosurgeon. Edith Luckett Davis, a former actress and wife of Loyal, was the mother of the former First Lady Nancy Reagan.
- Harold "Habe" F. Haberling – Haberling was a competitor in the NASCAR Sportsman Modified Series who died in 1961, in an accident while practicing for the 250 mile race in Daytona.
- Lee Jew – Jew was a Chinese merchant who owned the Lee Jew Market located at 1501 East Washington Street. He was a leader in the Chinese community of Phoenix.
- Art Nehf – American baseball pitcher
- Captain John Daniel "Jack" Sullivan – Capt. Sullivan. from Squad 1, became the first fatality of the Phoenix Fire Department on December 9, 1929. While responding to a call, Squad 1 and Engine 2 crashed into each other at 14th and Van Buren streets. Captain Jack Sullivan of the Squad was killed immediately
- Oliver Calvin Thompson – Thompson was a civil engineer whose house is perhaps the best and most often seen example of turn-of-the-century brick Colonial Revival housing.
- Edward Ambrosio Tovrea – Tovrea, known as the "Cattle Baron," founded a Phoenix packing house west of 48th Street and Van Buren in 1919, to support his growing beef operations. The Tovrea Land and Cattle Co.. His business had grown to include nearly 40,000 head of cattle which were secured by 200 acres of cattle pens, thereby making it the world's largest feedlot.
- Walter Winchell – Winchell was a newspaper columnist who is credited with inventing the gossip column.
- Walter Emanuel Laveen Sr. – Laveen was crucial in the development of Laveen, Arizona. Him and his family opened the first general store in the area, later, the Laveen's would donate land adjacent to their store for a school that was built in 1913. In 1915, the community was named "Laveen"

== Graves ==
Historic Greenwood/Memory Lawn Mortuary & Cemetery

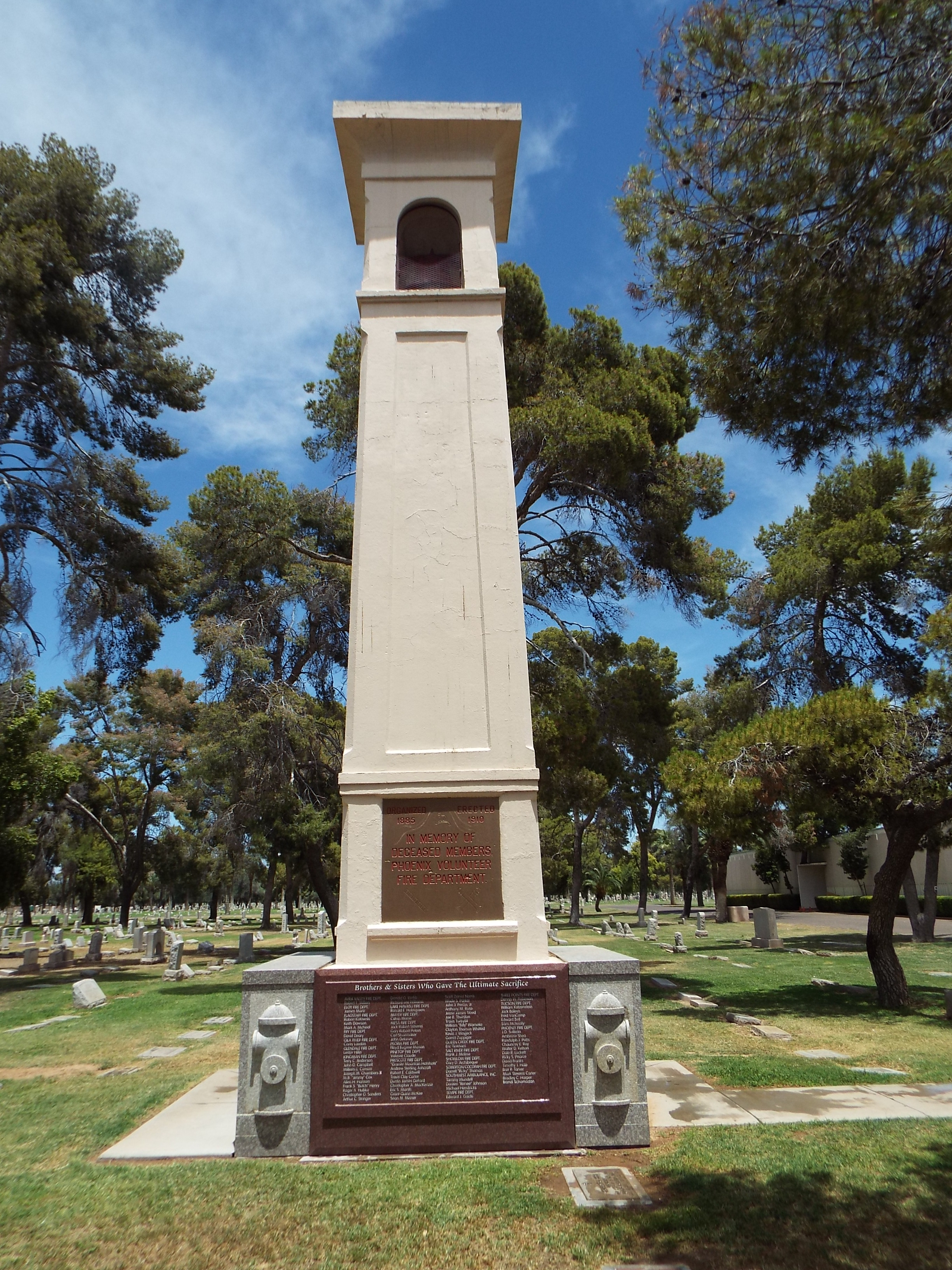
Phoenix Volunteer Firefighters Monument (1910)

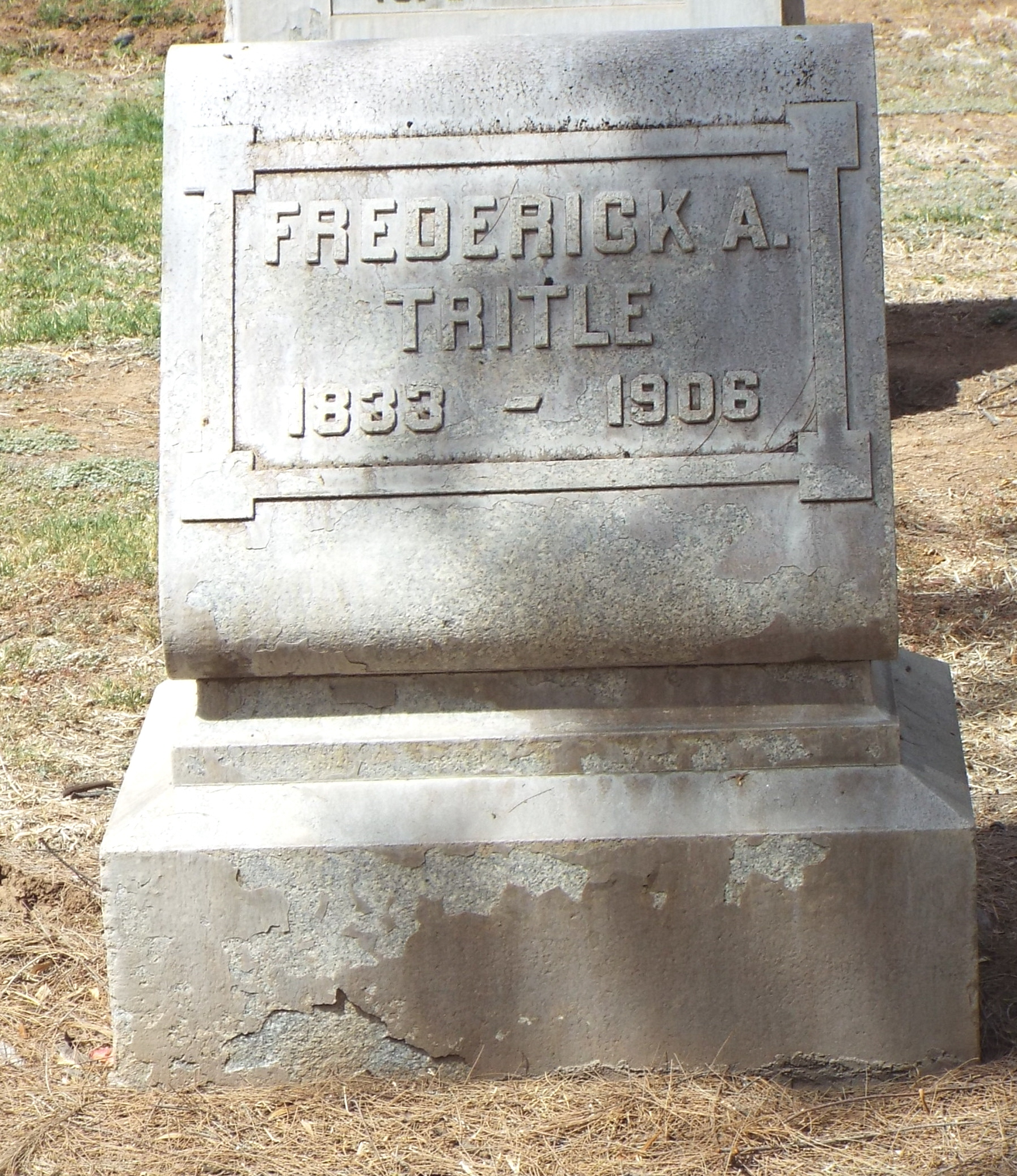
Grave-site of Frederick A. Tritle (1833–1906).

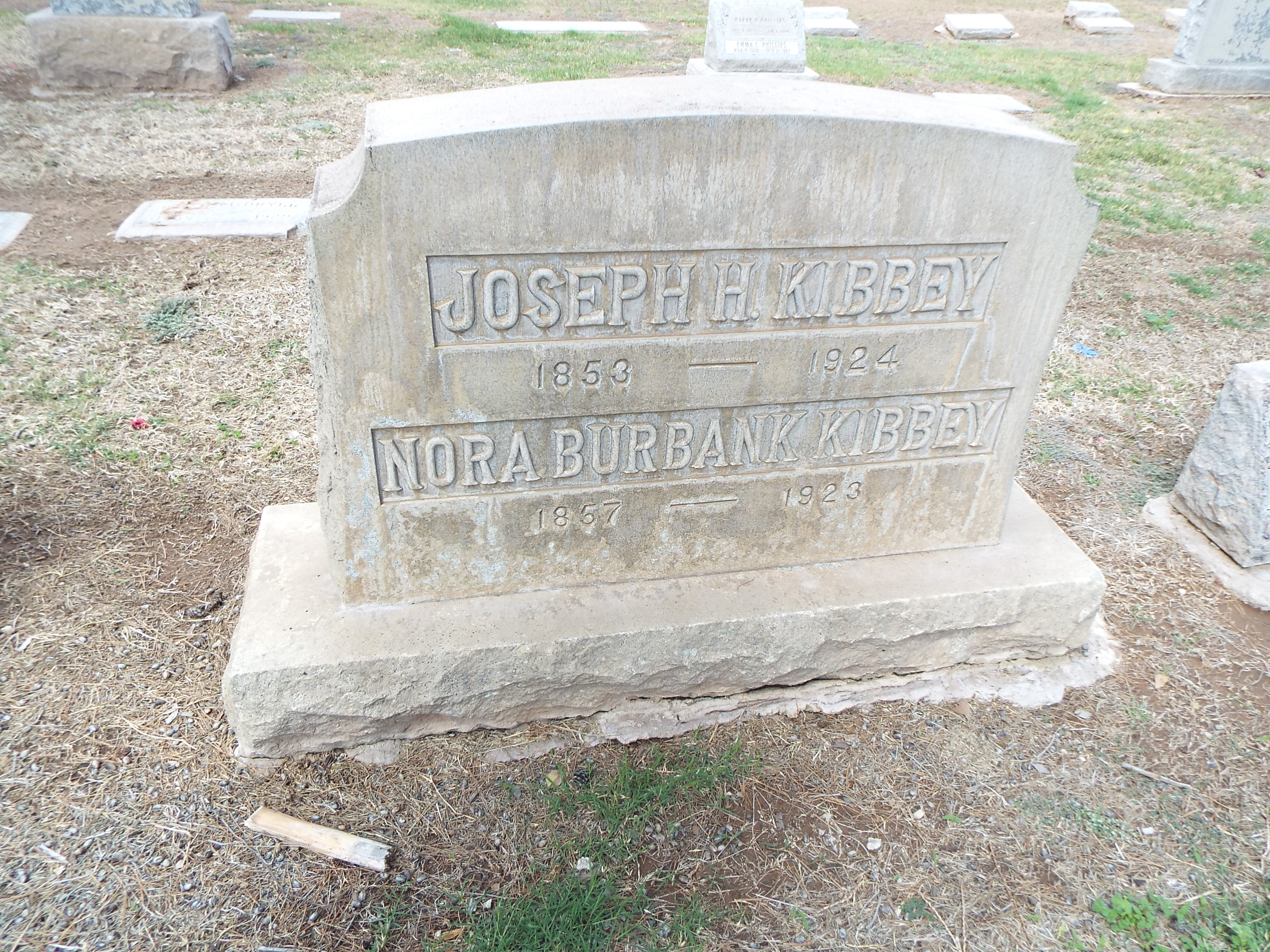
Grave-site of Joseph H. Kibbey (1853–1924) and Nora Burbank Kibbey (1867–1923).

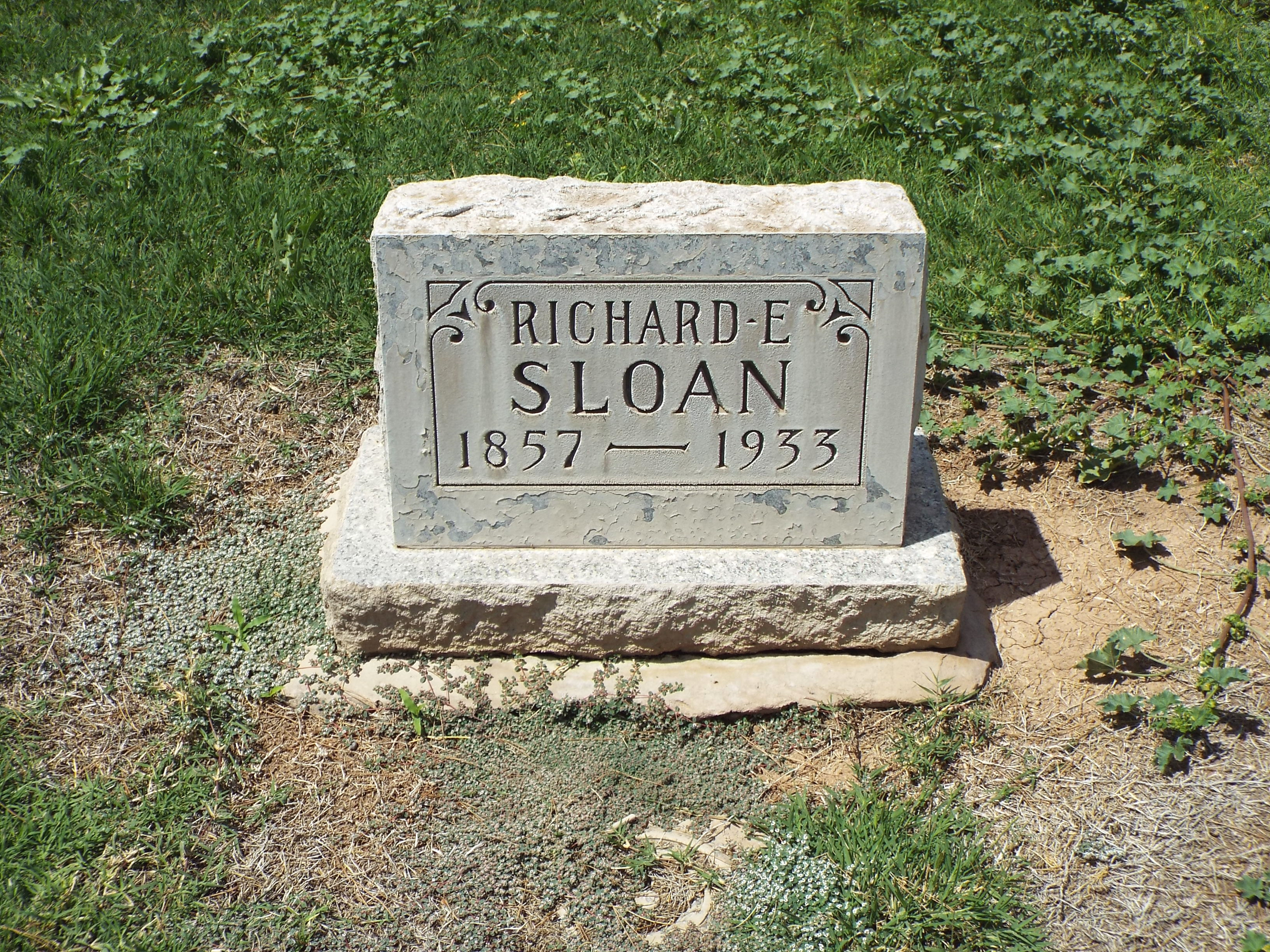
Grave-site of Richard Elihu Sloan (1857–1933).

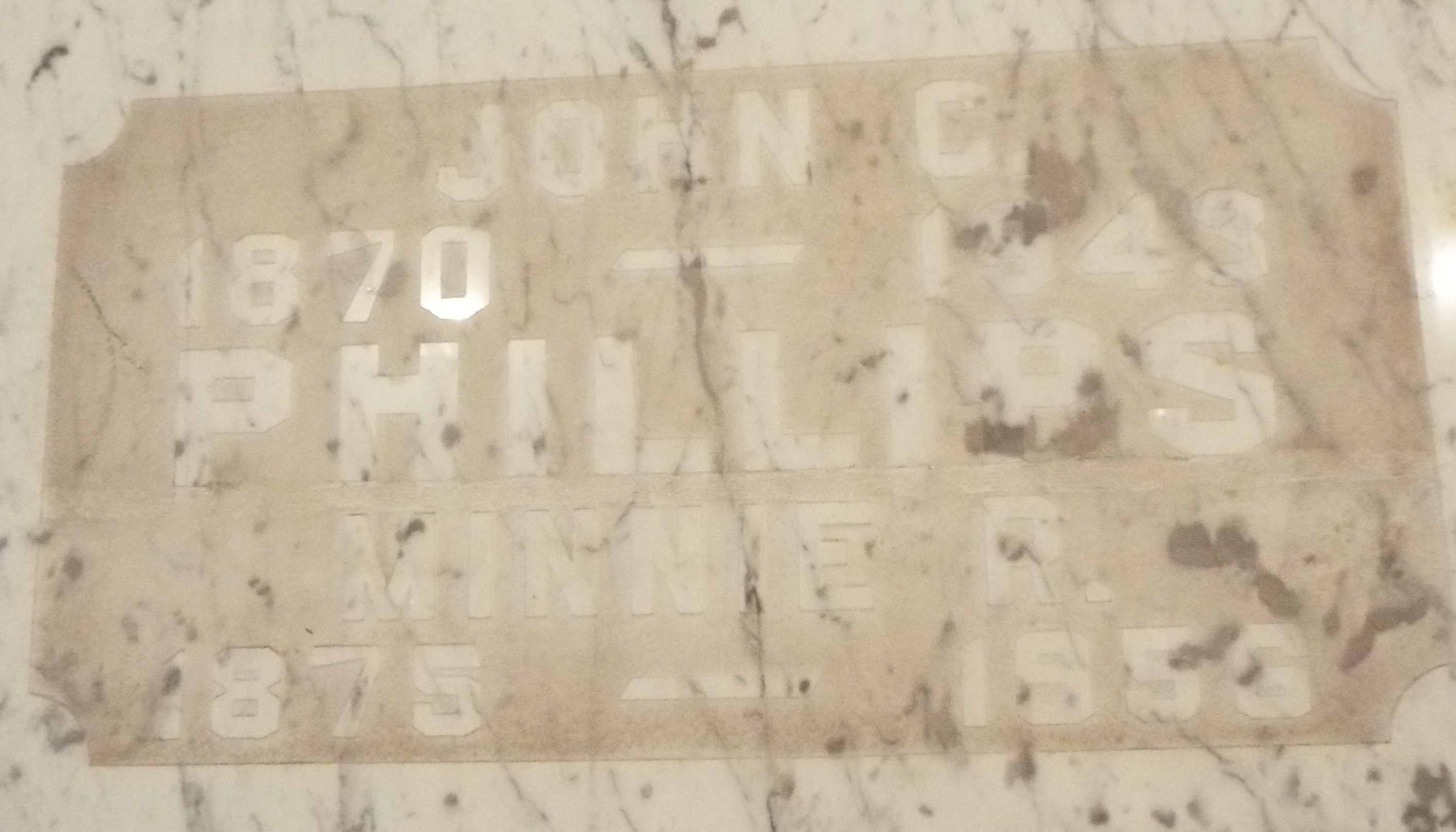
Crypt of John Calhoun Phillips (1870–1943) and his wife Minnie Phillips (1875–1956).

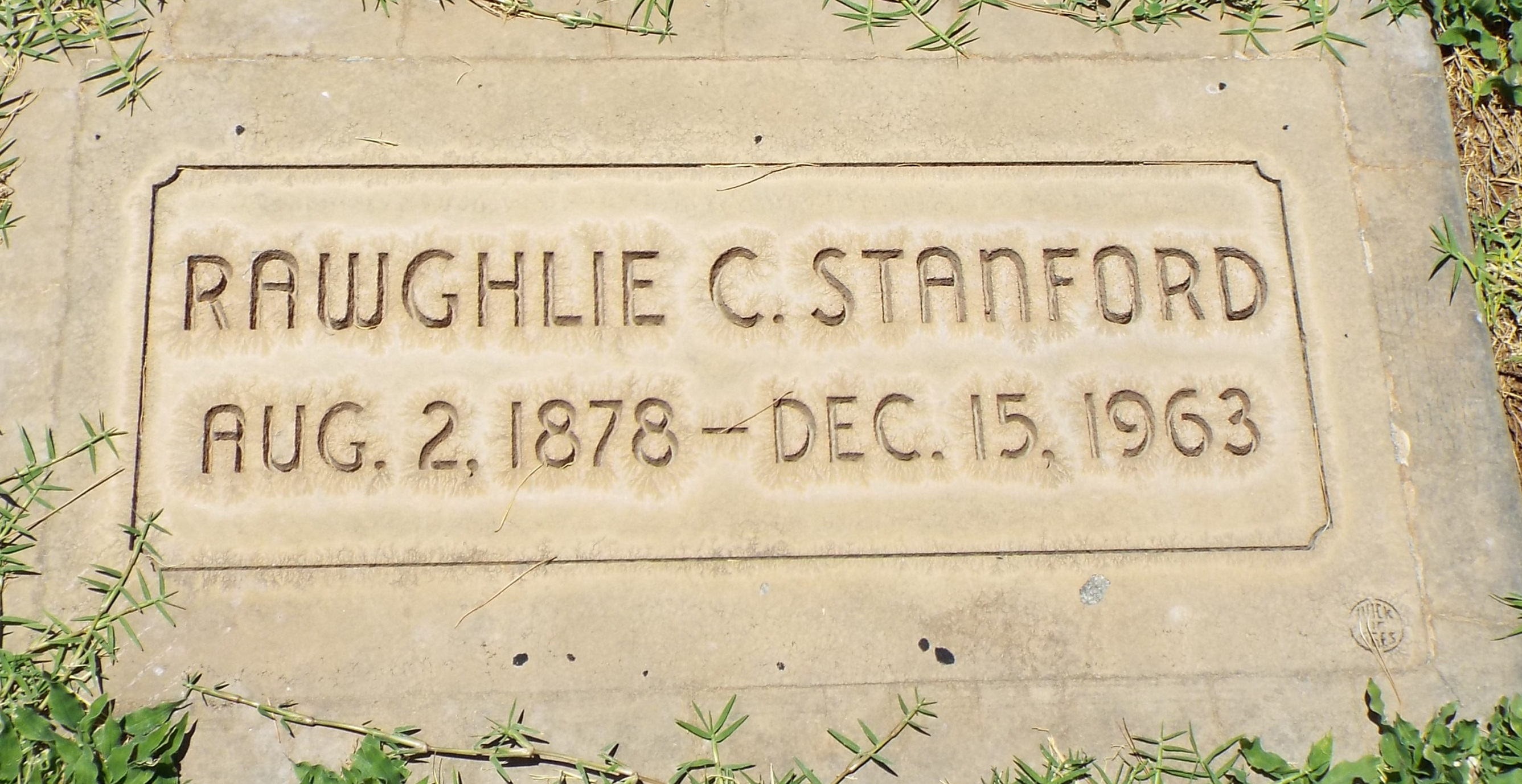
Grave-site of Rawghlie Clement Stanford (1879–1963).

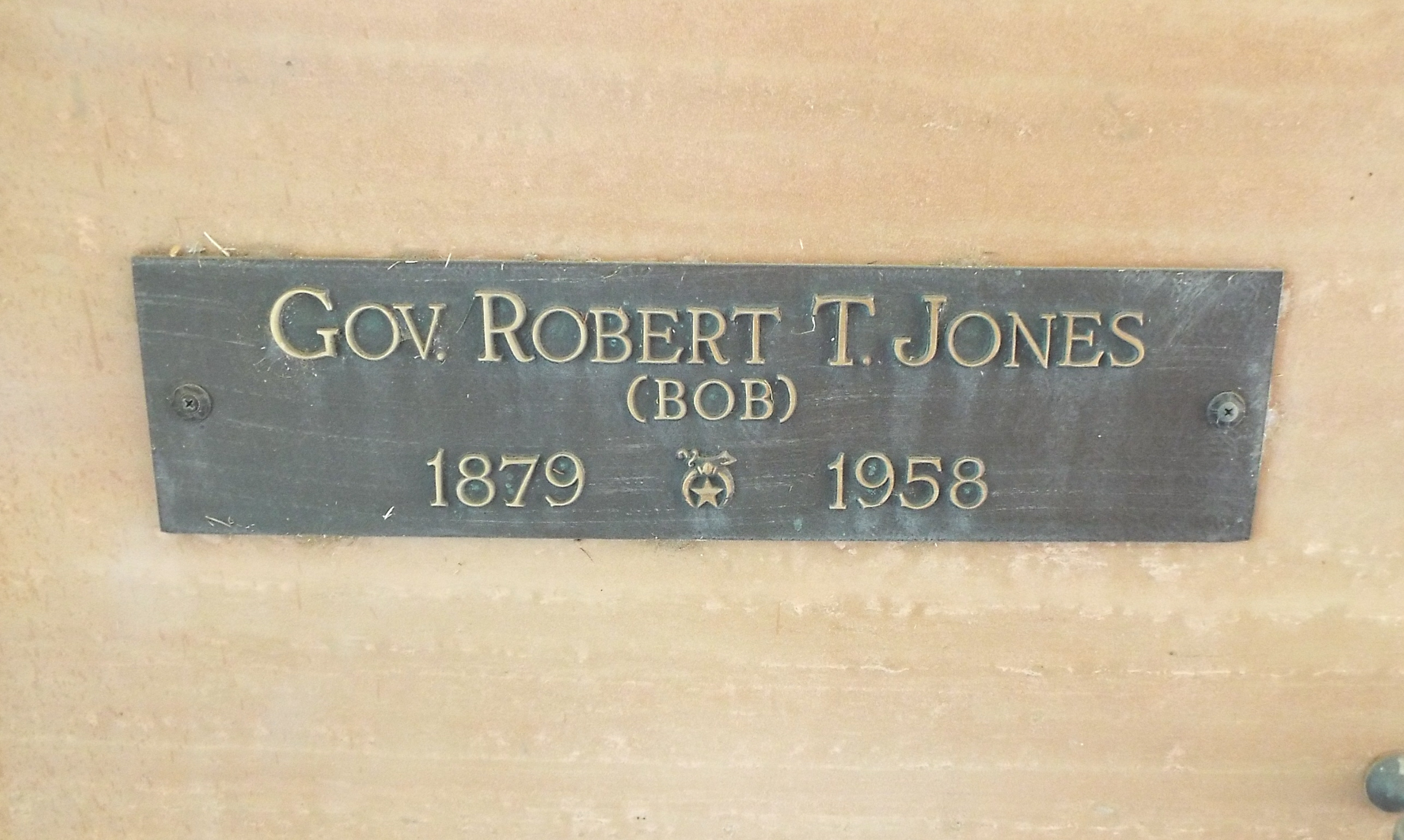
Crypt of Robert "Bob" Taylor Jones (1884–1958).

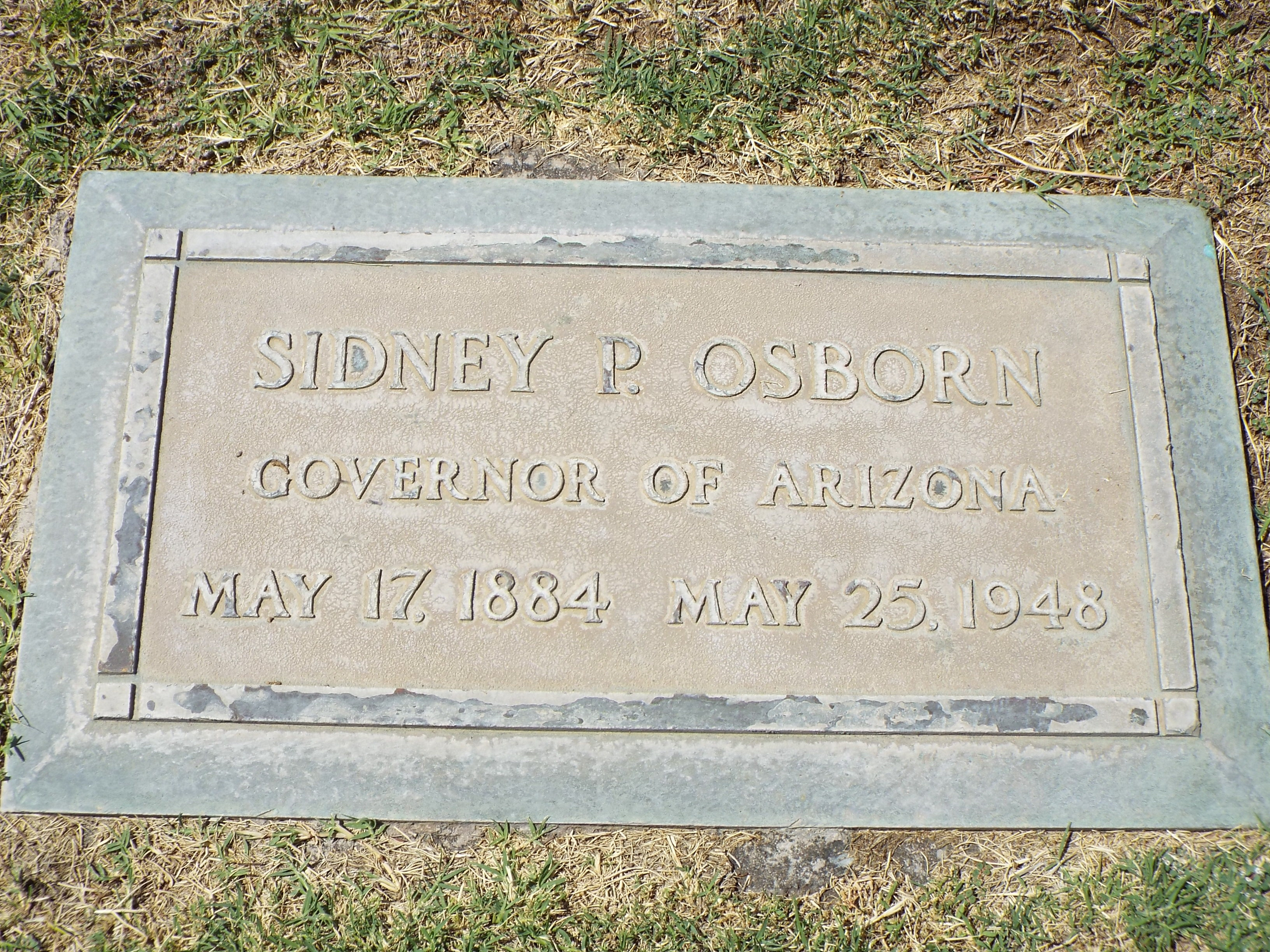
Grave-site of Sidney Preston Osborn (1884–1948).

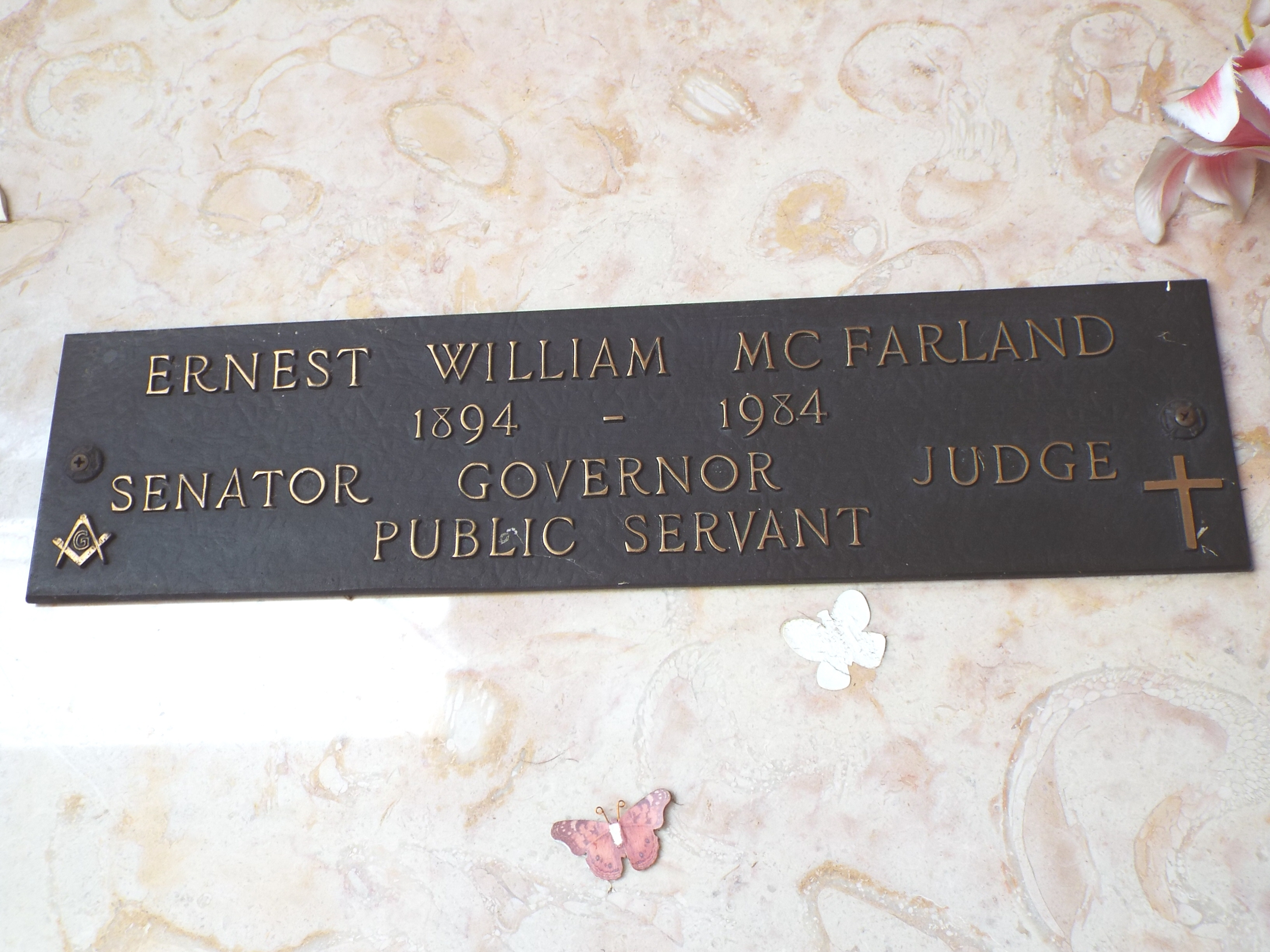
Crypt of Ernest William McFarland (1894–1984).

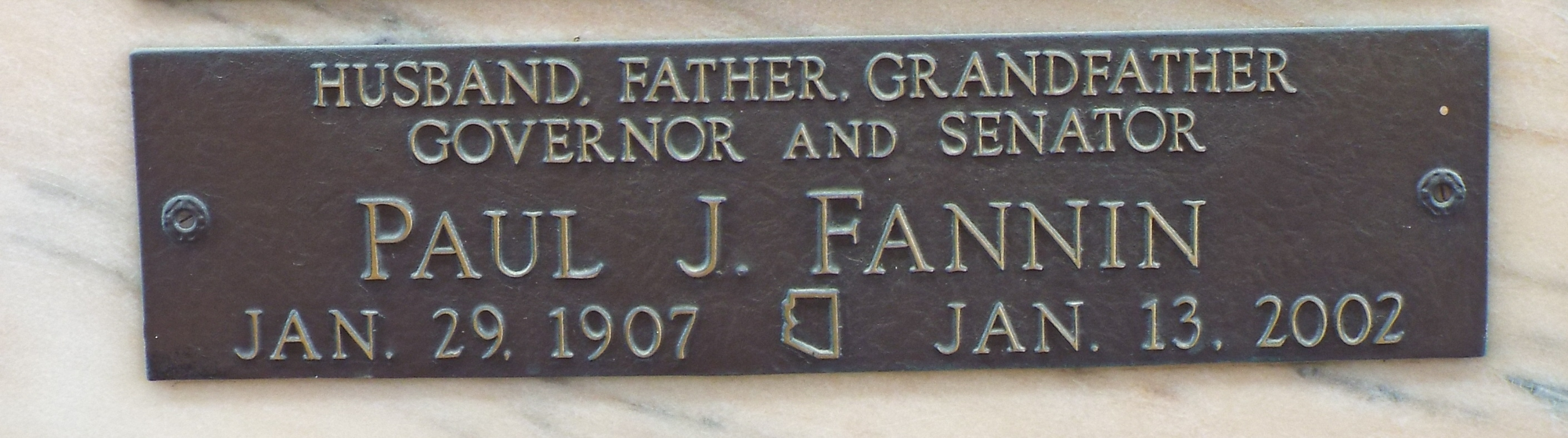
Crypt of Paul Jones Fannin (1907–2002).

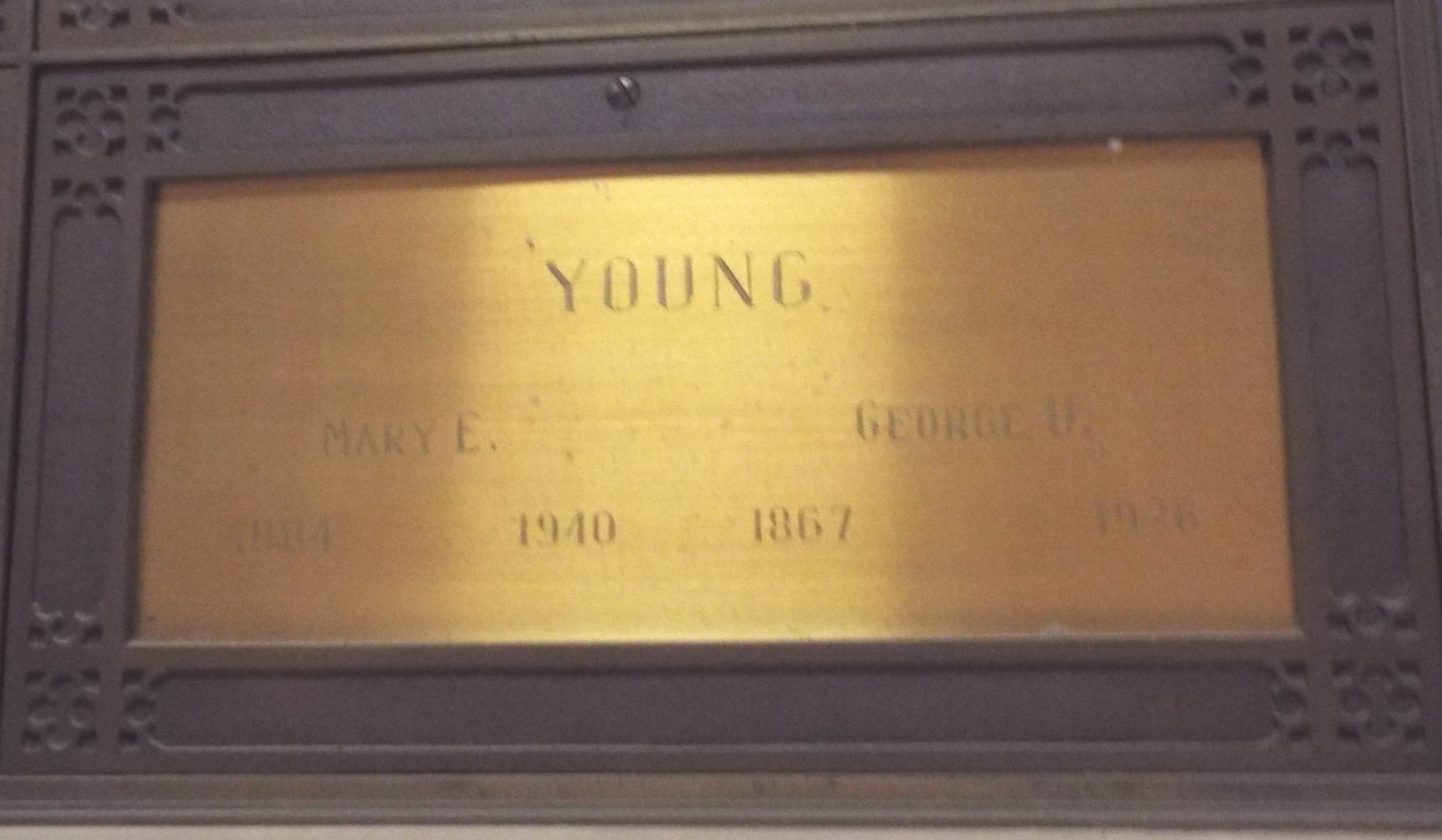
Crypt containing the cremated remains of George Ulysses Young (1867–1926) and his wife Mary E. Young (1884–1940).

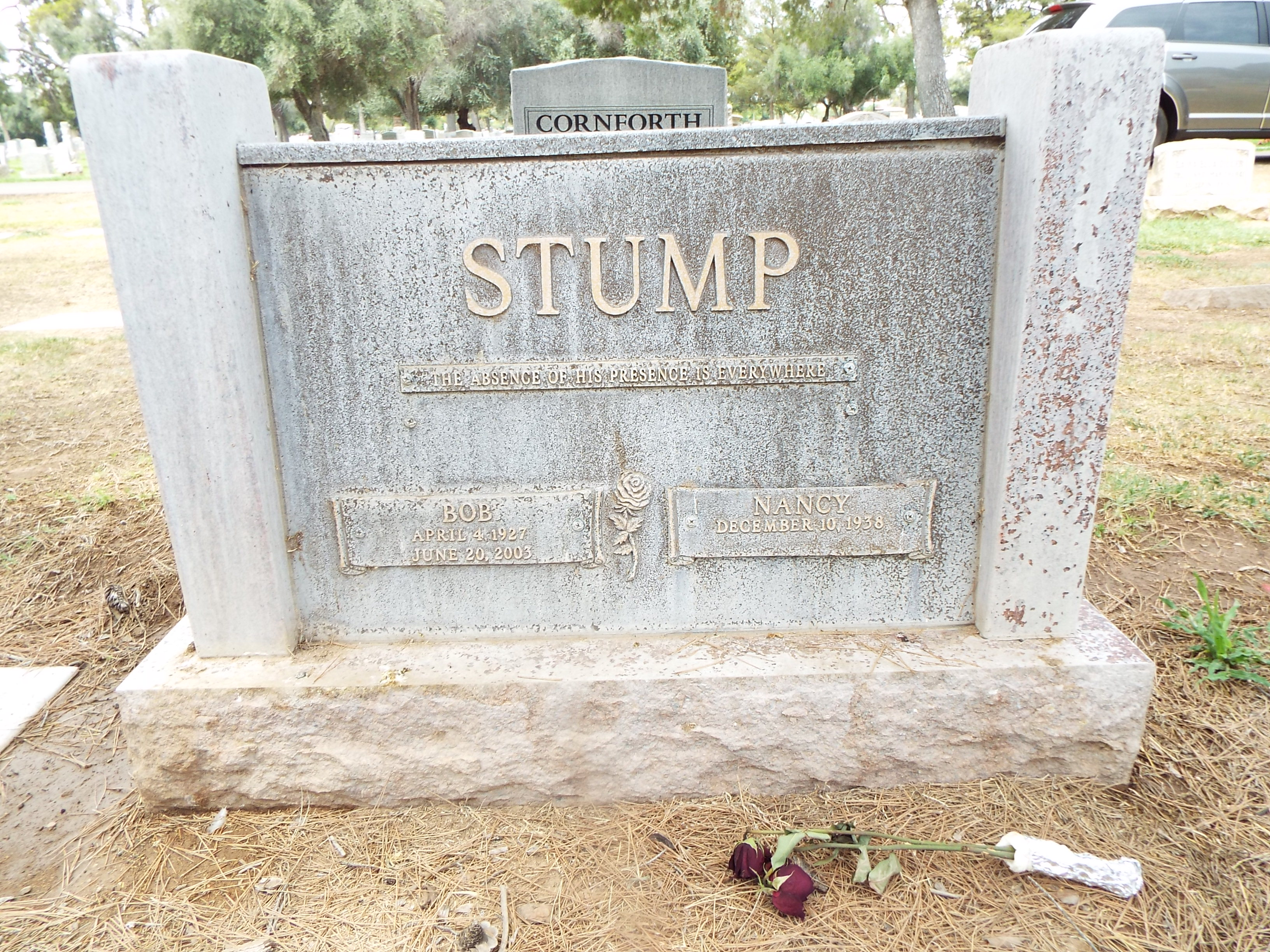
Grave-site of Robert "Bob" Lee Stump (1927–2003) and Nancy Stump (1938–2019).

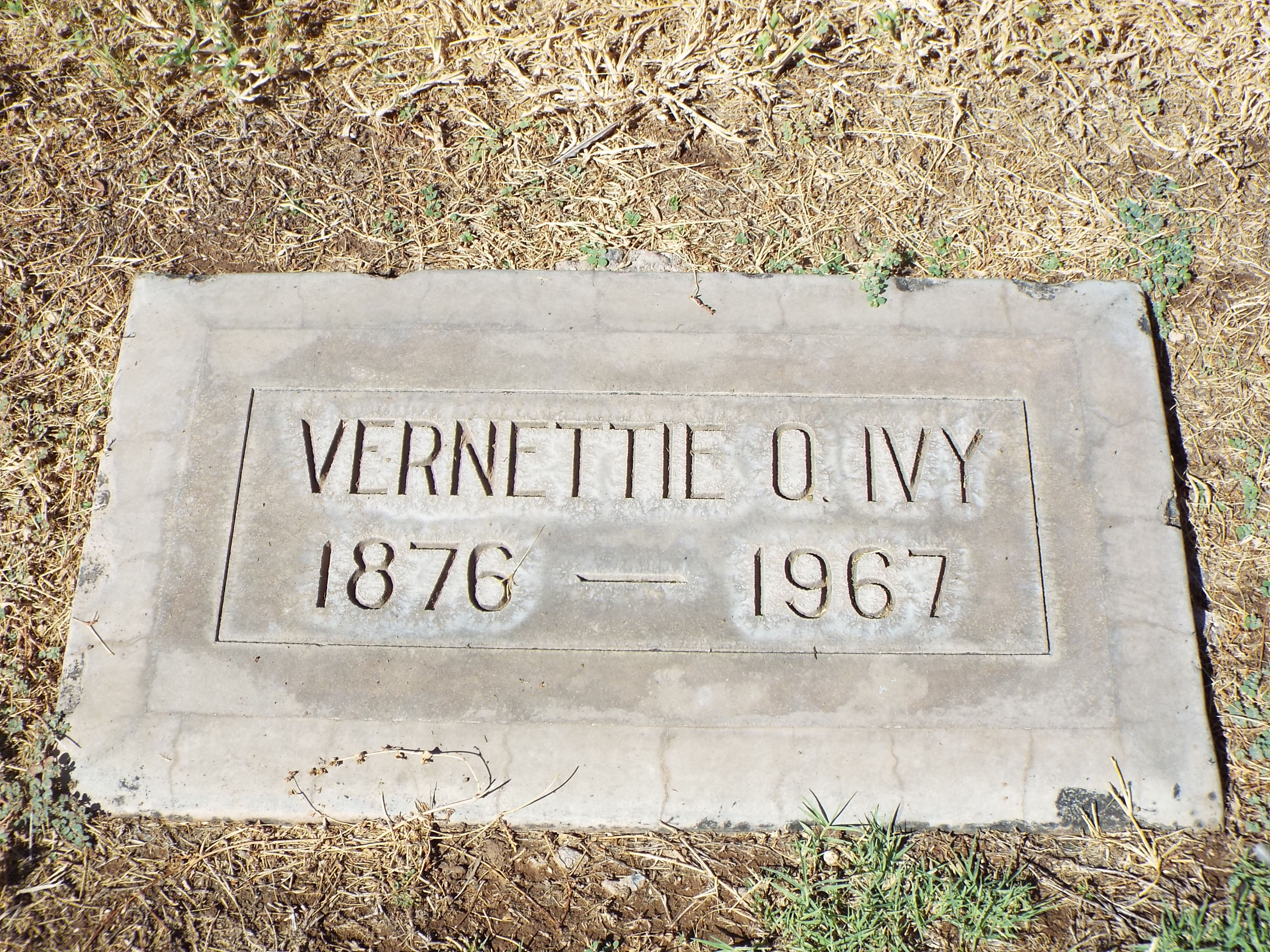
Grave-site of Vernettie O. Ivy (1876–1967).

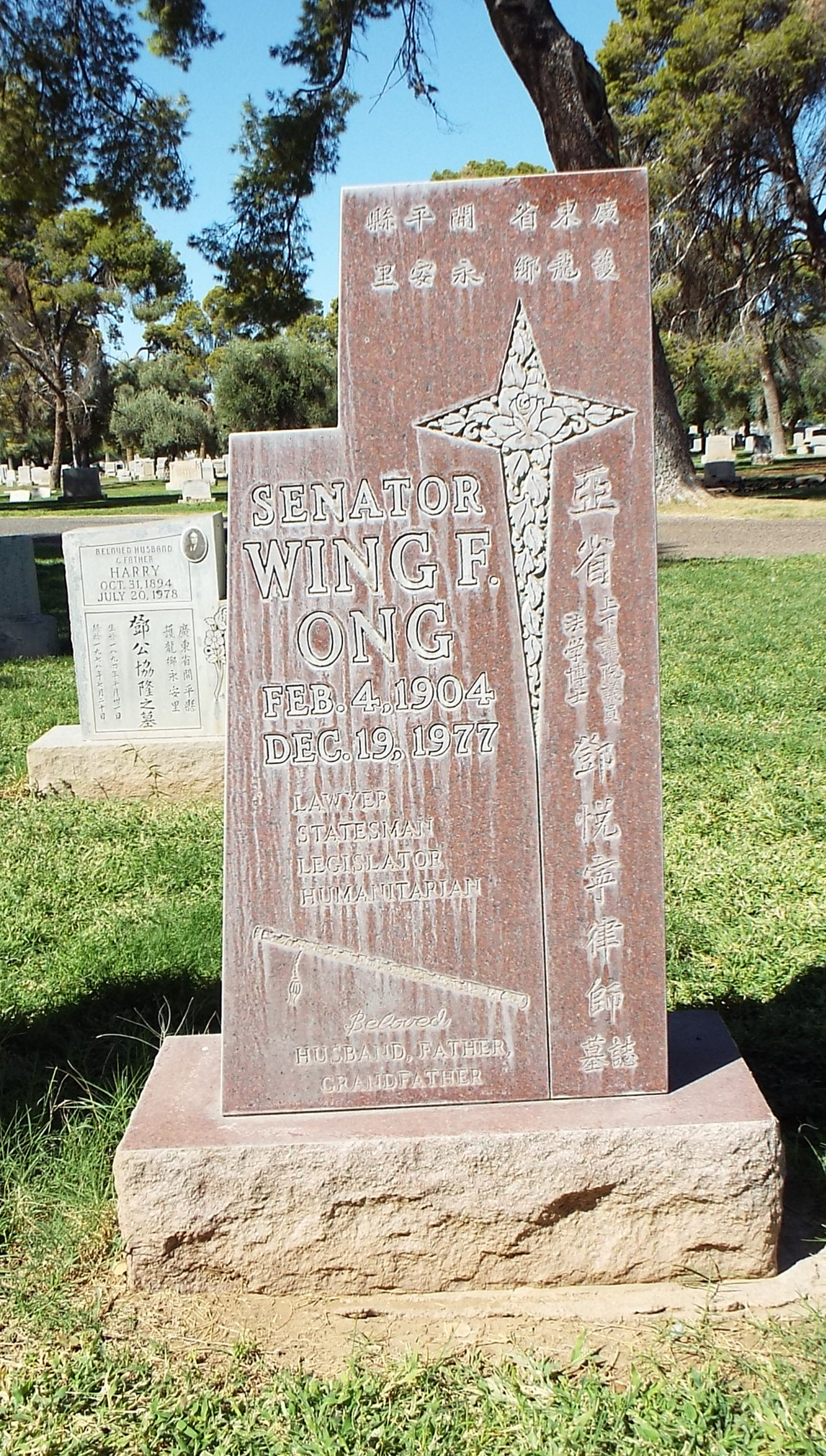
Grave-site of Wing Foon Ong (1904–1977).

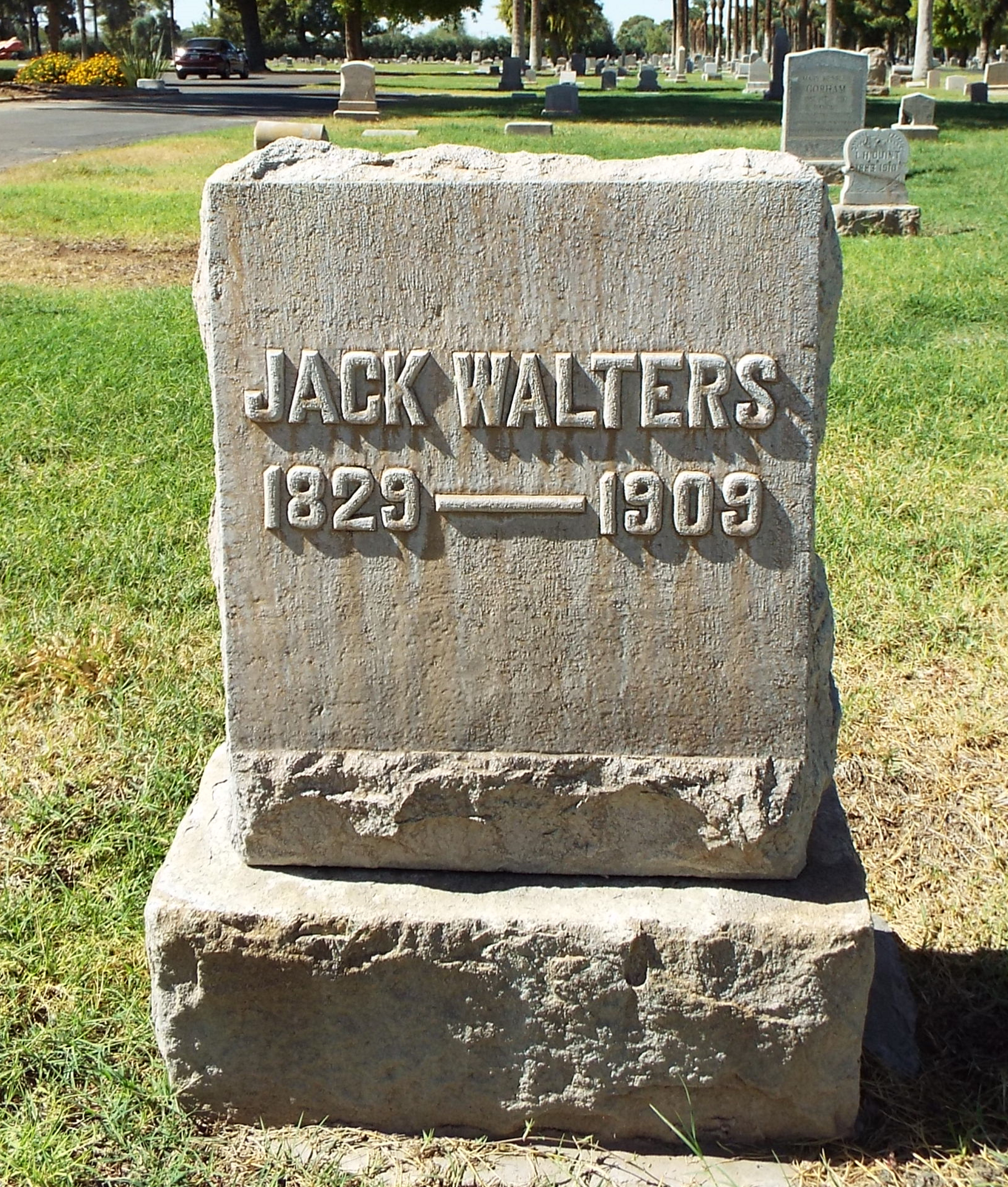
Grave-site of Jack Walters (1829–1909).

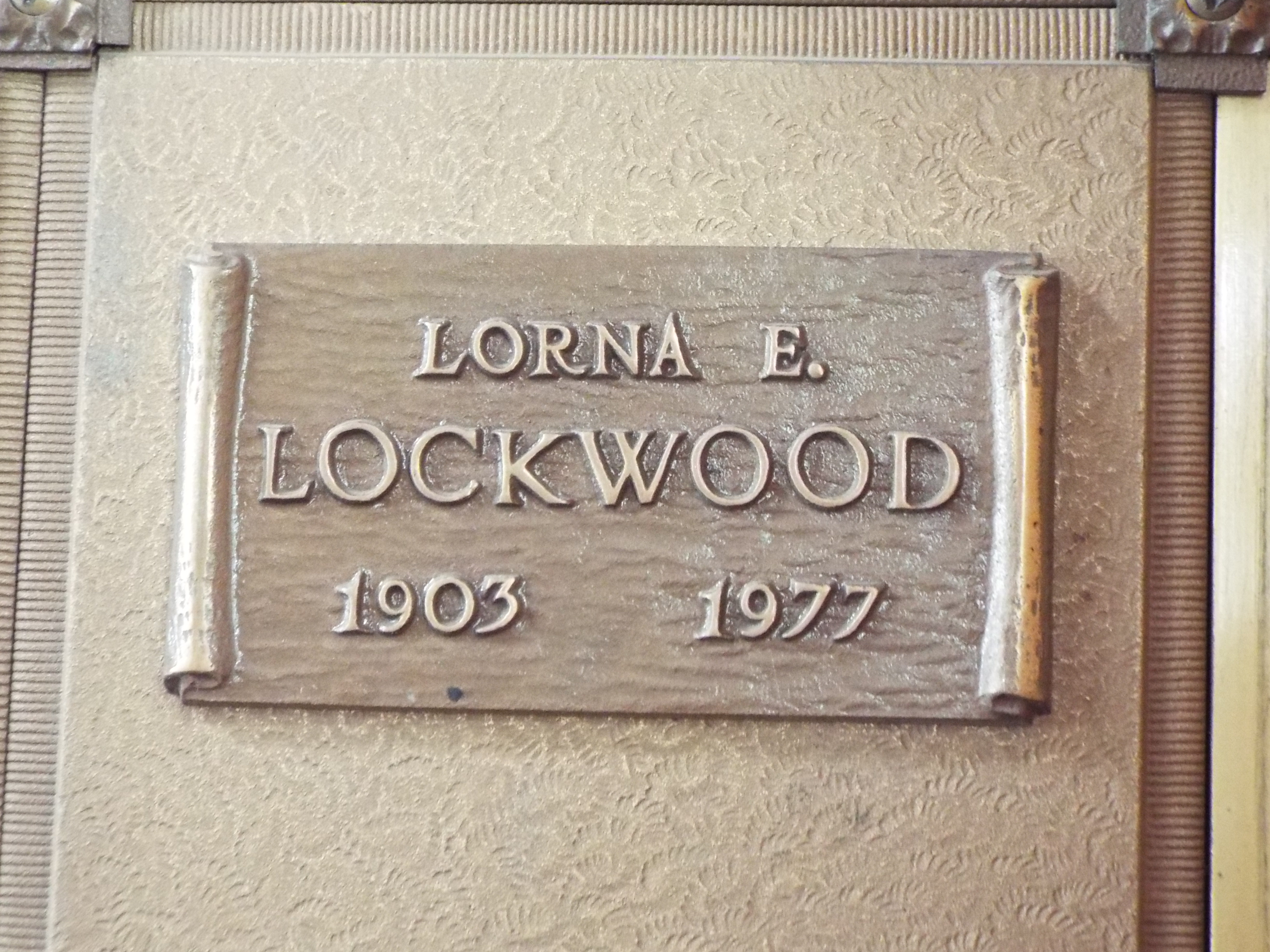
Crypt of Lorna Elizabeth Lockwood (1903–1977).

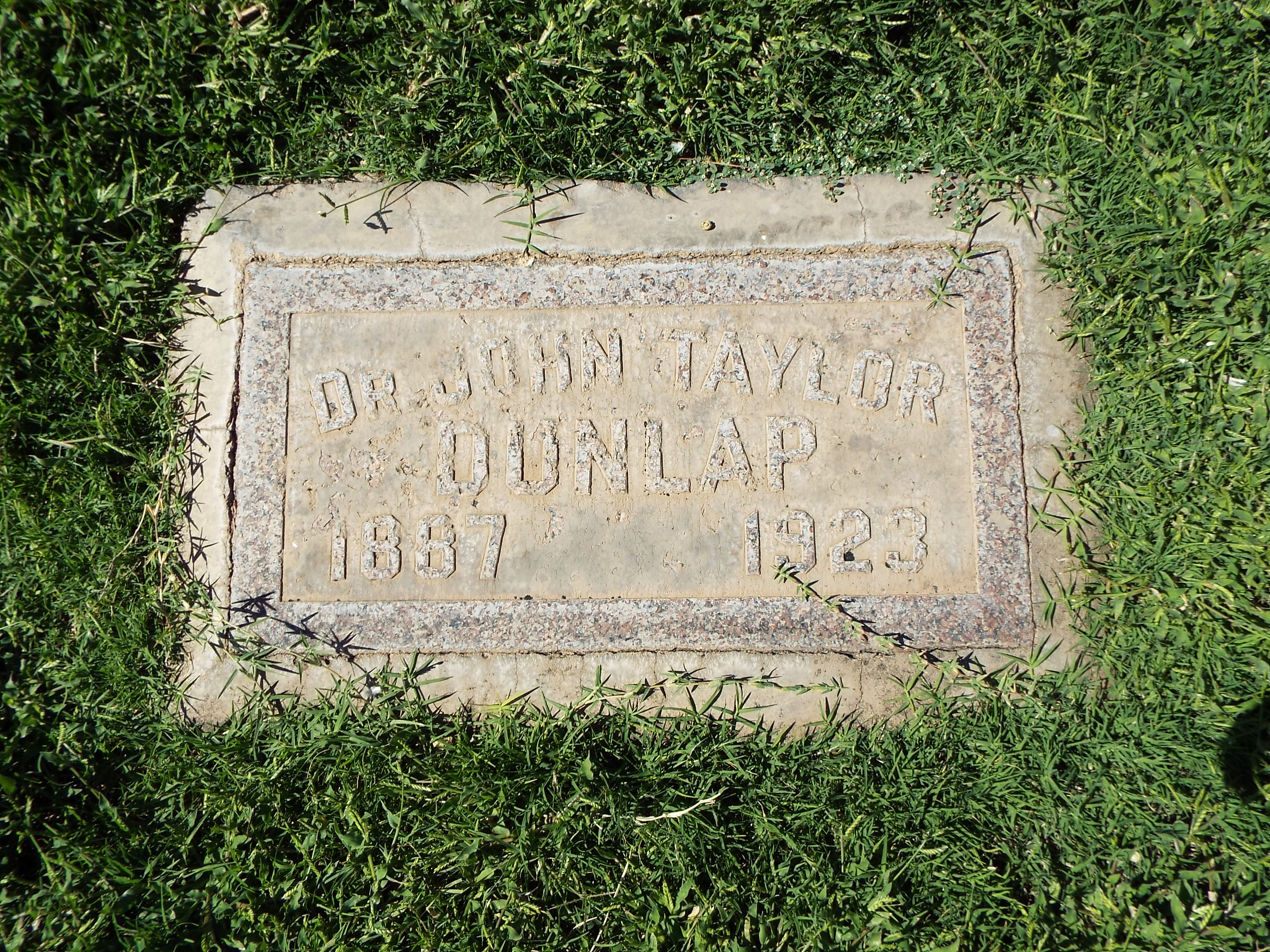
Grave-site of Dr. John Taylor Dunlap (1887–1923).

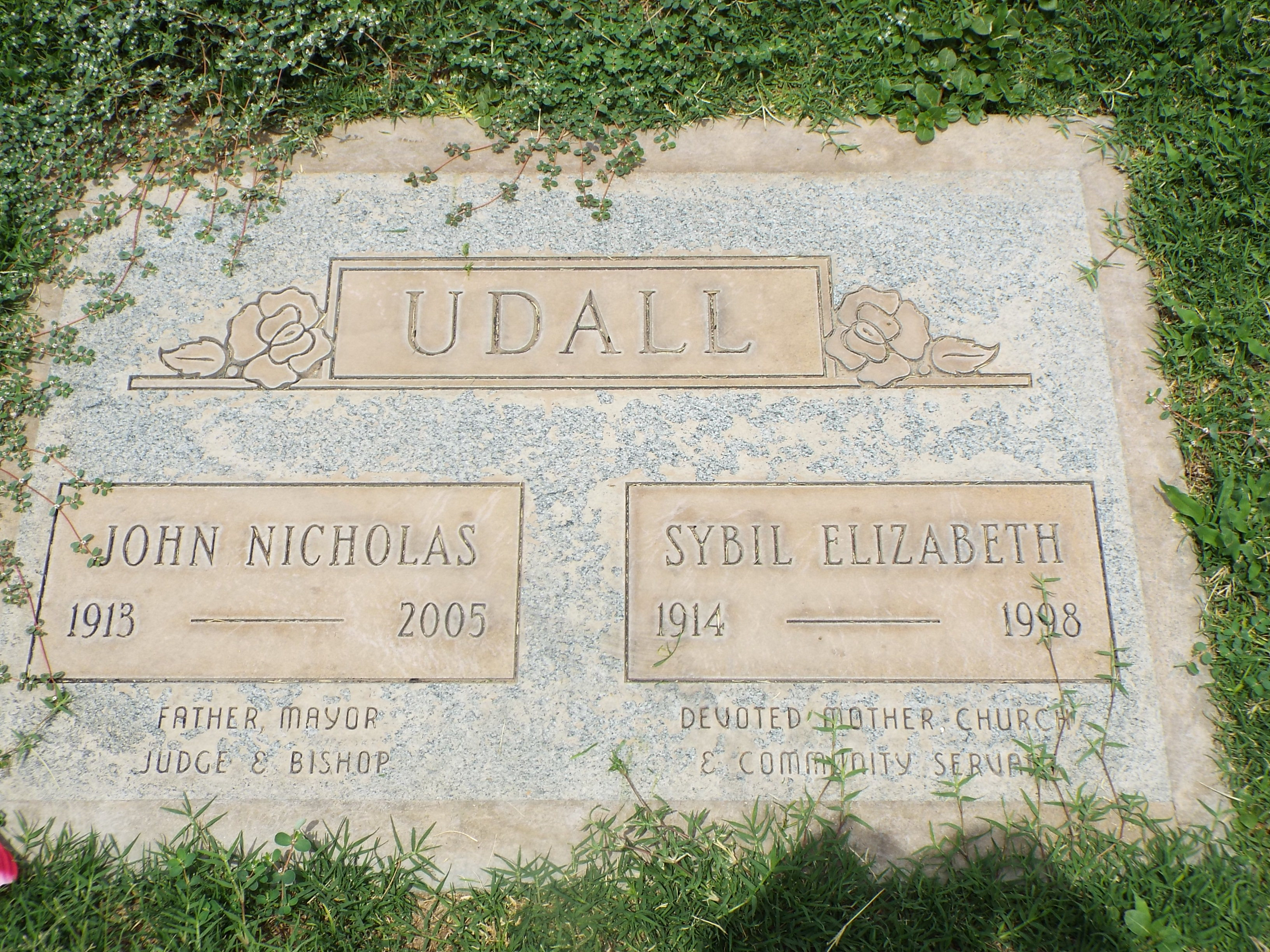
Grave-site of John Nicholas Udall (1913–2005) and his wife Sybil Elizabeth Udall (1914–1998).

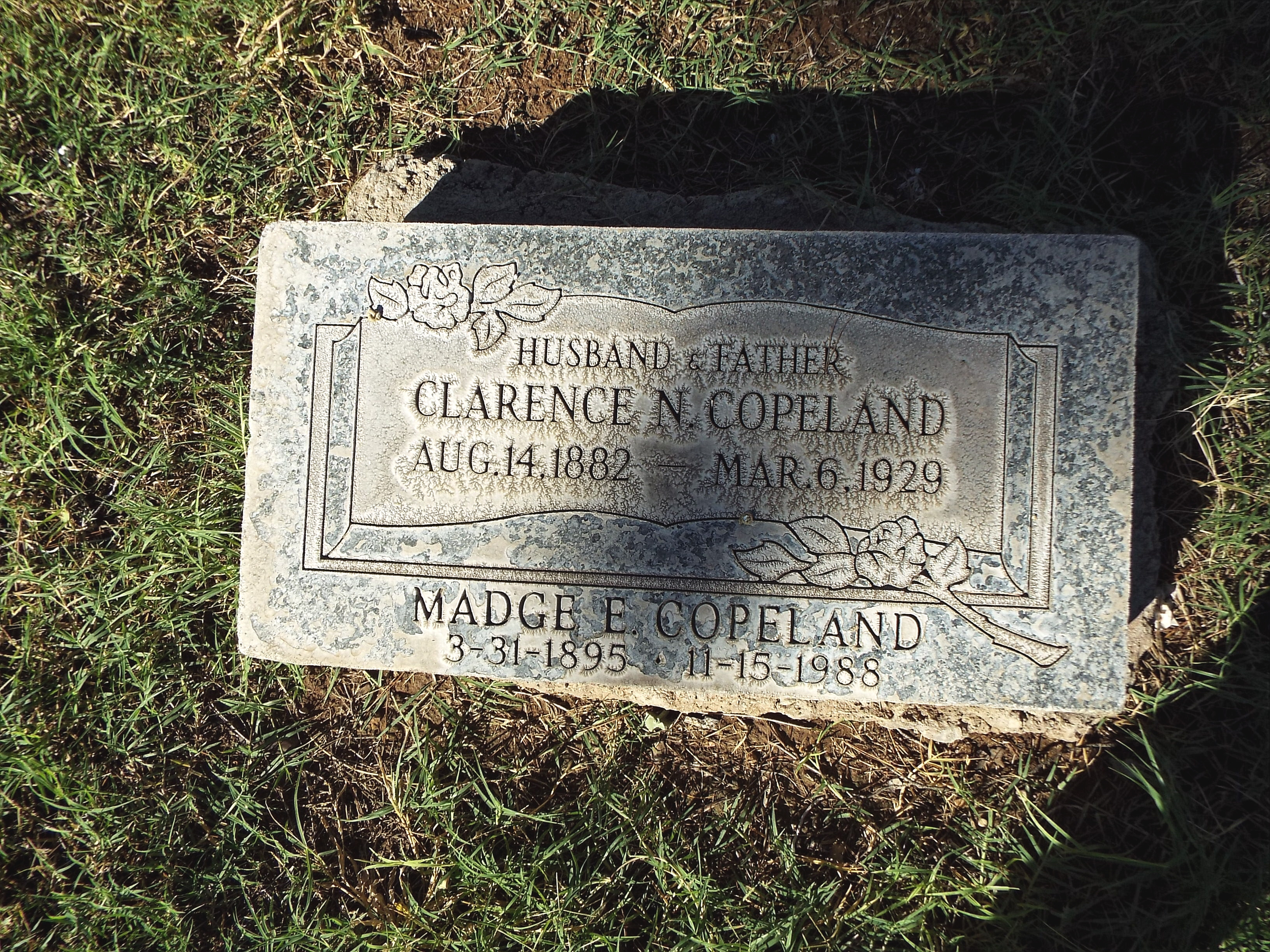
Grave-site of Madge E, Copeland (1895–1988) and her husband Clarence N. Copeland (1882–1929).

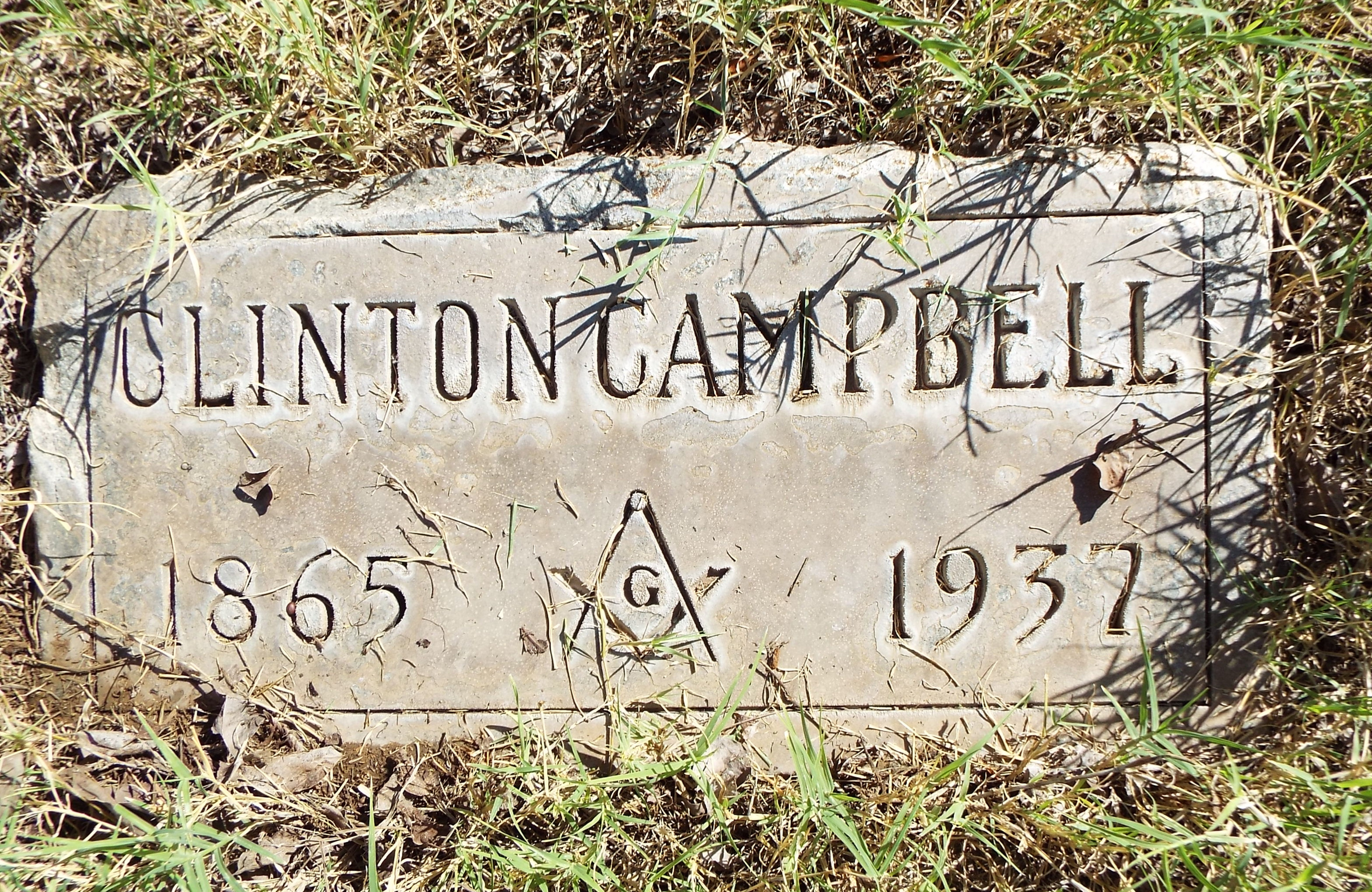
Grave-site of Clinton Campbell (1865–1937).

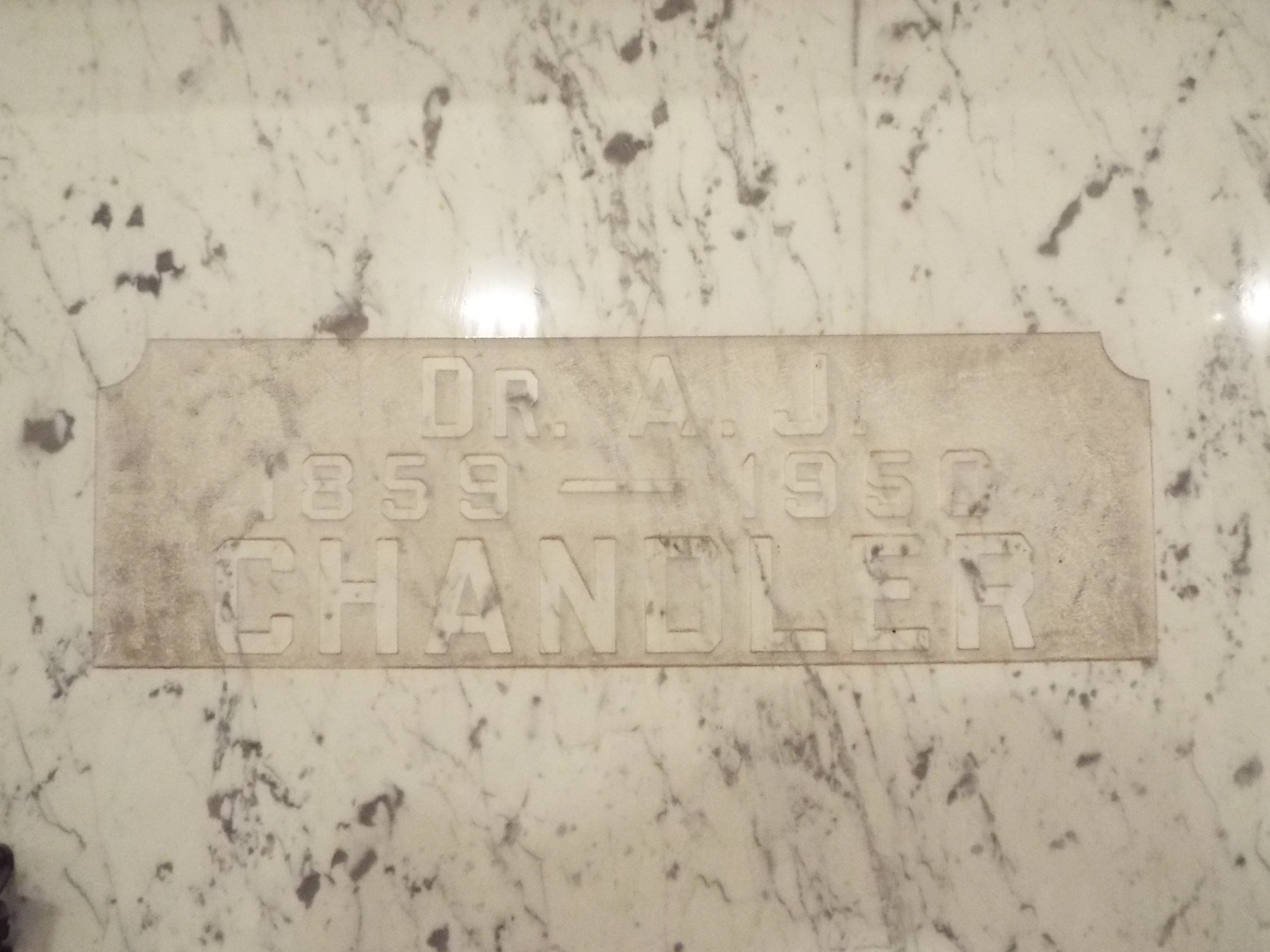
Crypt of Alexander J. Chandler (1859–1950) founder of the City of Chandler, Arizona.

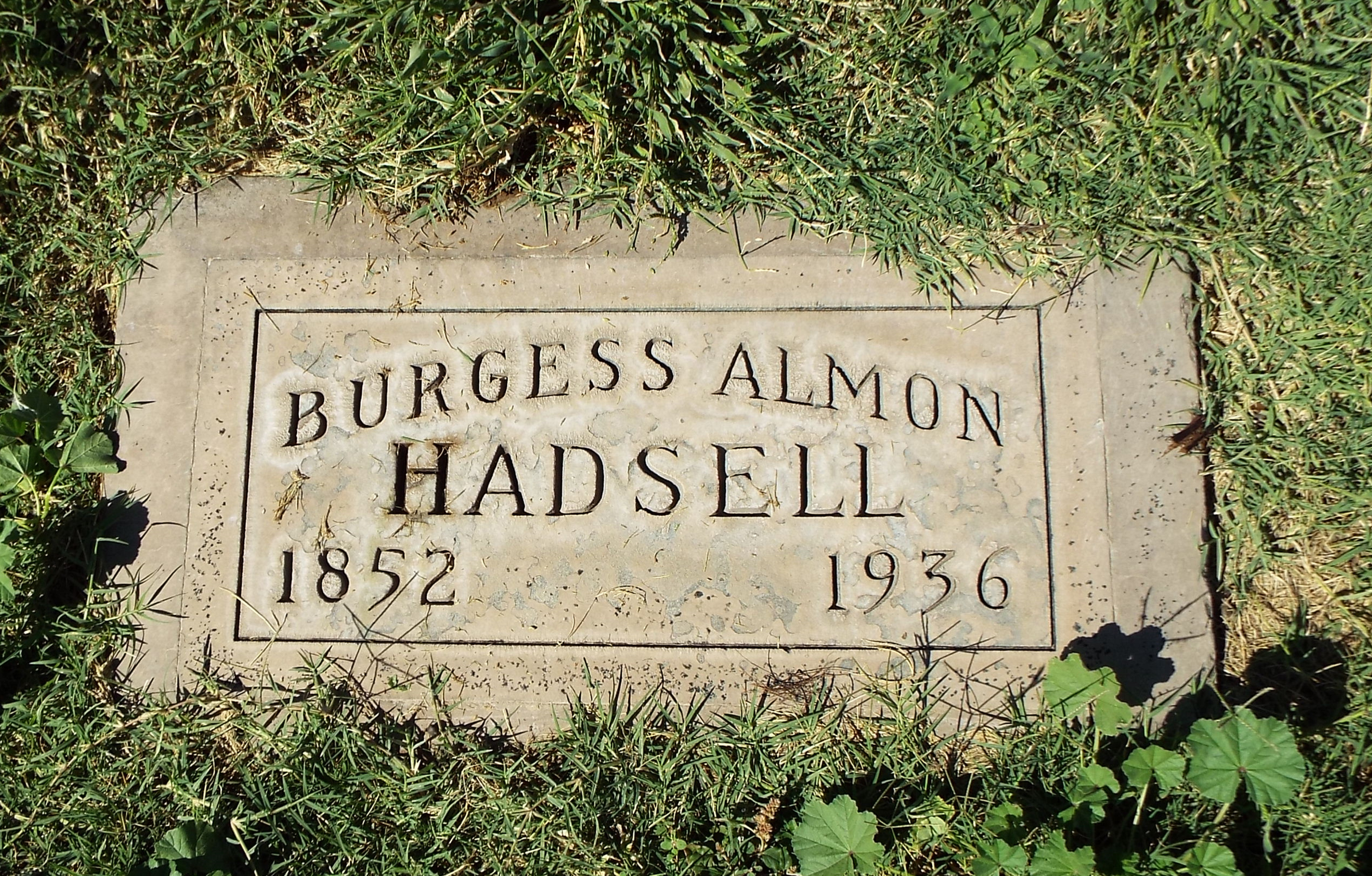
Grave-site of Burguess Almond Hadsell (1852–1936).

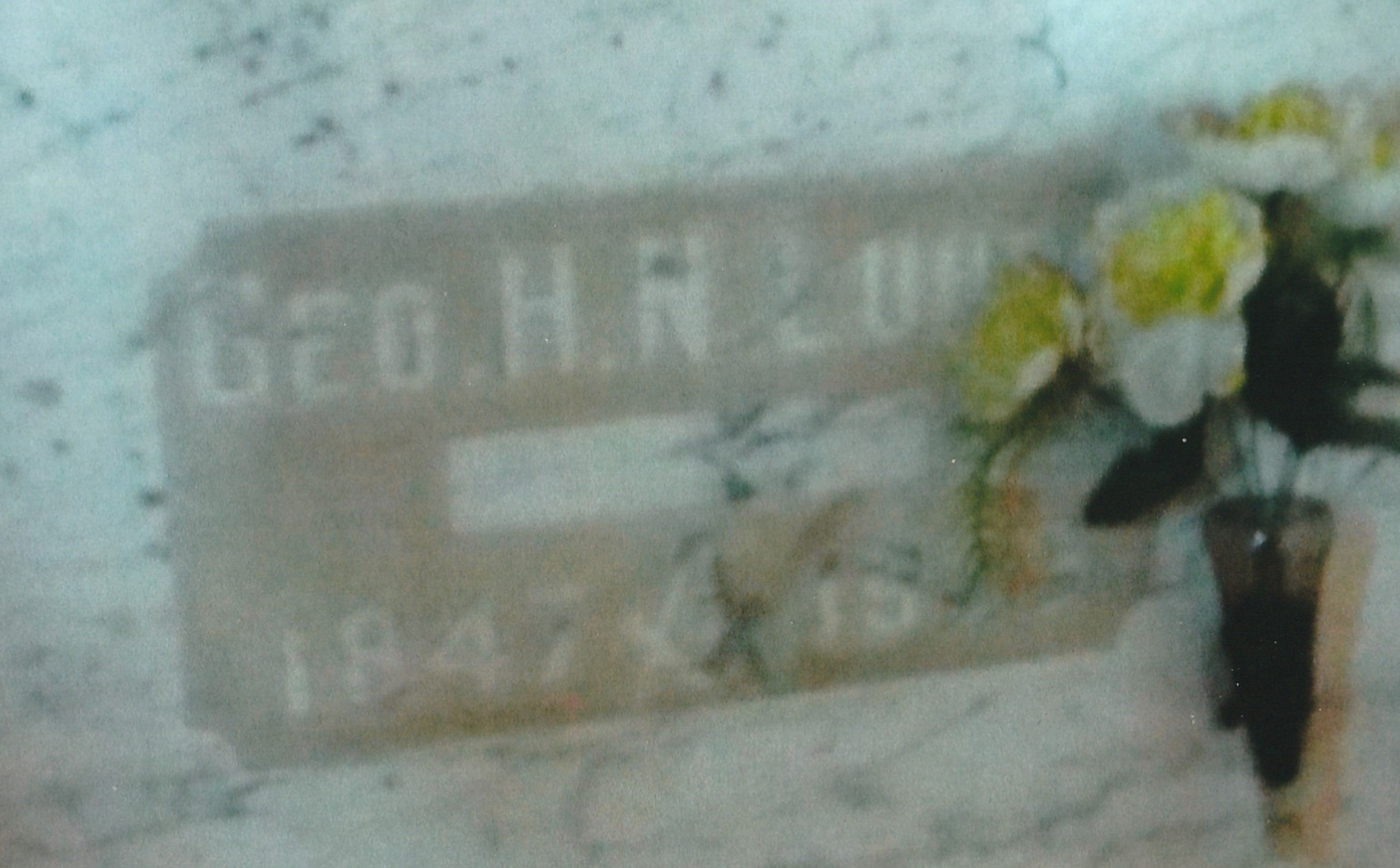
Crypt of George Henry Nicholas Luhrs, Sr. (1847–1929)

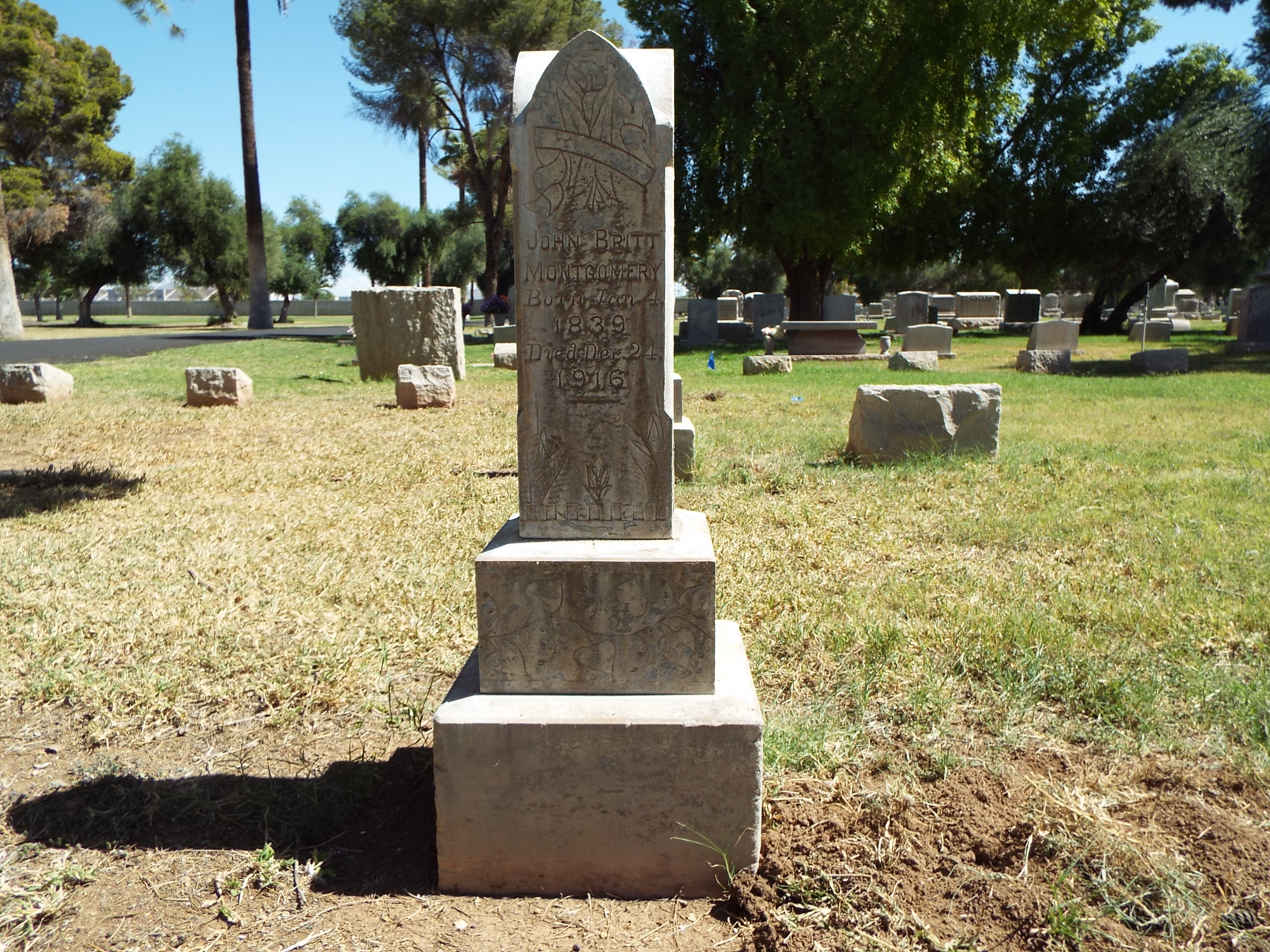
Grave-site of John Britt Montgomery (1839–1916).

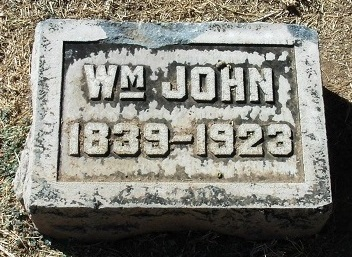
Grave-site of William John Murphy (1839–1923).

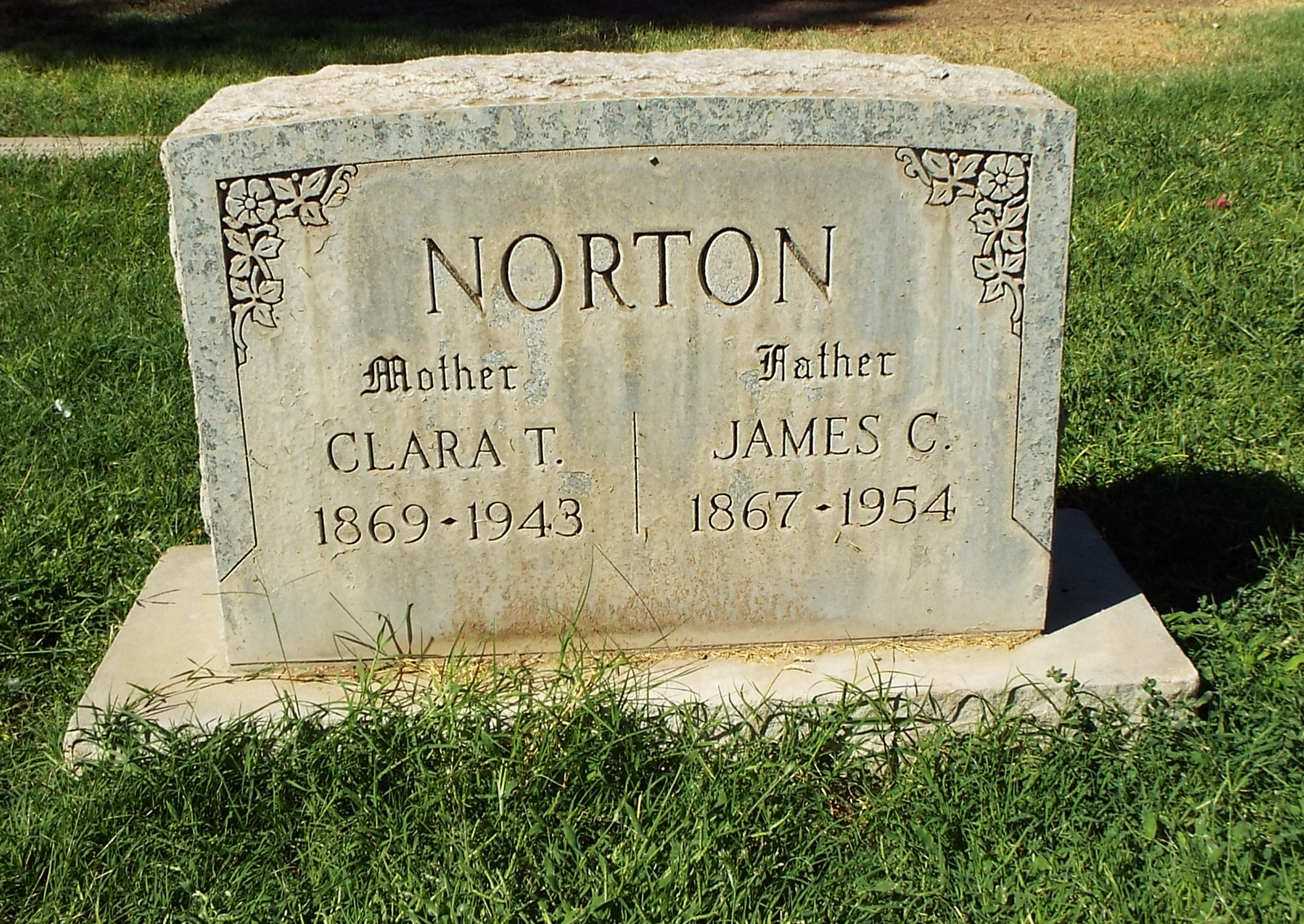
Grave-site of Dr. James Collier Norton (1867–1954) and his wife Clara Tufts Norton (1869–1943).

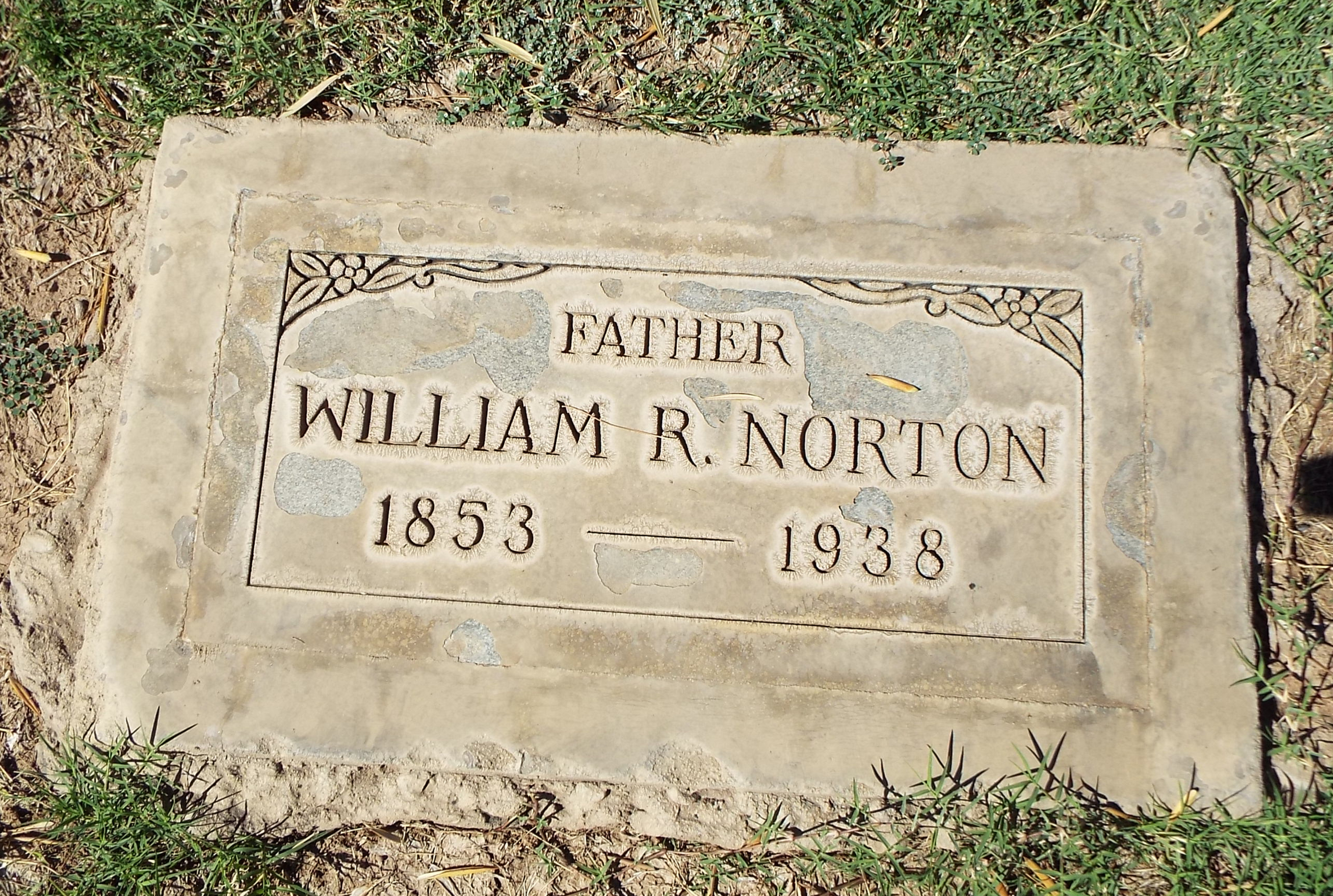
Grave-site of William R. Norton (1853–1938).

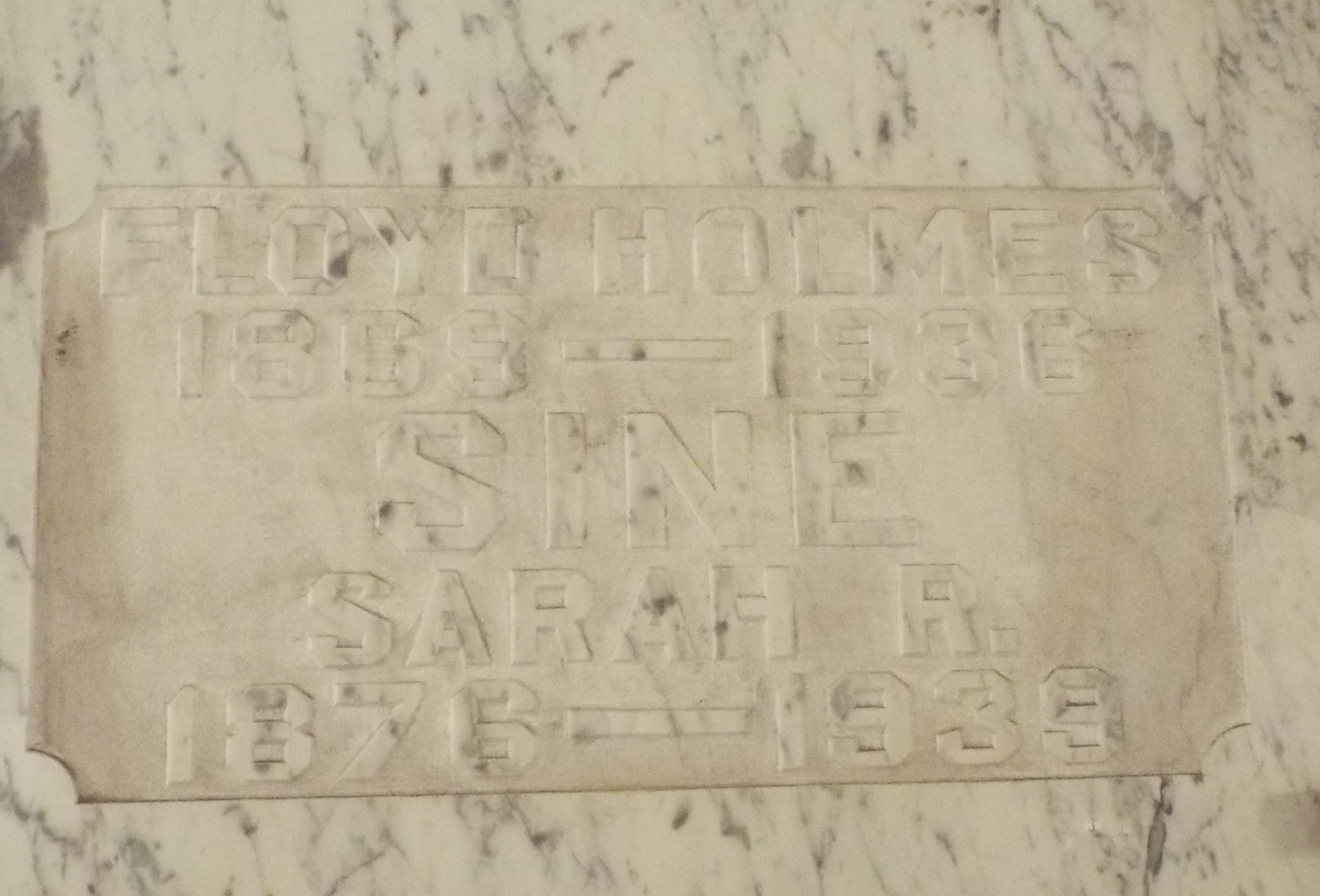
Crypt of Floyd Holmes Sine (1869–1936) and his wife Sarah R. Sine (1876–1939).

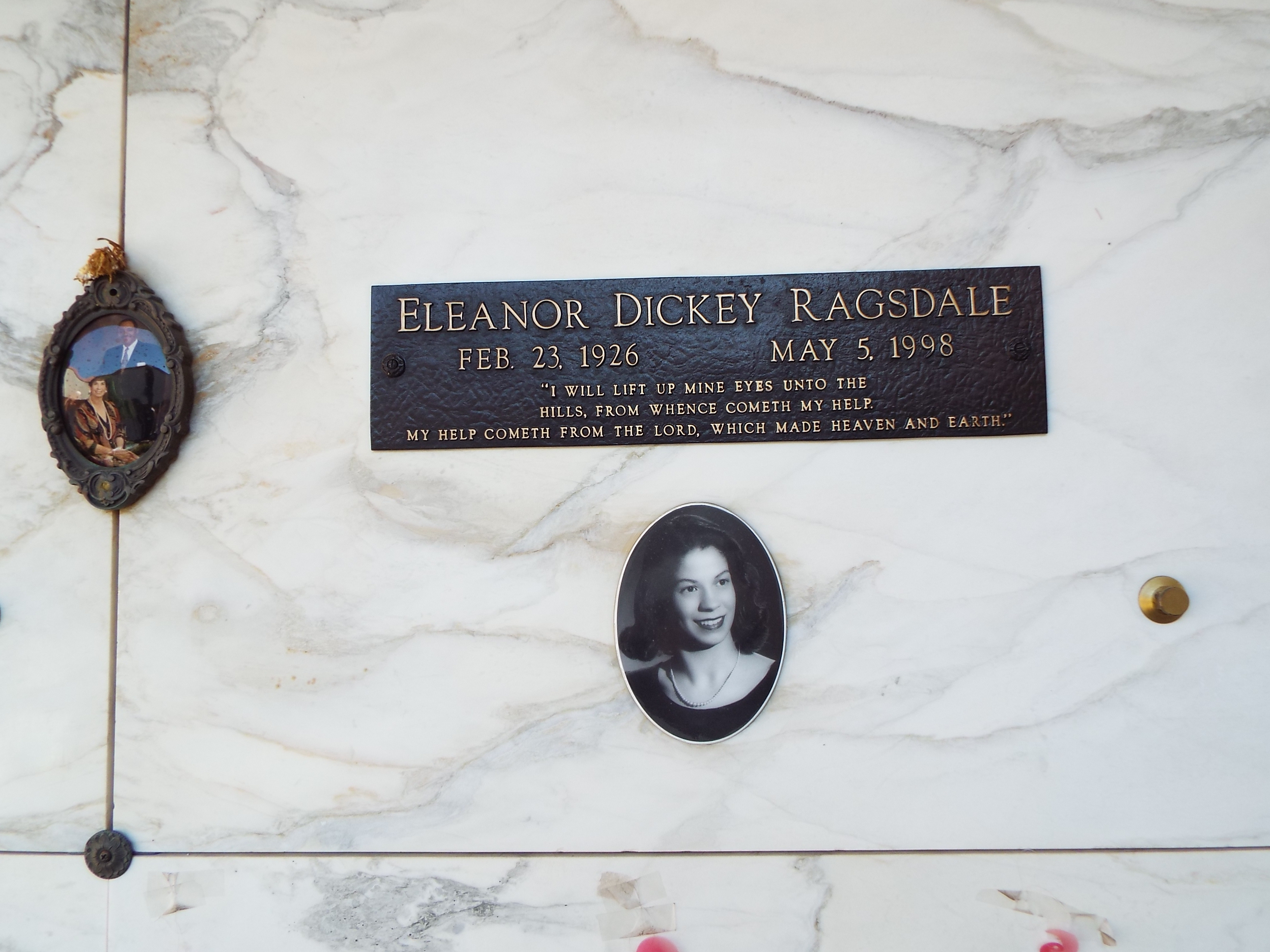
Crypt of Eleanor Ragsdale (1926–1998).

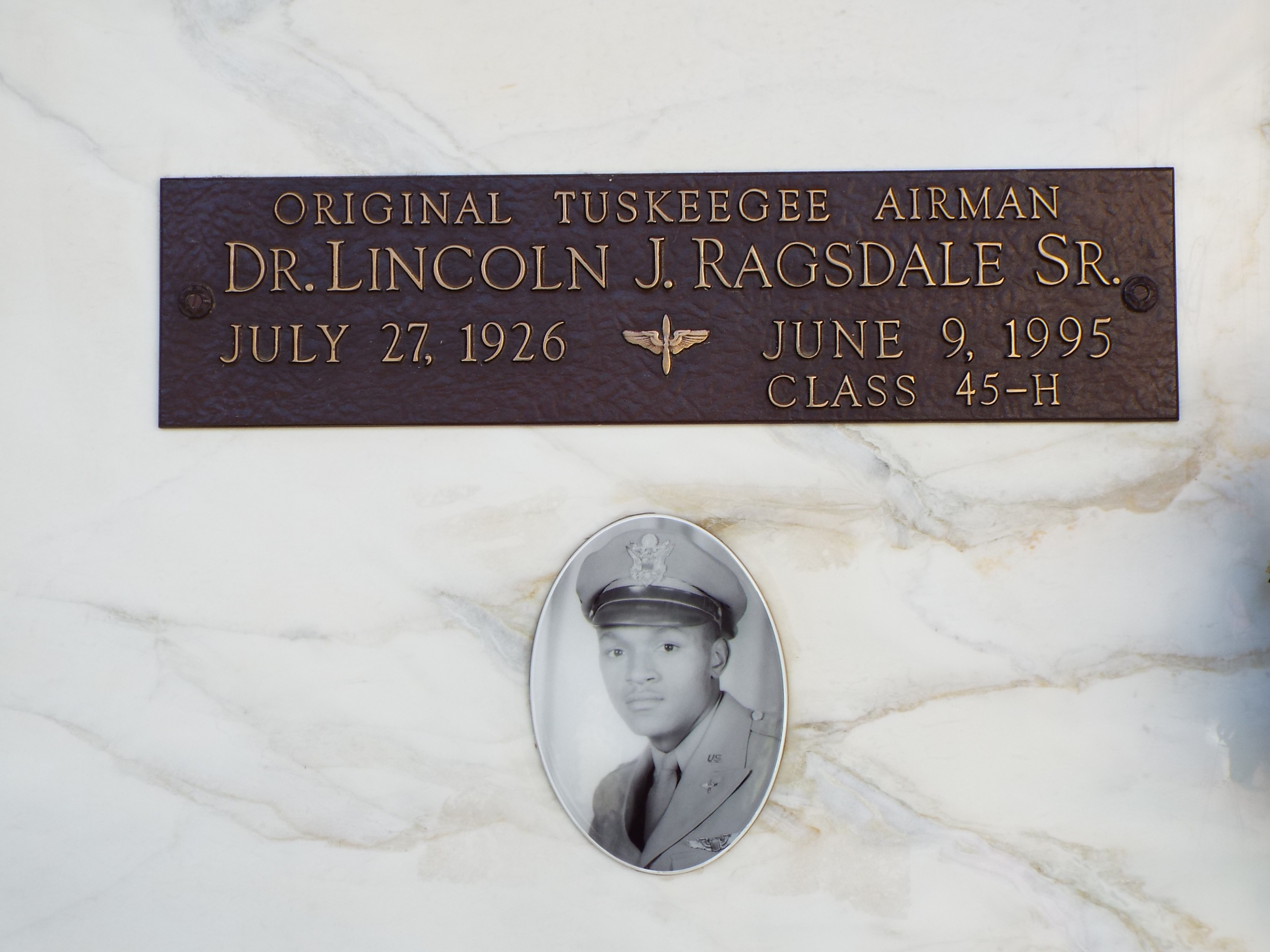
Crypt of Dr. Lincoln Johnson Ragsdale, Sr. (1926–1995).

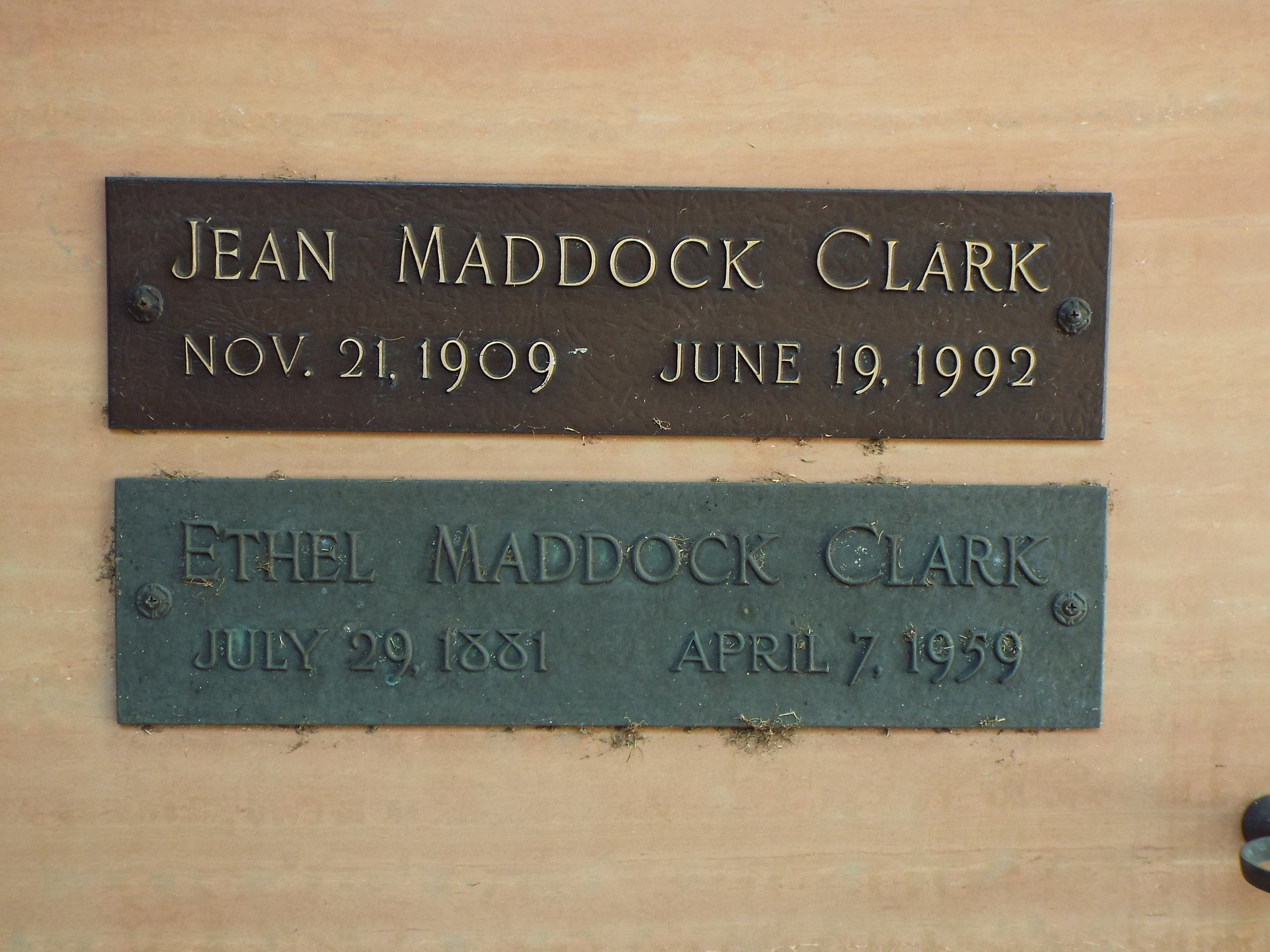
Crypt of Jean Maddock Clark (1909–1992) and Ethel Maddock Clark (1881–1959).

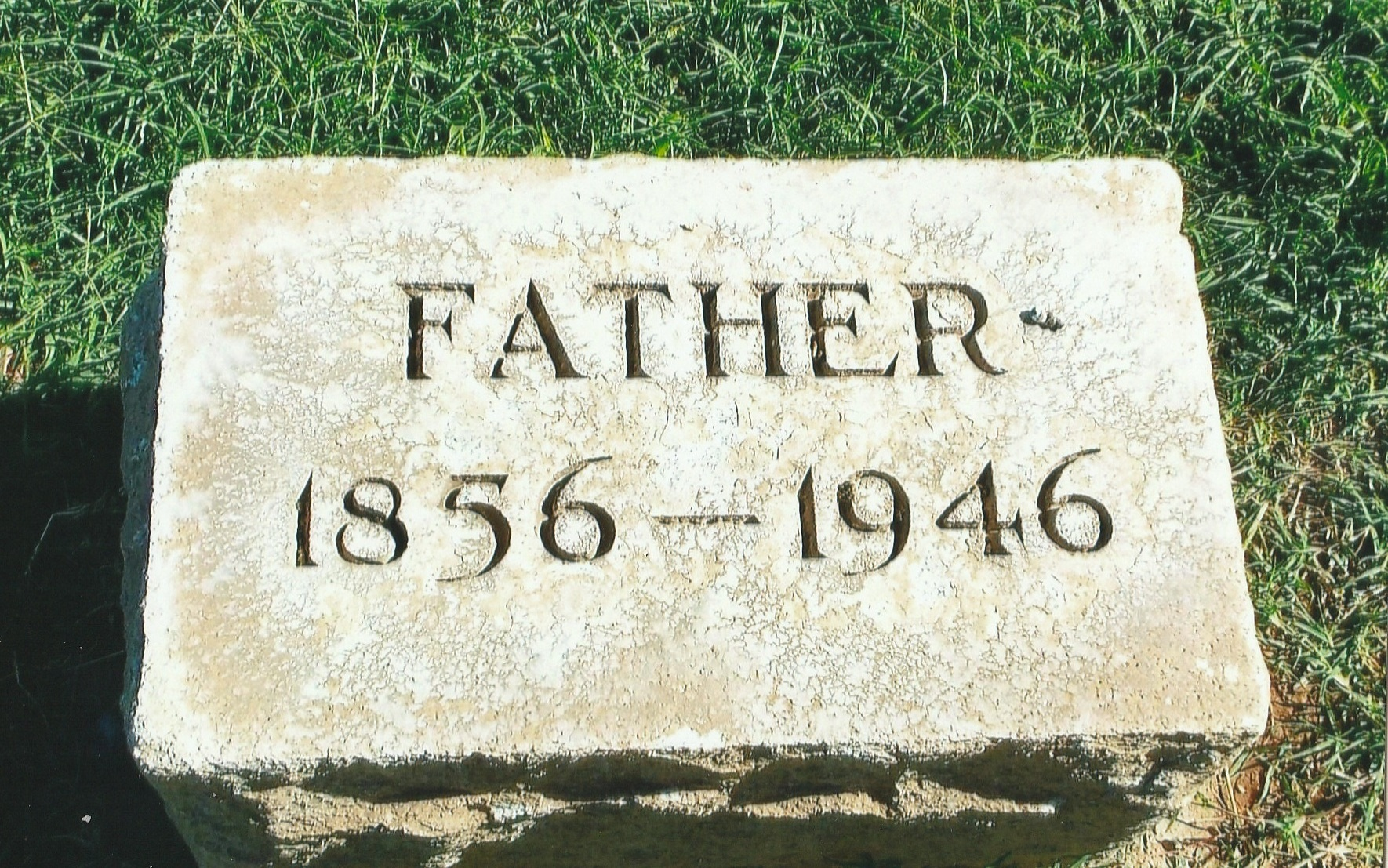
Grave-site of James Miller Creighton (1856–1946).

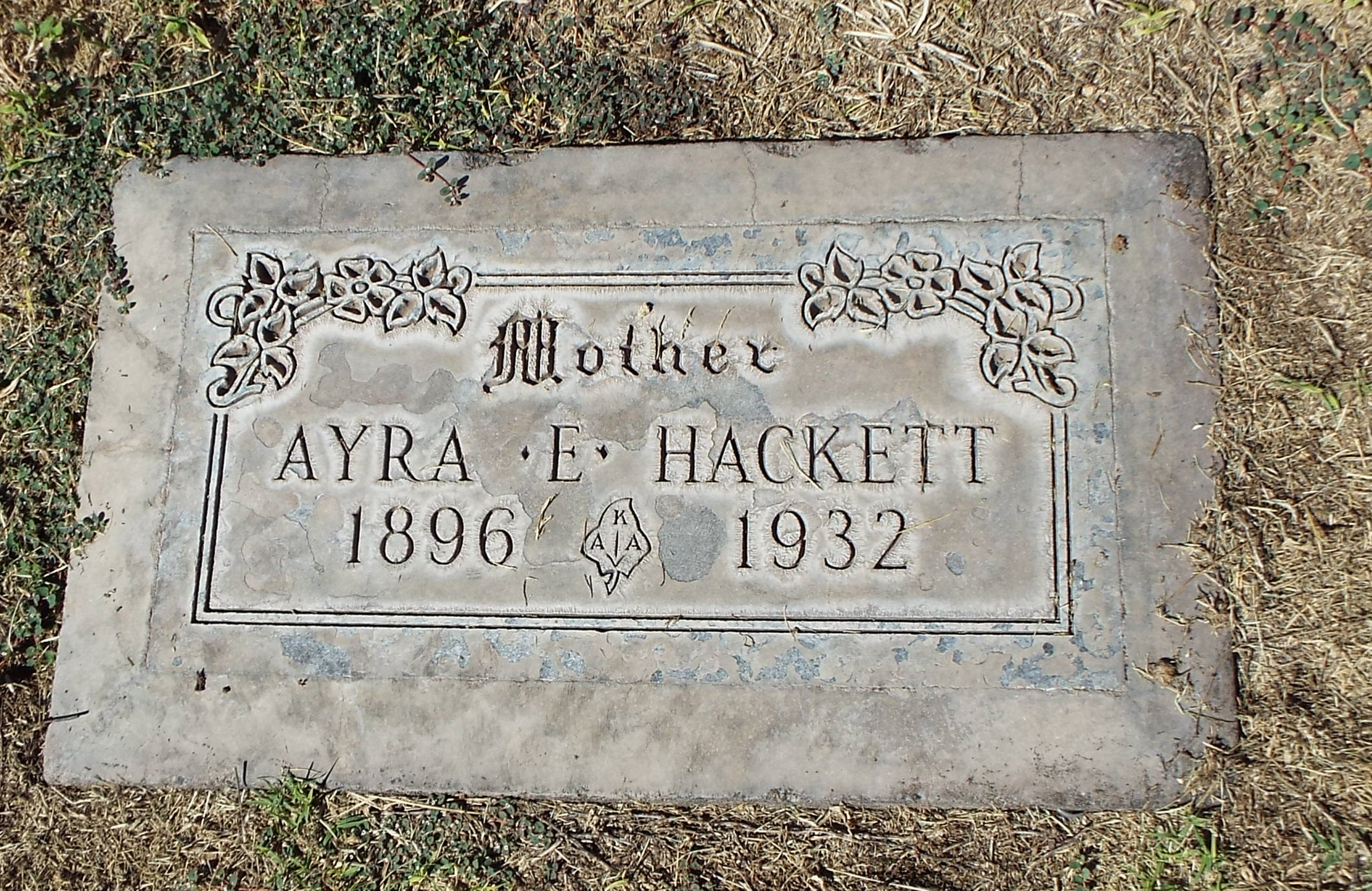
Grave-site of Ayra E. Hackett (1896–1932).

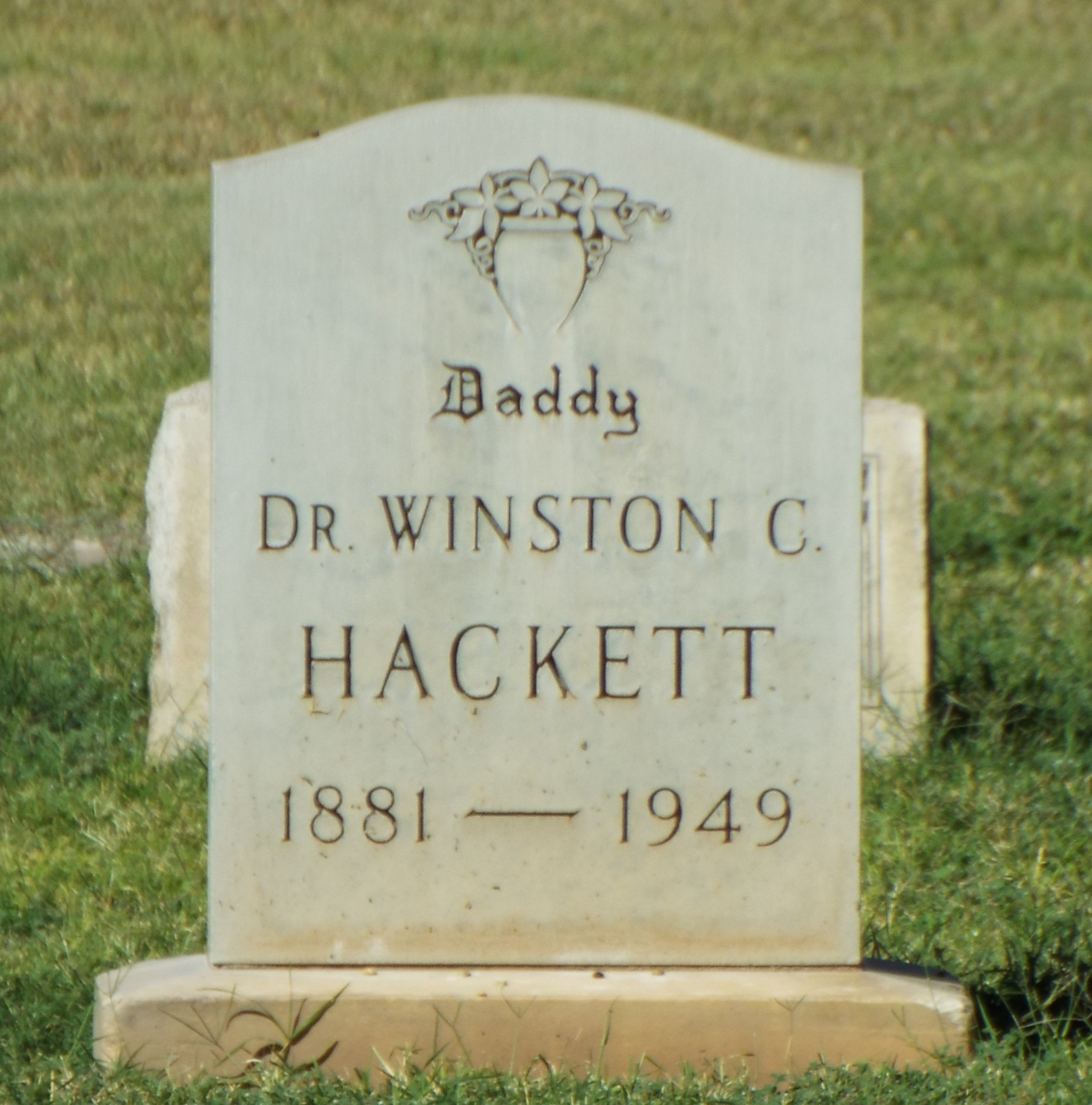
Grave-site of Winston C. Hackett (1881–1949).

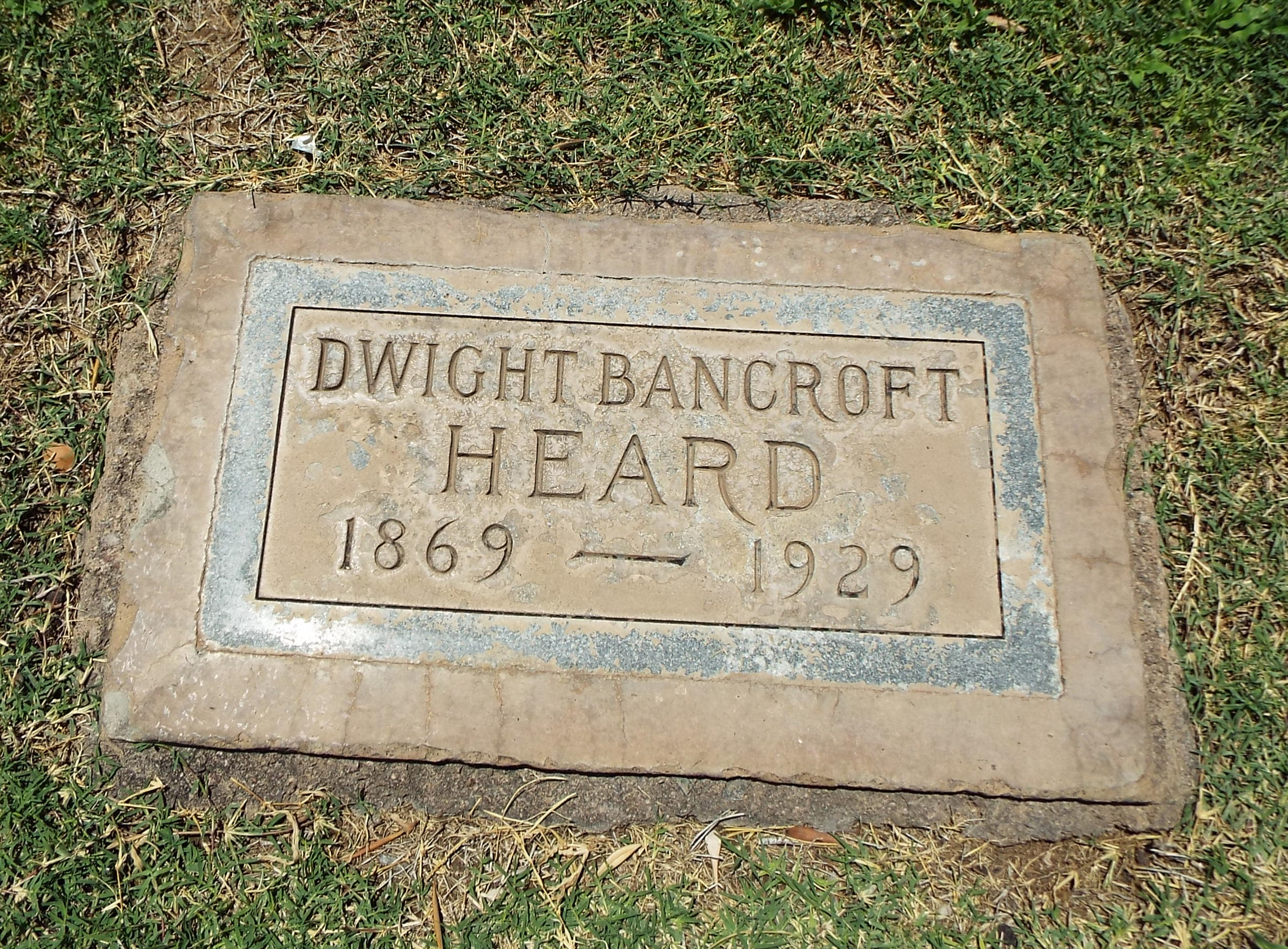
Grave-site of Dwight Bancroft Heard (1869–1929).

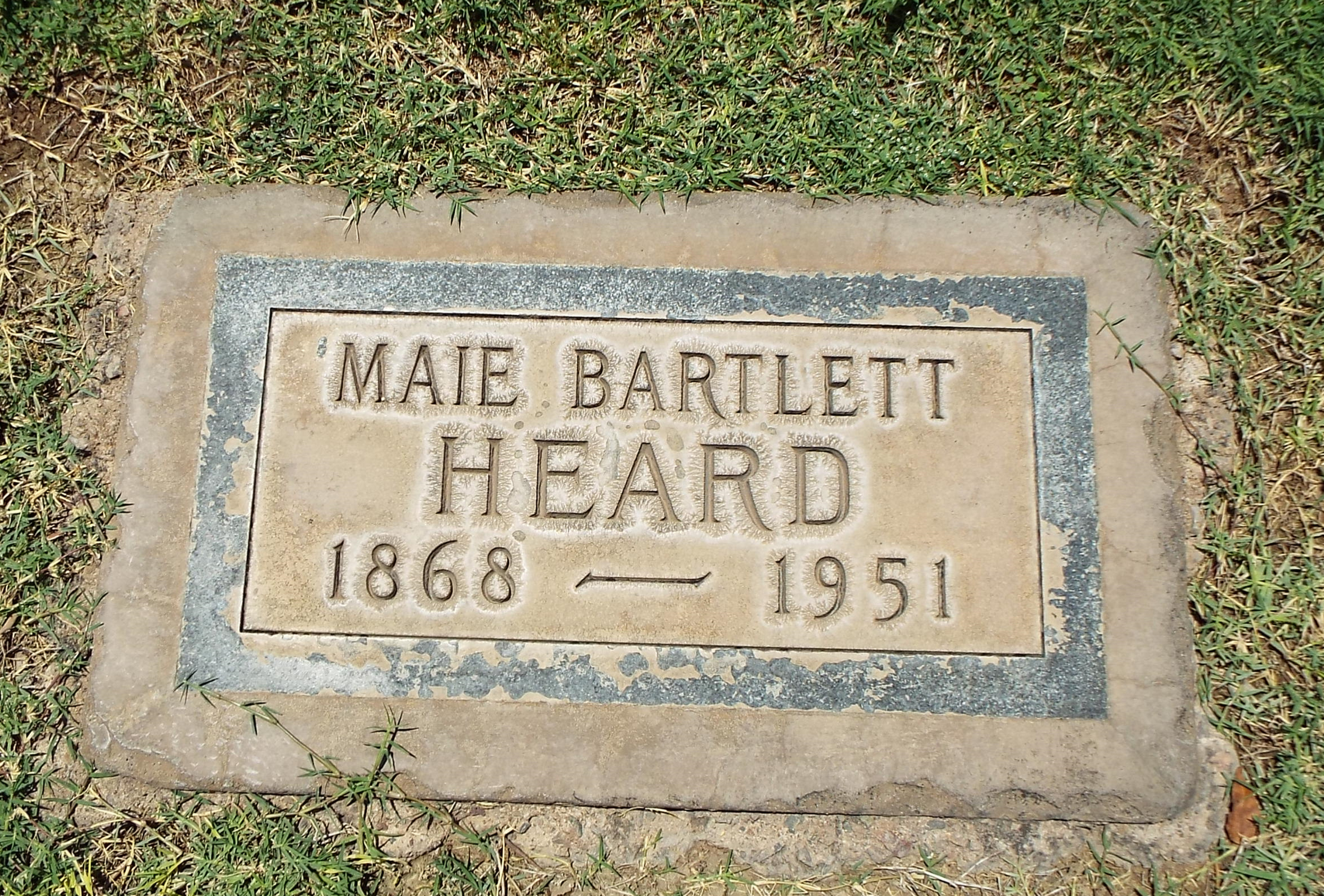
Grave-site of Maie Bartlett Heard (1868–1951).

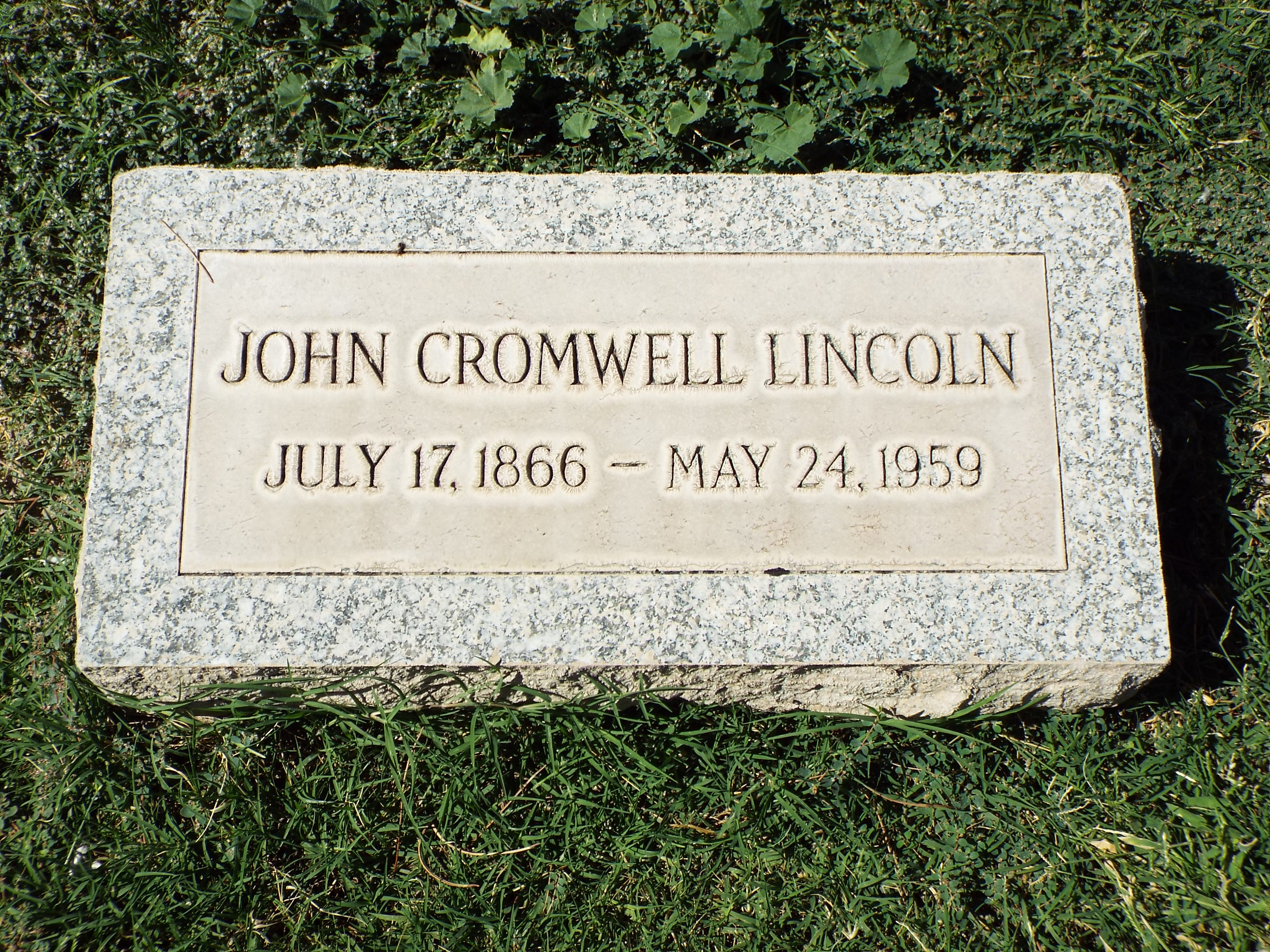
Grave-site of John Cromwell Lincoln (1866–1959).

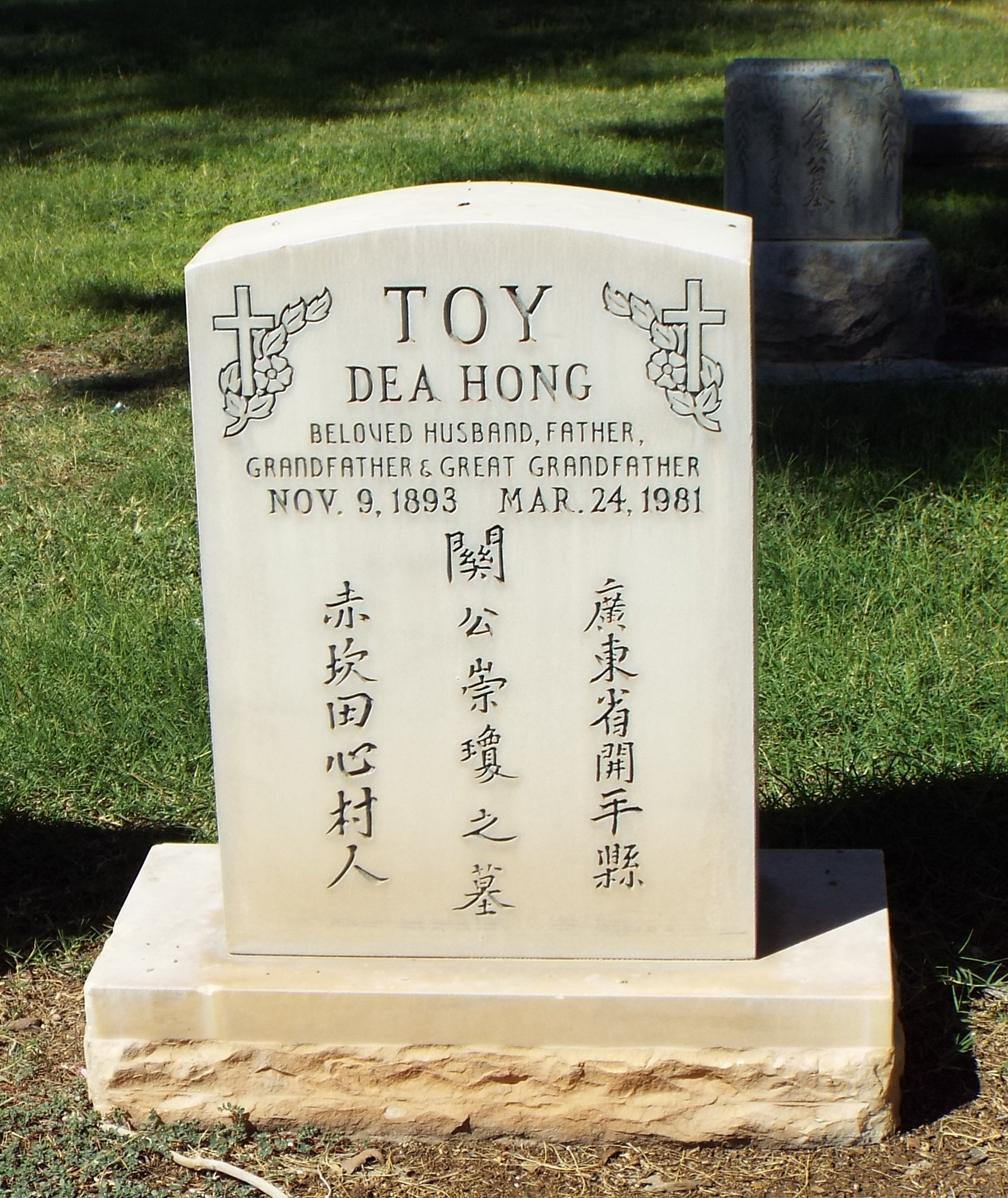
Grave-site of Dea Hong Toy (1893–1981).

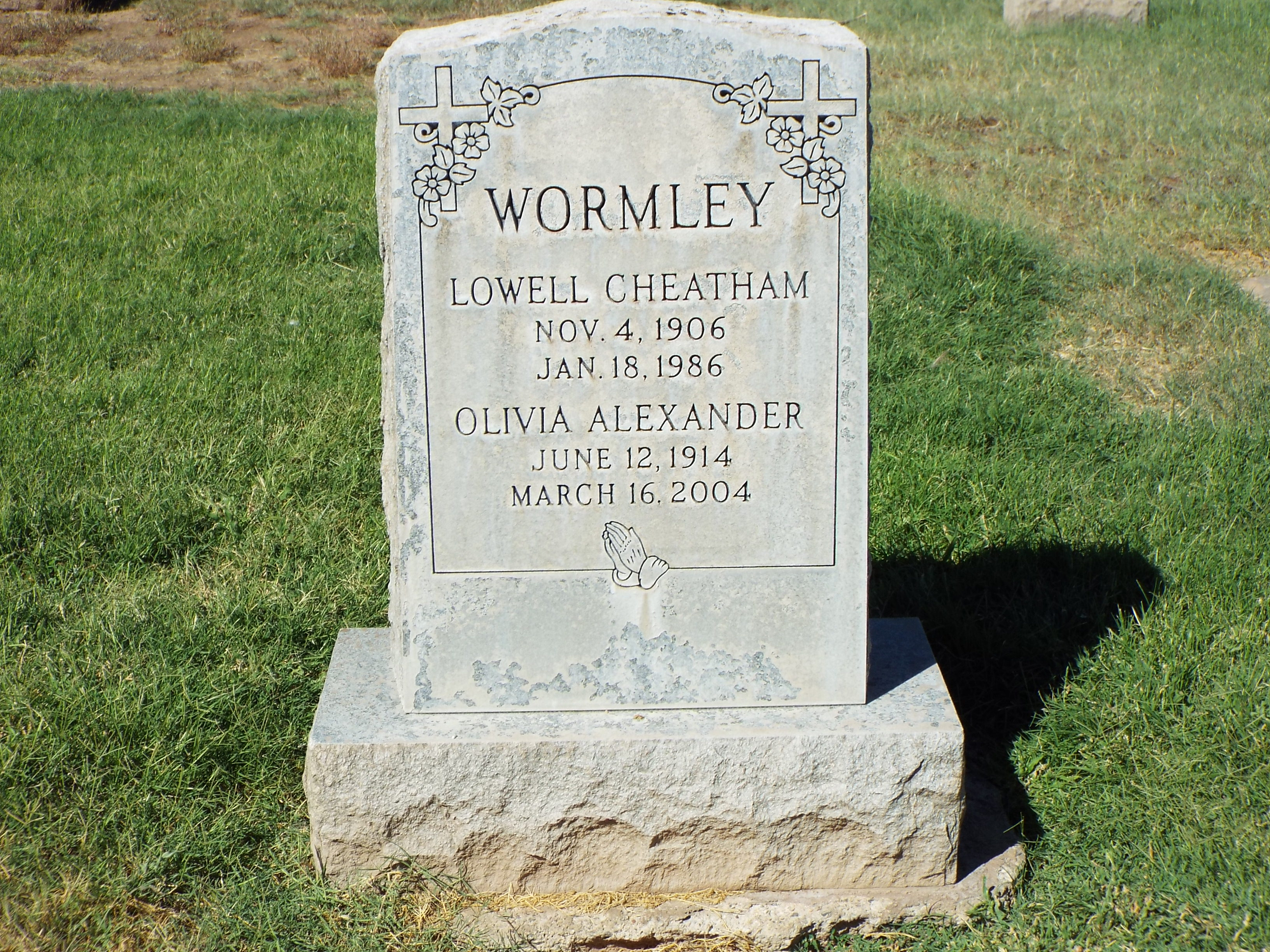
Grave-site of Dr. Lowell Cheatham Wormley (1906–1986) and his wife Olivia Alexander (1914–2004).

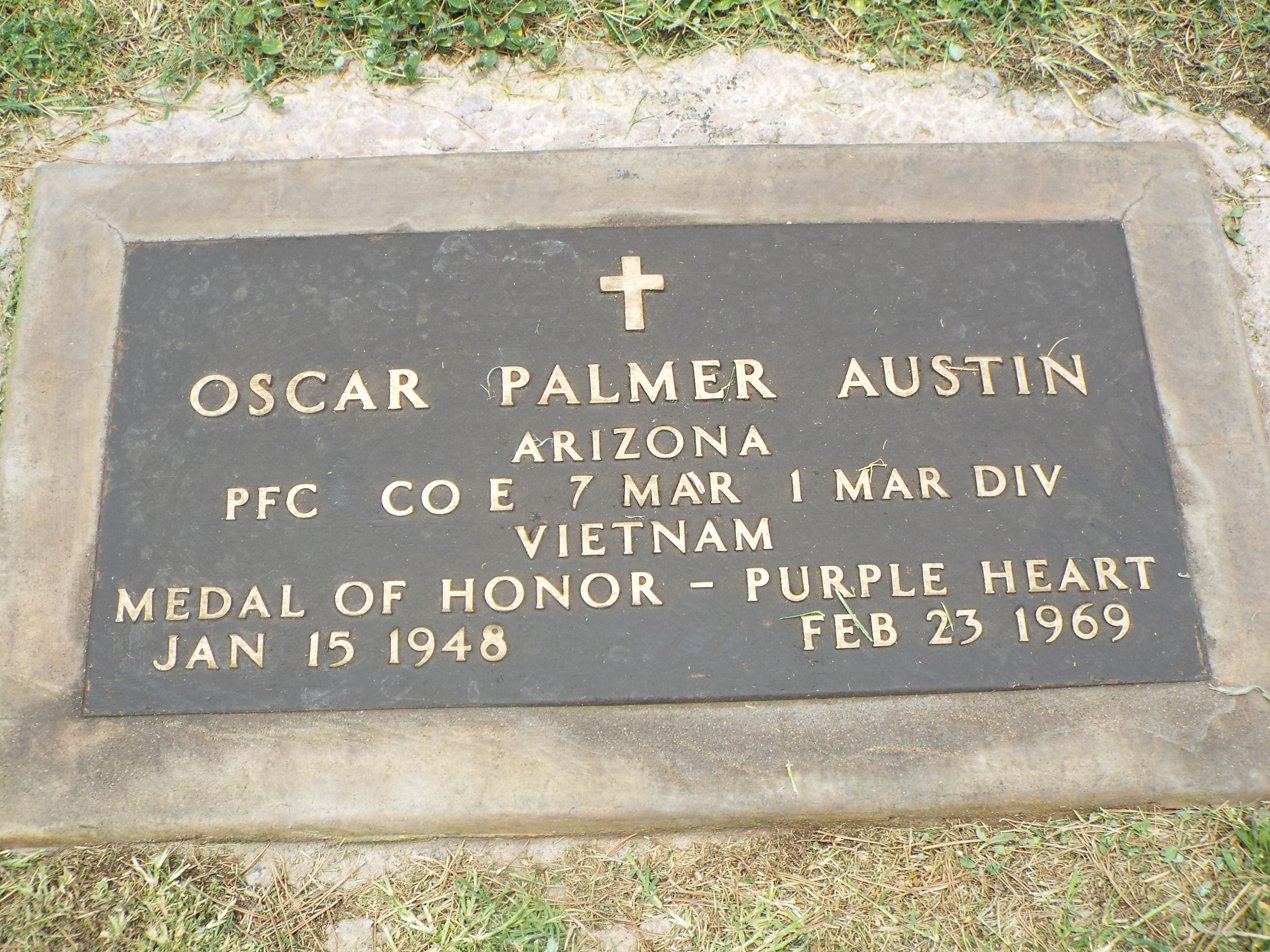
Grave-site of Oscar Palmer Austin (1949–1969)

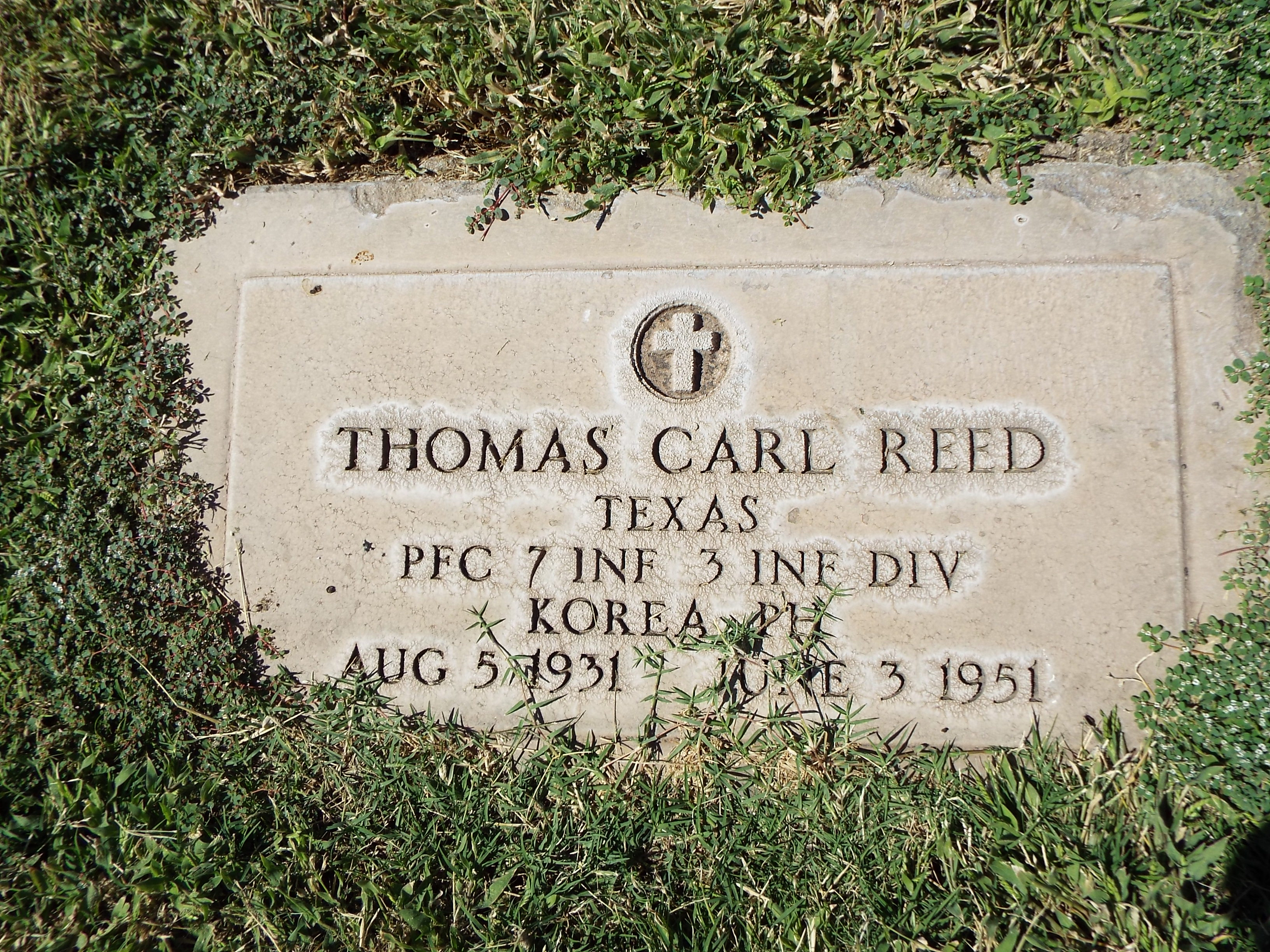
Grave-site of PFC Thomas Carl Reed (1932–1951).

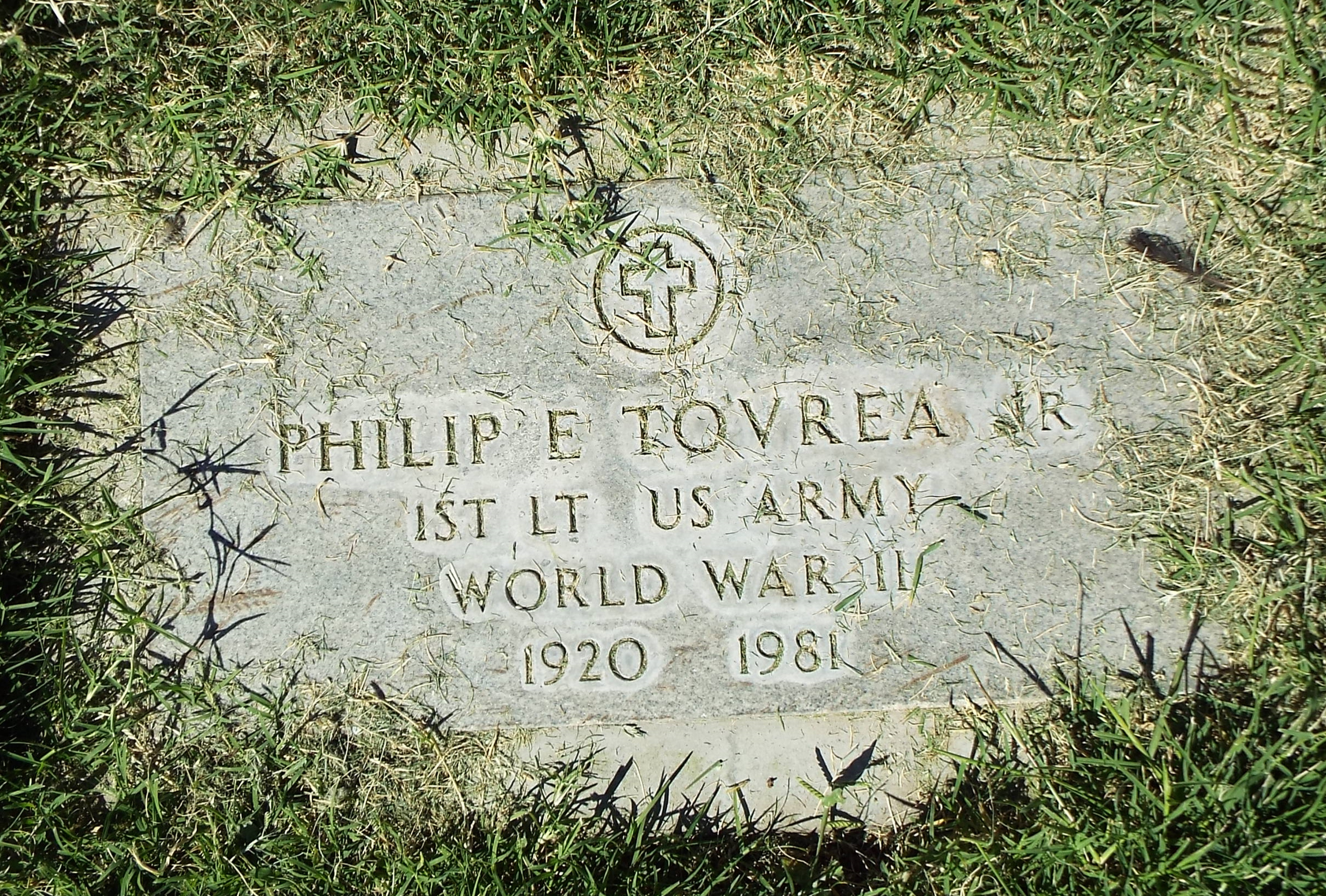
Grave-site of Philip Edward Tovrea Jr. (1920–1981).

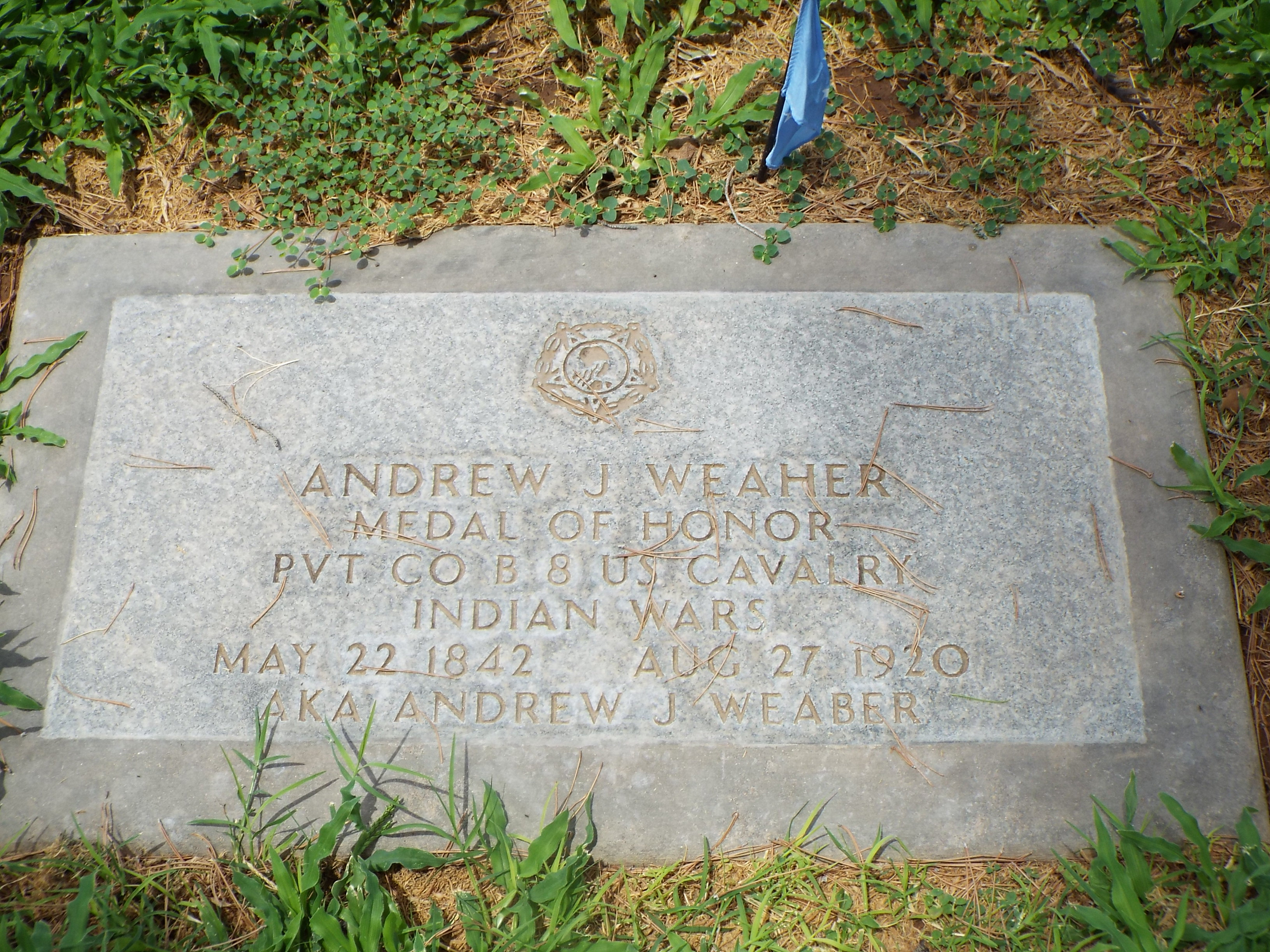
Grave-site of Andrew J. Weaher a.k.a. Andrew J. Weaber (1842–1920).

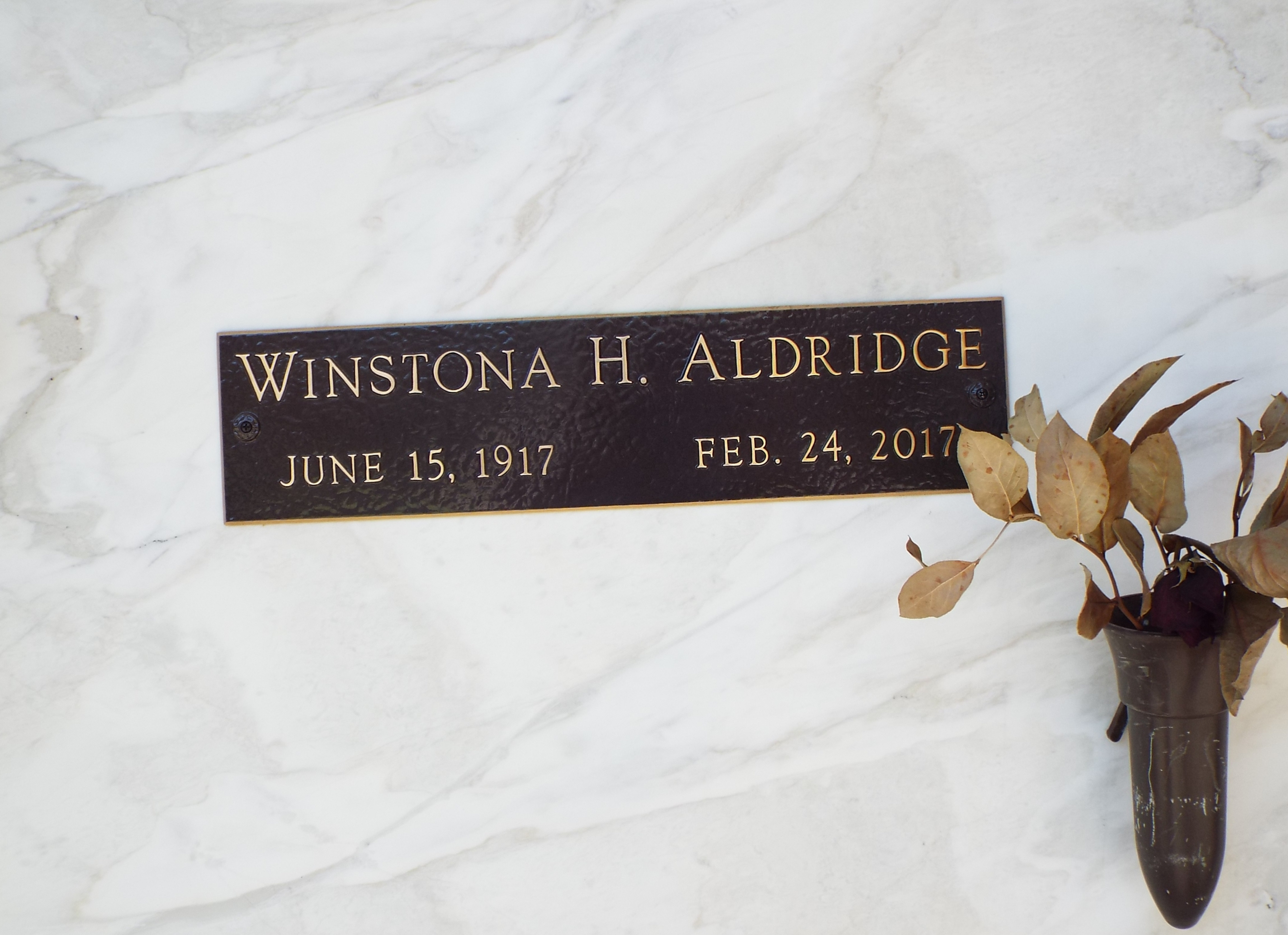
Crypt of Winstona Hackett Aldridge (1917–2017).

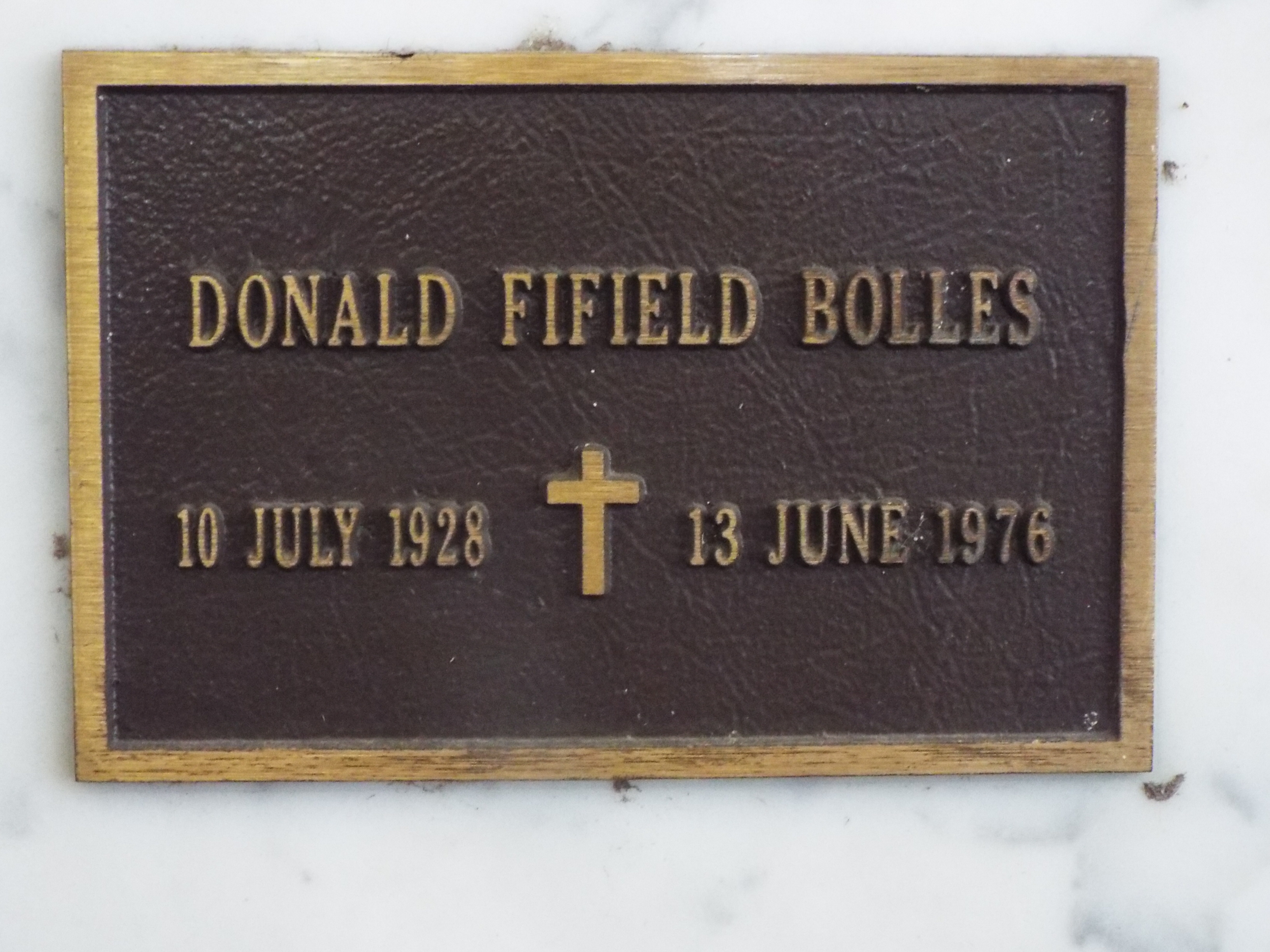
Crypt of Donald Fifield Bolles better known as Don Bolles (1928–1976).

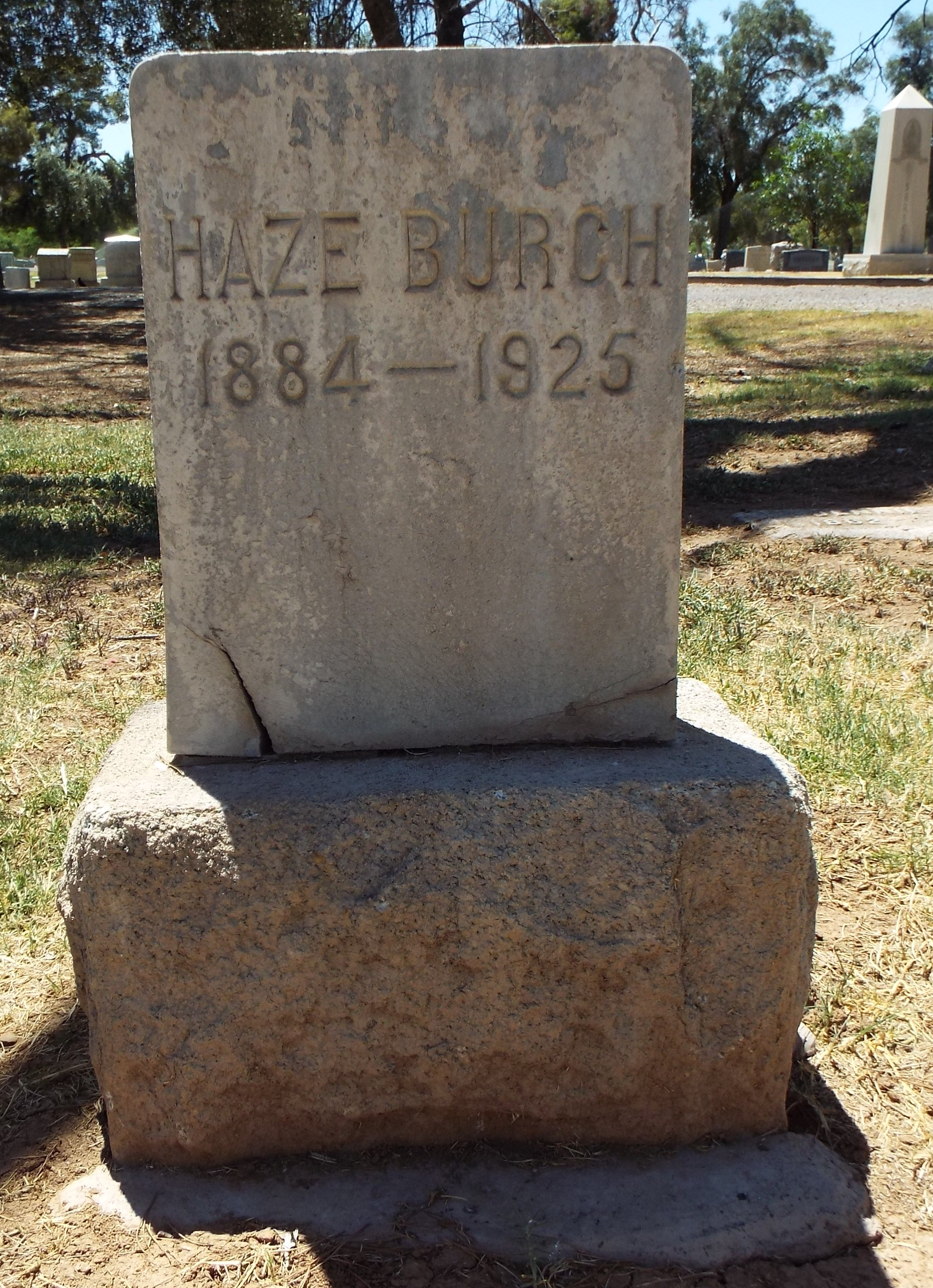
Grave-site of William "Haze" Hazelton Burch (1884–1925)

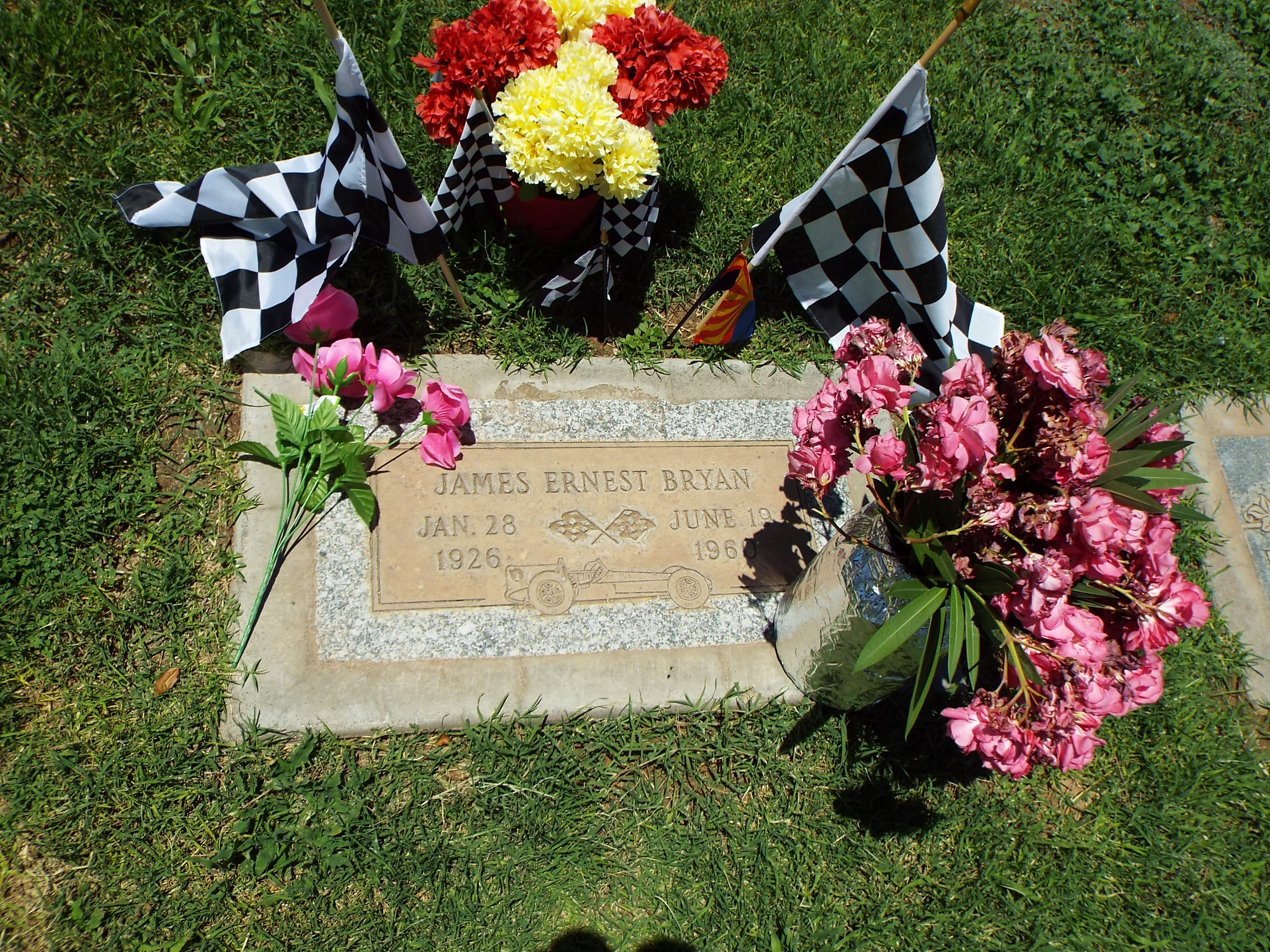
Grave-site of James Ernest Bryan (1926–1960).

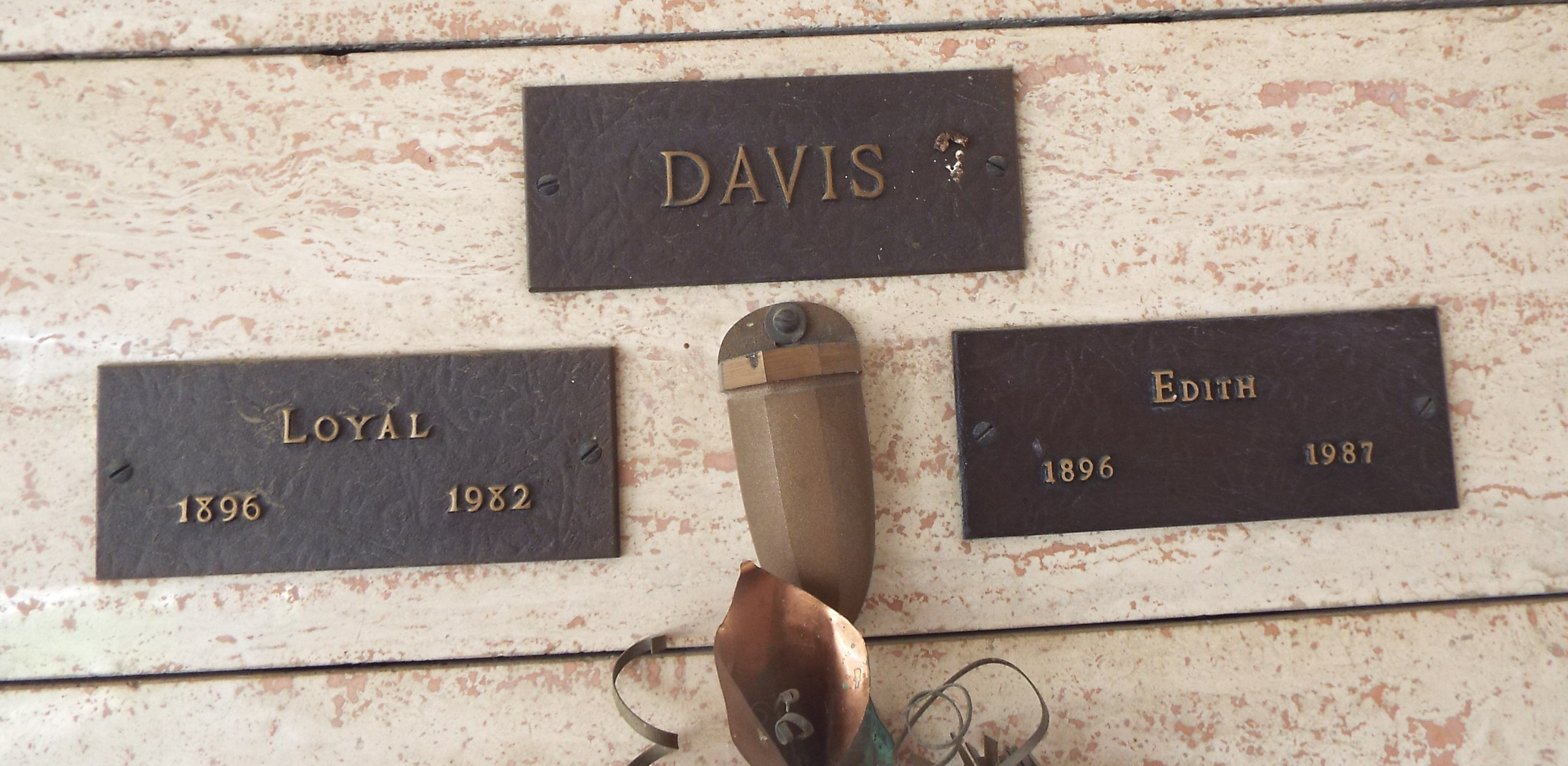
Crypt of Loyal Edward Davis (1896–1982) and his wife Edith Luckett Davis (1896–1987).

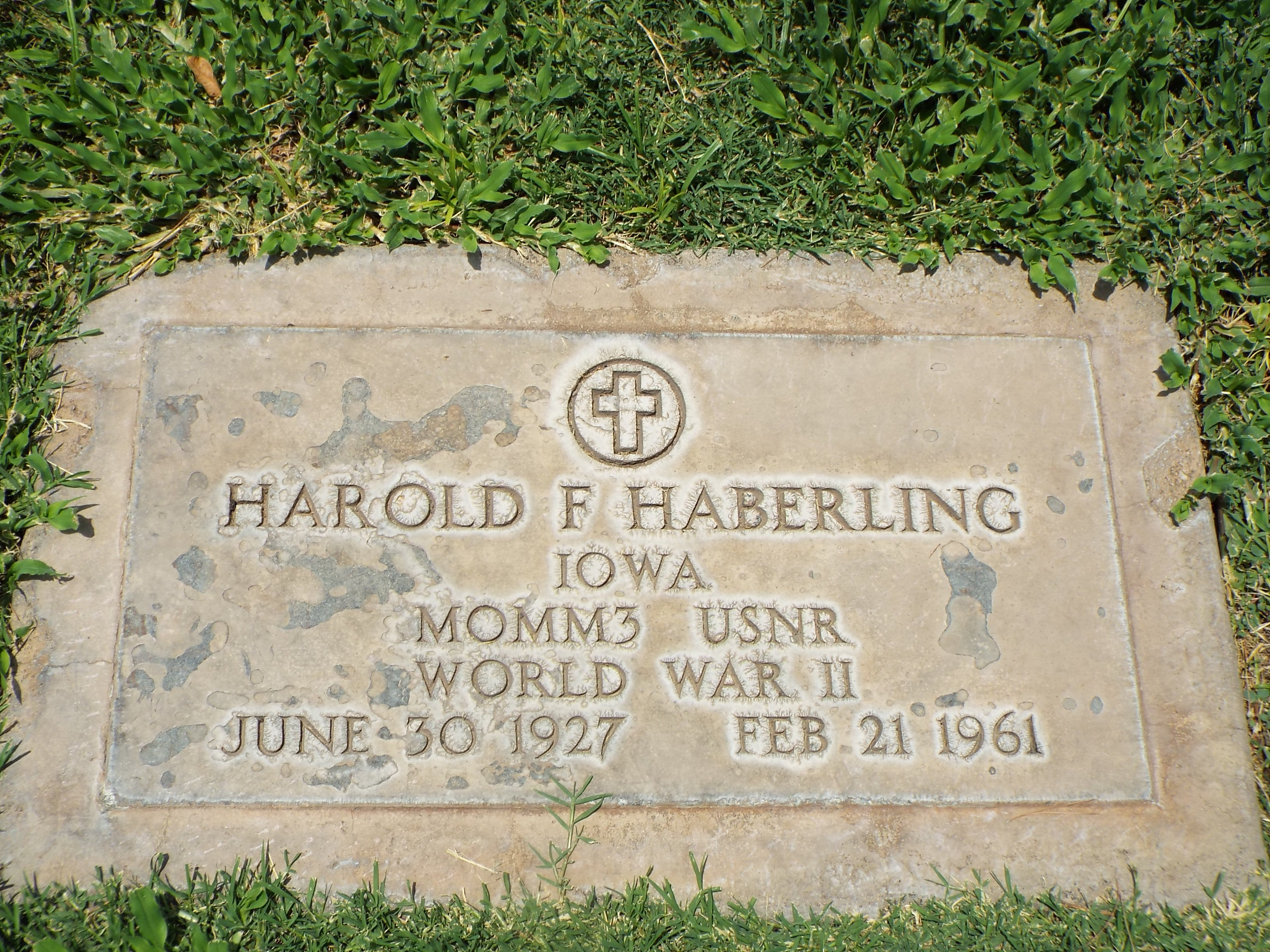
Grave-site of Harold F. Haberling (1927–1961).

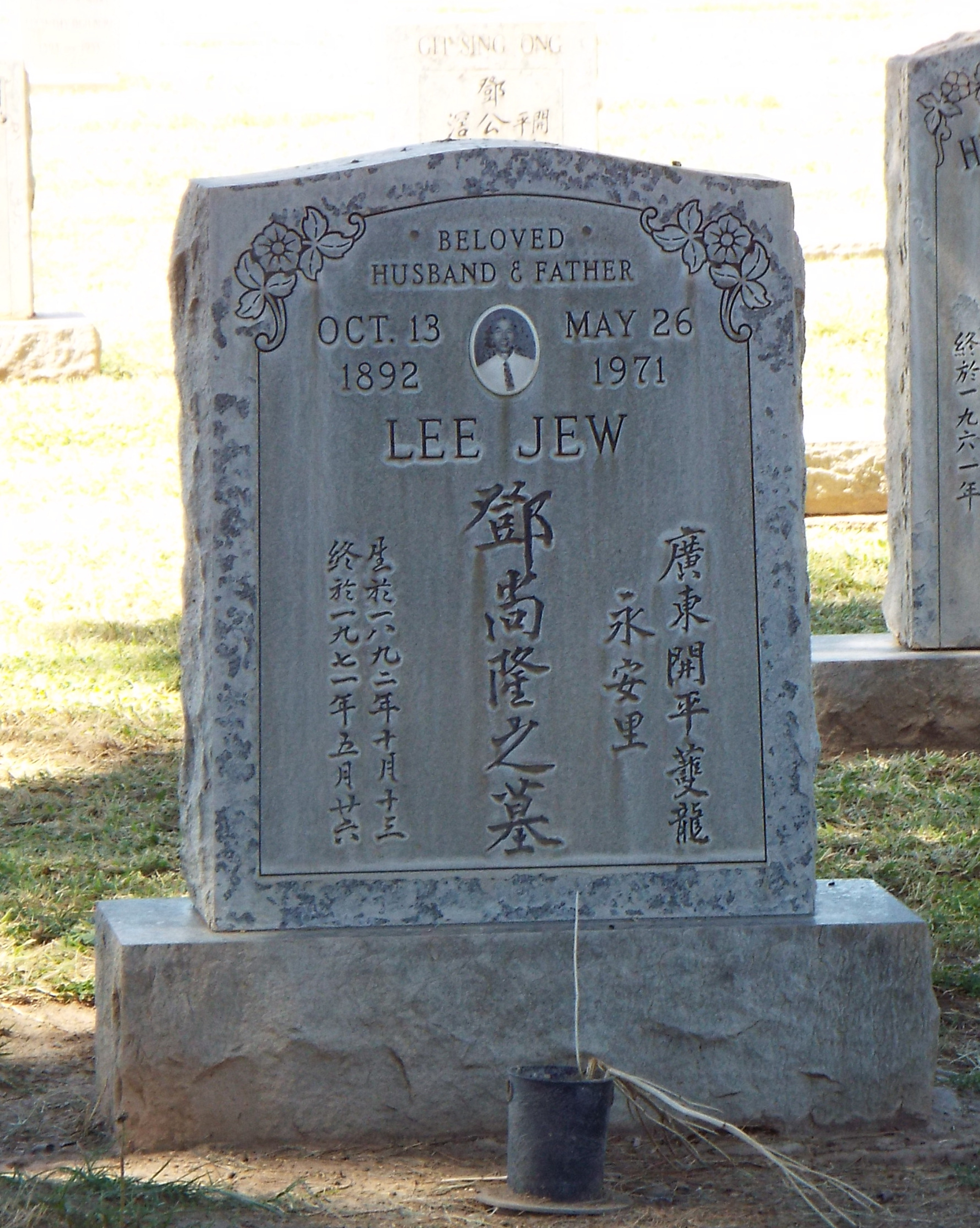
Grave-site of Lee Jew (1892–1971).

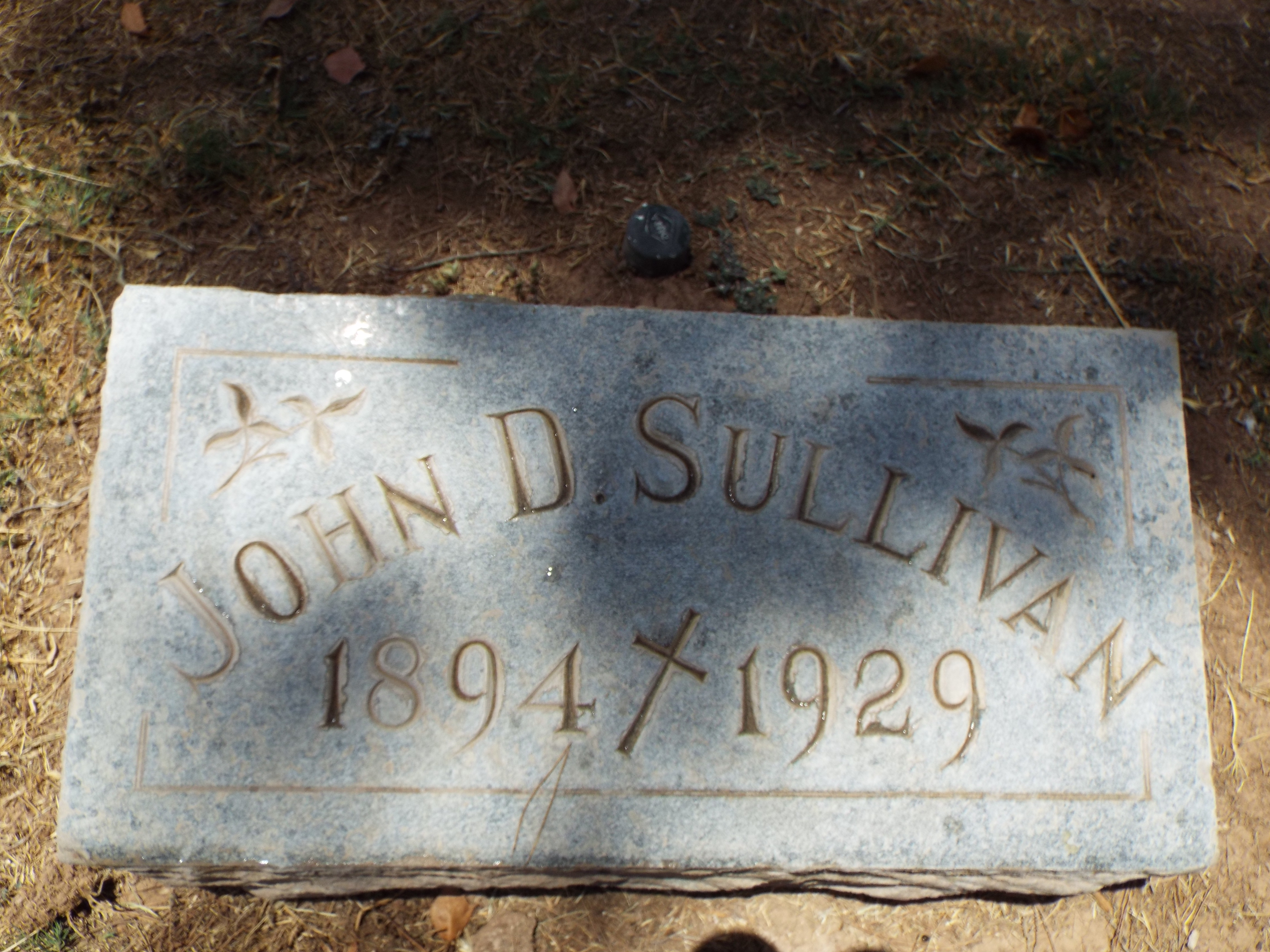
Grave-site of Captain John Daniel "Jack" Sullivan (1894–1929)

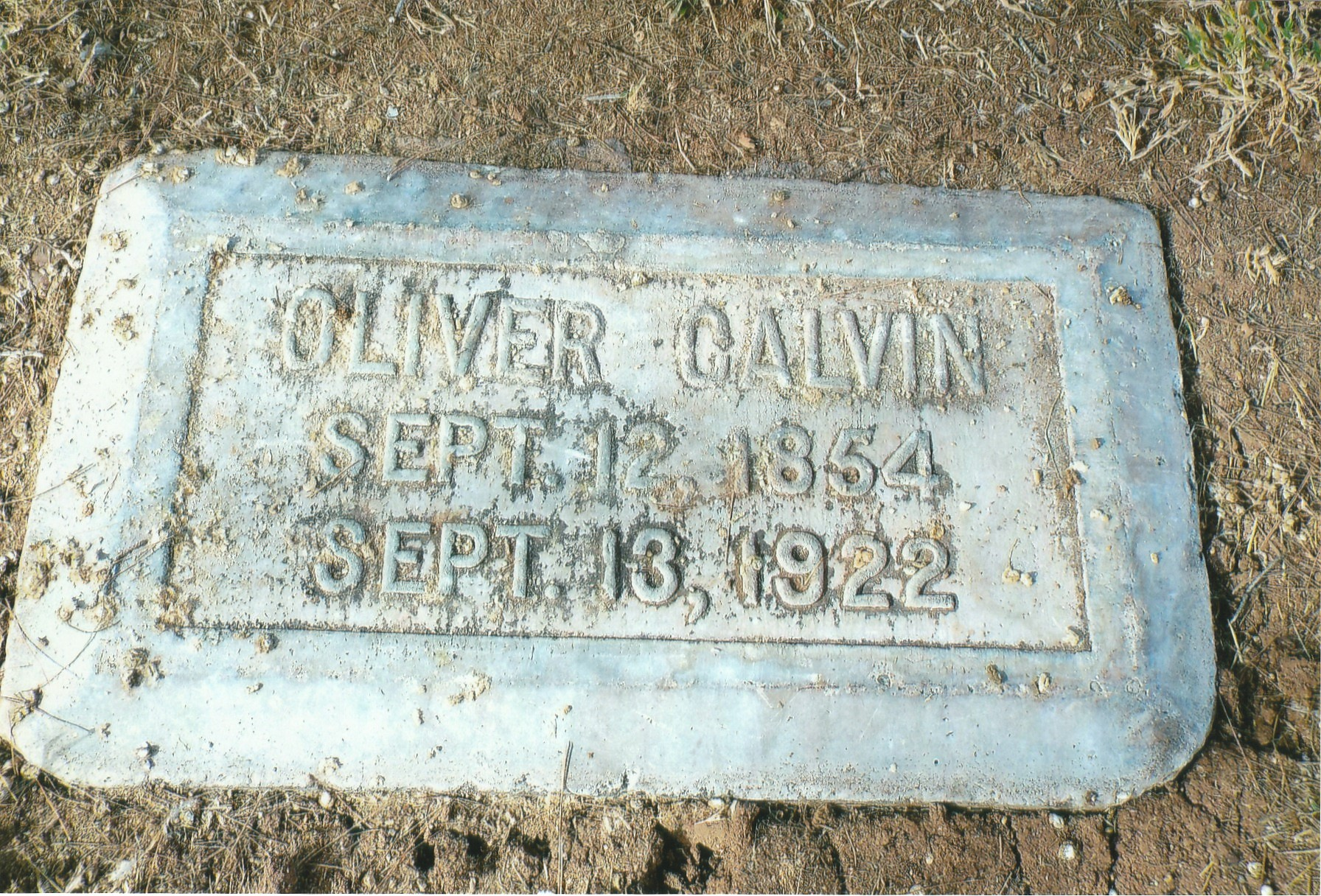
Grave-site of Oliver Calvin Thompson (1854–1922).

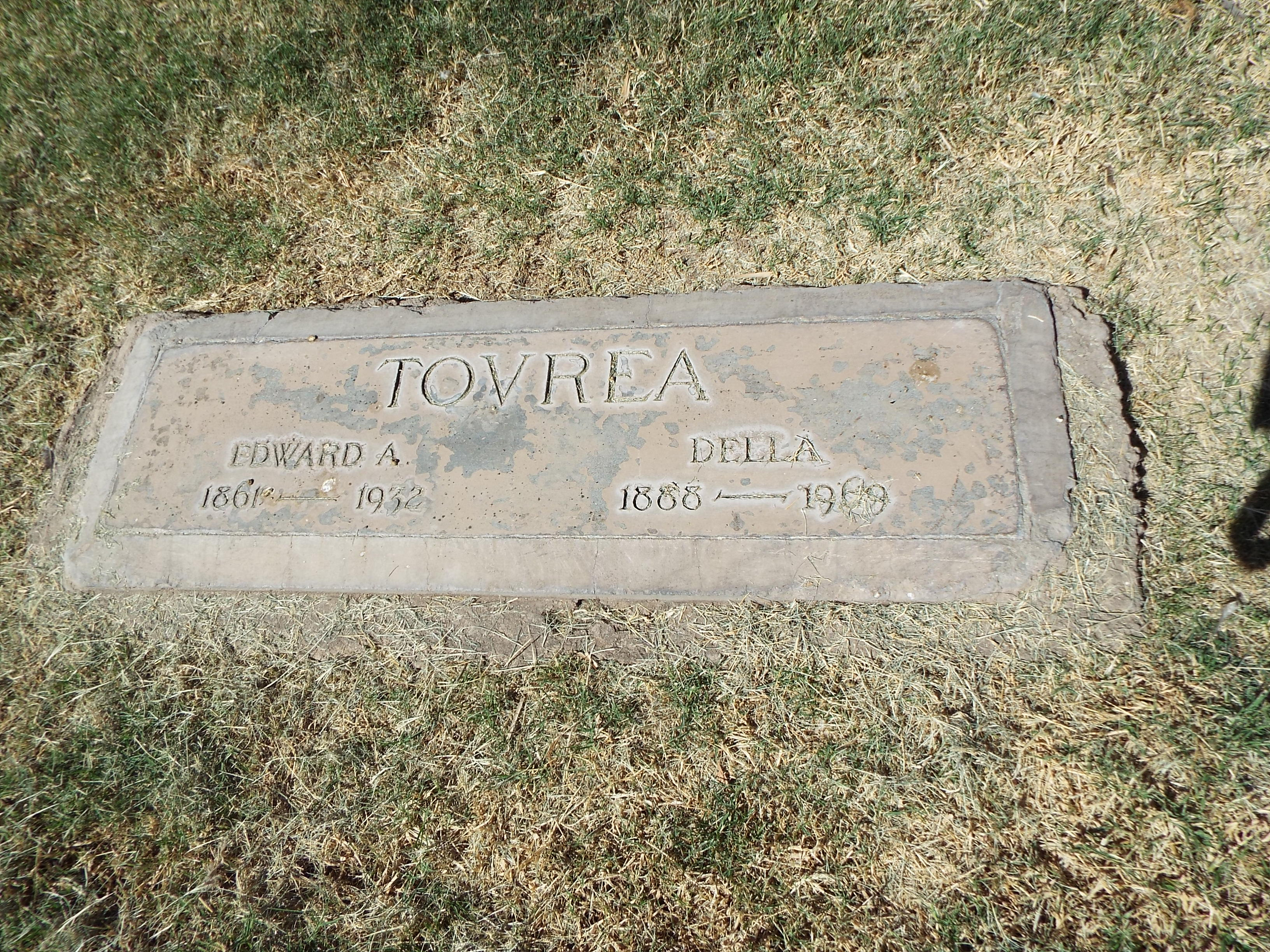
Grave-sites of Edward Ambrose Tovrea (1861–1932) and his wife Della Gillespie Tovrea (1888–1969).

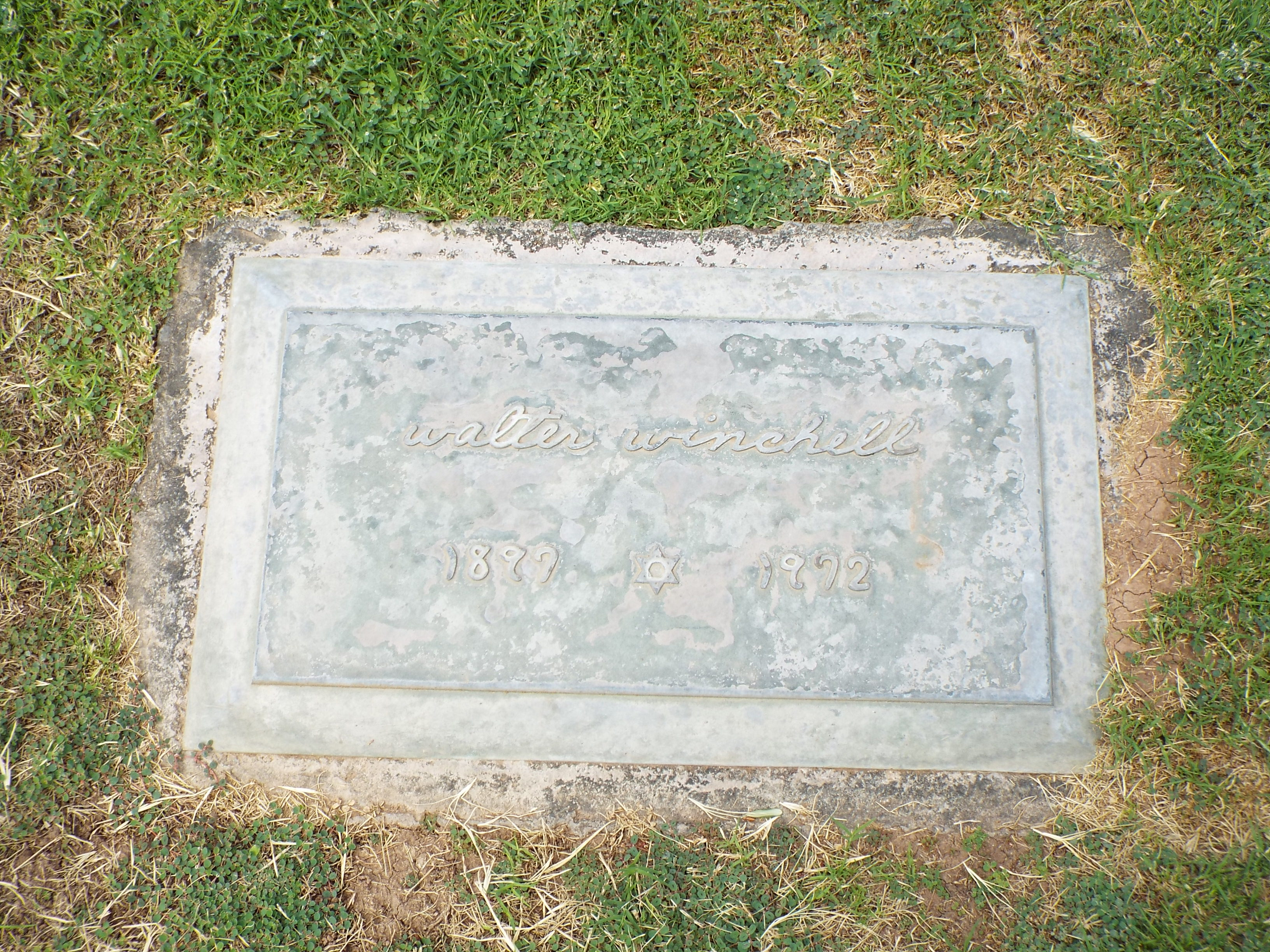
Grave-site of Walter Winchell (1897–1972).

== Associated historic properties ==
The following historic properties are associated with the notable people interred in the cemetery.

- Winstona Hackett Aldridge – Her house was designated as a landmark with Historic Preservation-Landmark (HP-L) overlay zoning. The house is listed on the Phoenix Historic Property Register.
- Clinton Campbell – The Campbell house was listed in the National Register of Historic Places on January 12, 1995, reference #94001526. It was demolished in 2017.
- Dr. Winston C. Hackett – Dr. Winston C. Hackett had six cottages built in the 1930s for his patients who were suffering from tuberculosis.
- Burgess Almond Hadsell – His house was listed in the National Register of Historic Places on January 12, 1995, reference #94001531.
- Dwight Bancroft Heard and his wife Maie Bartlett Heard – The Heard Building which housed the "Arizona Republic" was Phoenix's first skyscraper. The building, which was listed in the National Register of Historic Places on September 4, 1985, reference: #85002059, was featured in Alfred Hitchcocks 1960 film "Psycho". Heard, together with his wife Maie, founded the Heard Museum in 1929. The museum was listed in the Phoenix Historic Property Register in August 1992.
- Lee Jew – The Lee Jew Market building was built in 1931 and is located at 1501 East Washington Street. The building is listed as historical by the City of Phoenix Asian American Historic Property Survey.
- O.C. Thompson – The Thompson House was built in 1897 and is located at 850 N. 2nd Ave.. The building was converted to apartments long after O.C. Thompson and family moved out and now houses several office spaces. Designated as a landmark with Historic Preservation-Landmark (HP-L) overlay zoning..The house is listed as historic by the Phoenix Historic Property Register.
- William J. Murphy – Murphy's house is listed as historic by the Phoenix Historic Property Register.
- Dr. James Collier Norton House – Dr. Norton's house is listed as historic by the Phoenix Historic Property Register.
- William R. Norton House – The house is in a deteriorating condition. The house is listed as historic by the Phoenix Historic Property Register.
- George Henry Nicholas Luhrs Sr. – The Luhrs Hotel a.k.a. "The Luhrs Building" is a historic ten-story building built in 1924. It is located at 11 West Jefferson in downtown Phoenix, Arizona. Listed in the National Register of Historic Places
- Wing F. Ong – Ong's grocery store is listed in the Phoenix Historic Property Register.
- Lincoln Johnson Ragsdale Sr. – Ragsdale's house is recognized as historic by the City of Phoenix African-American Historic Property Survey.
- Dea Hong Toy – Toy's house is recognized as historic by the Asian American Historic Property Survey.
- Edward A. Tovrea – His Tovrea Land and Cattle Co. Administration Buildingy was listed in the Phoenix Historic Property Register in March 2004. The house where he and his wife Della lived "The Tovrea Castle" is listed on the National Register of Historic Places on Oct. 1, 1996.
- Dr. Lowell Wormley – Wormley's house was listed in the Phoenix Historic Property Register in June 2005.
Historic properties associated with notable people interred in the cemetery
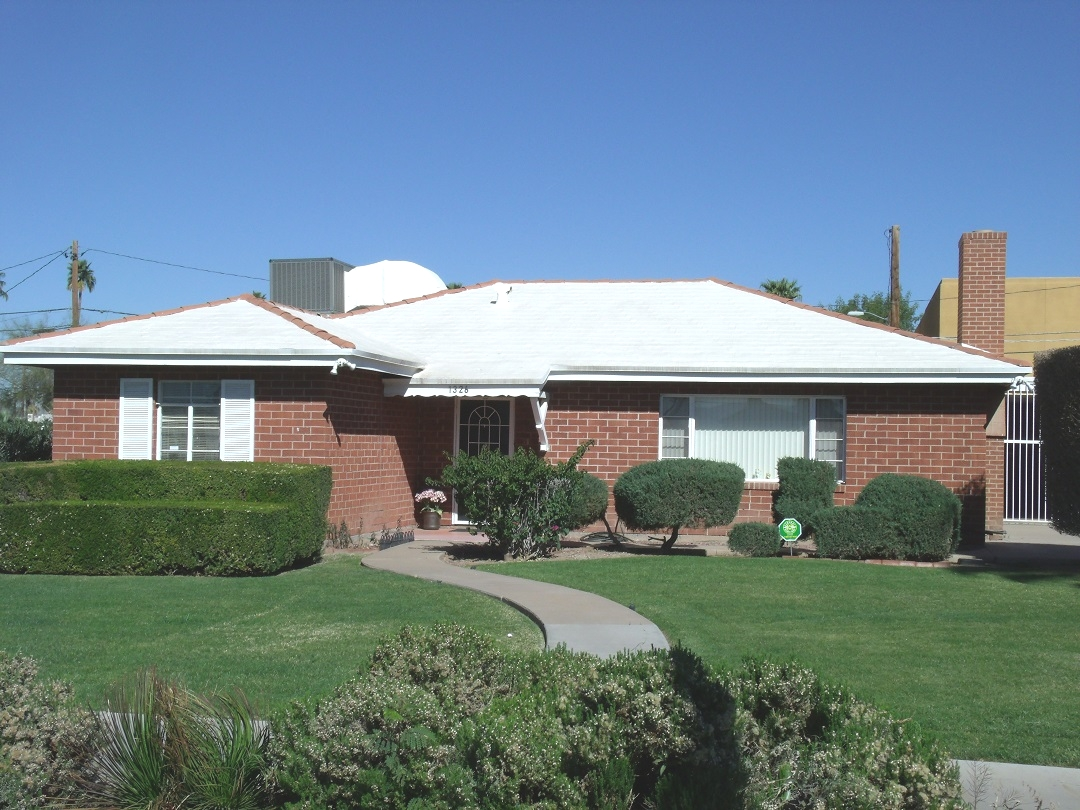
The Winstona Hackett Aldridge House.

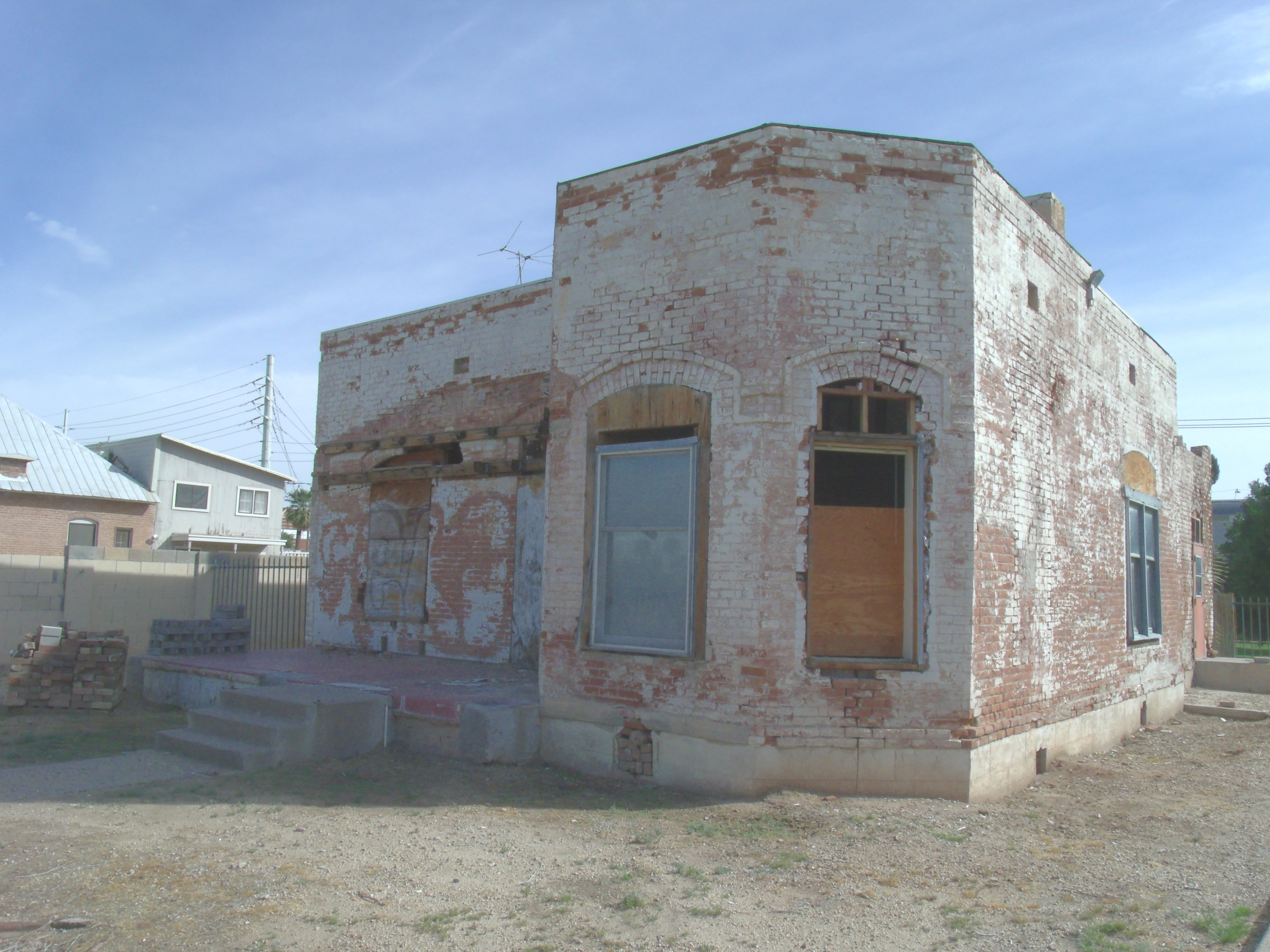
The Clinton Campbell House.

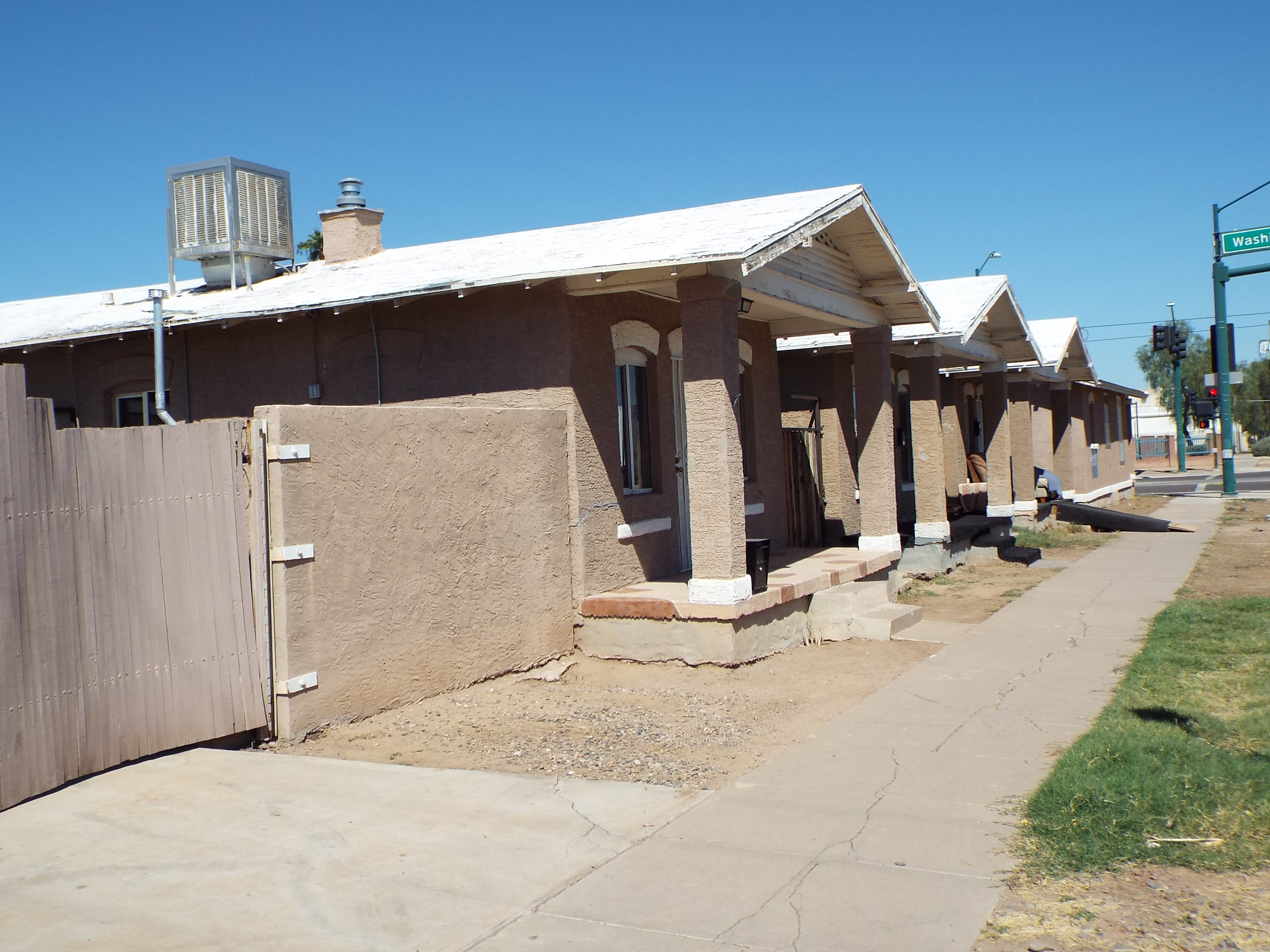
Three of Dr. Winston C. Hackett's cottages.

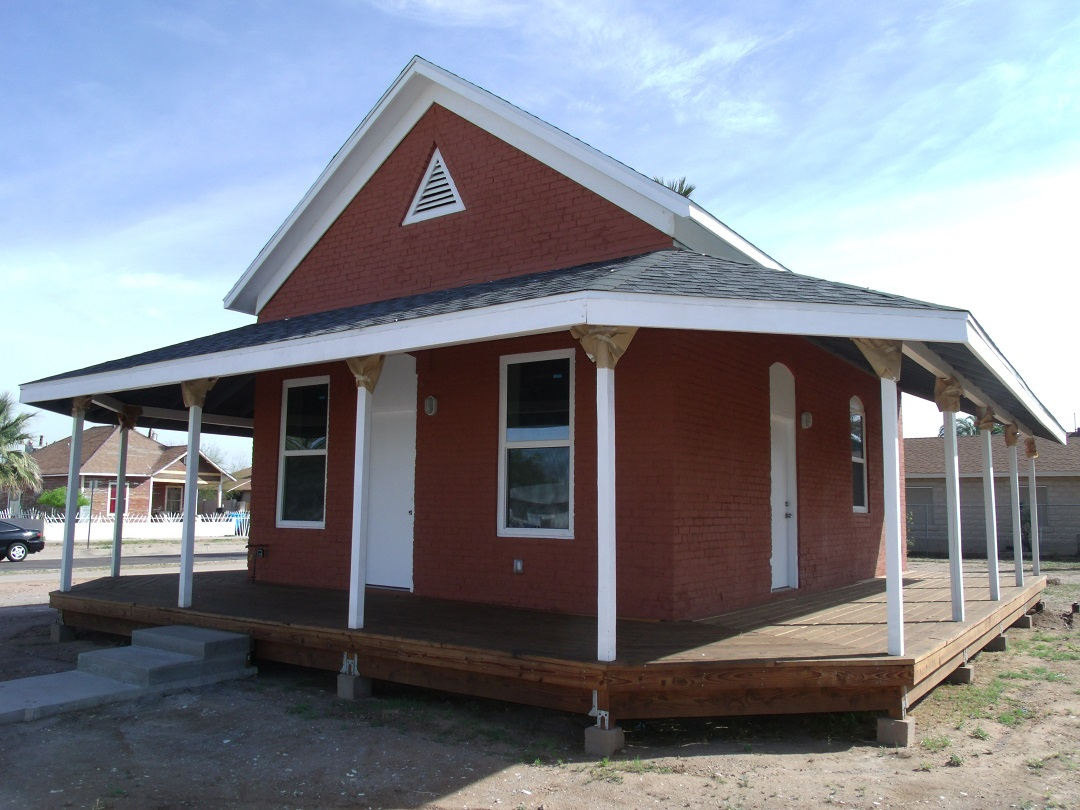
The Burgess A. Hadsell House.

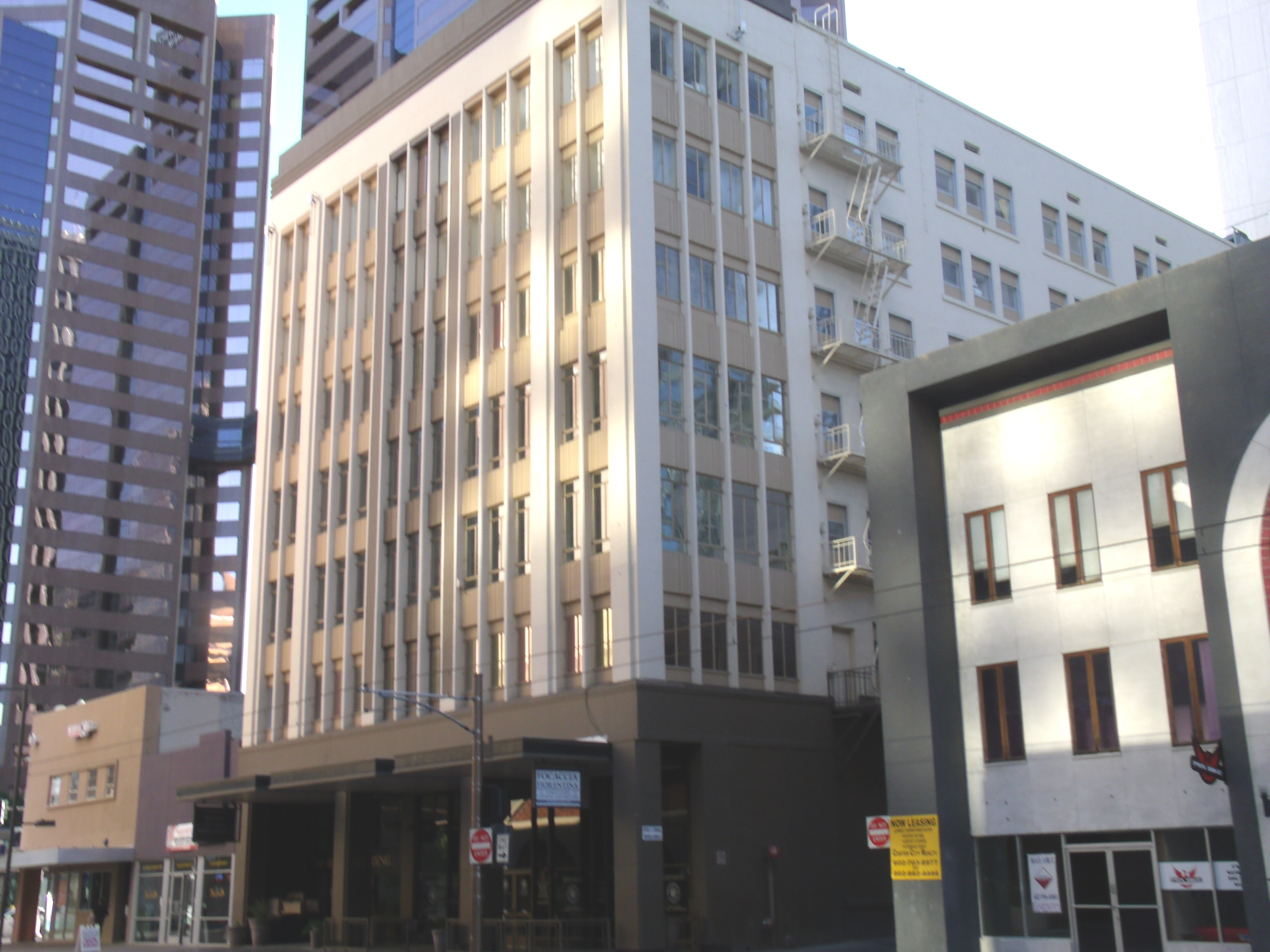
The Heard Building.

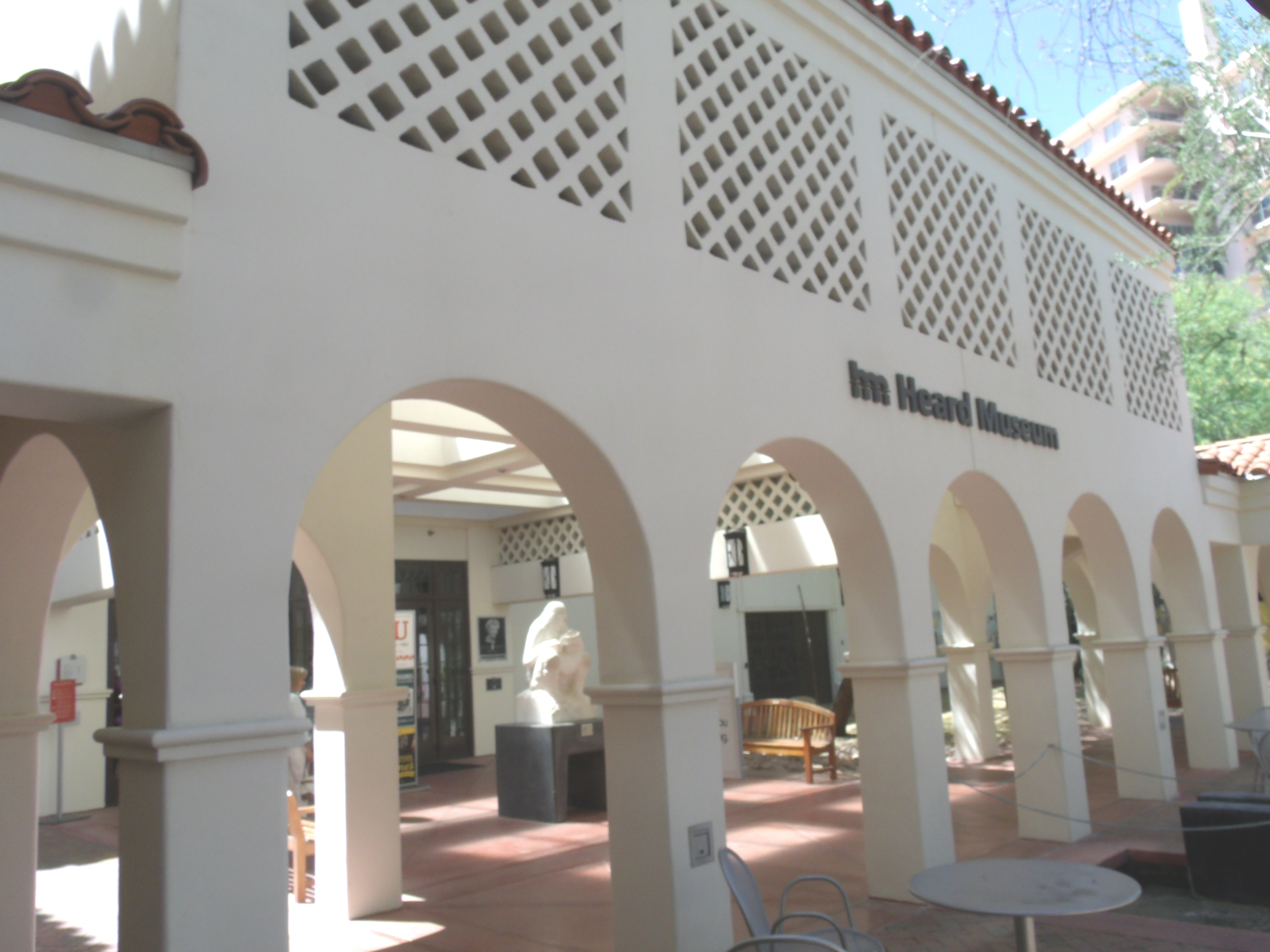
The Heard Museum.

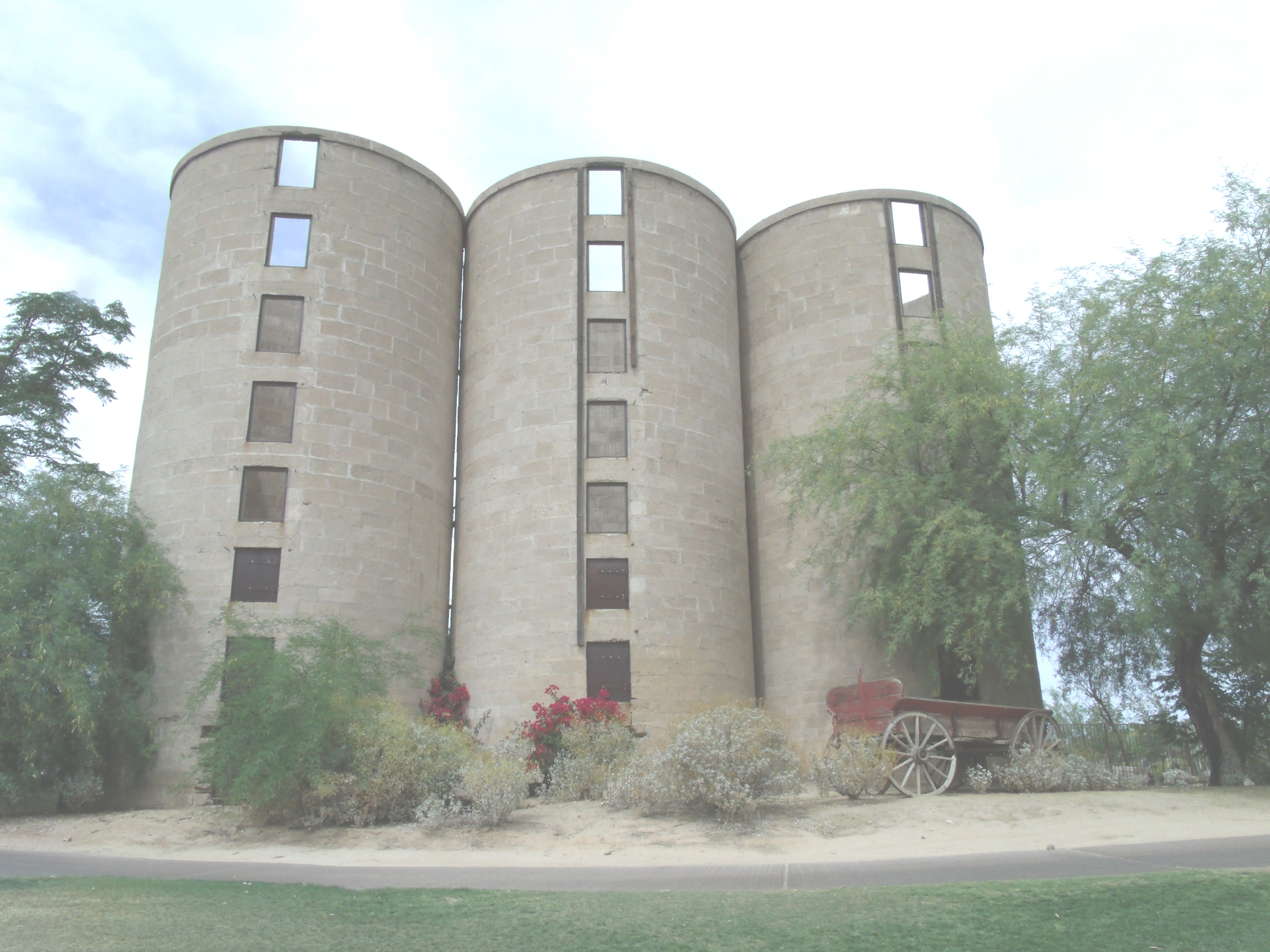
The Heard Ranch Grain Silos.

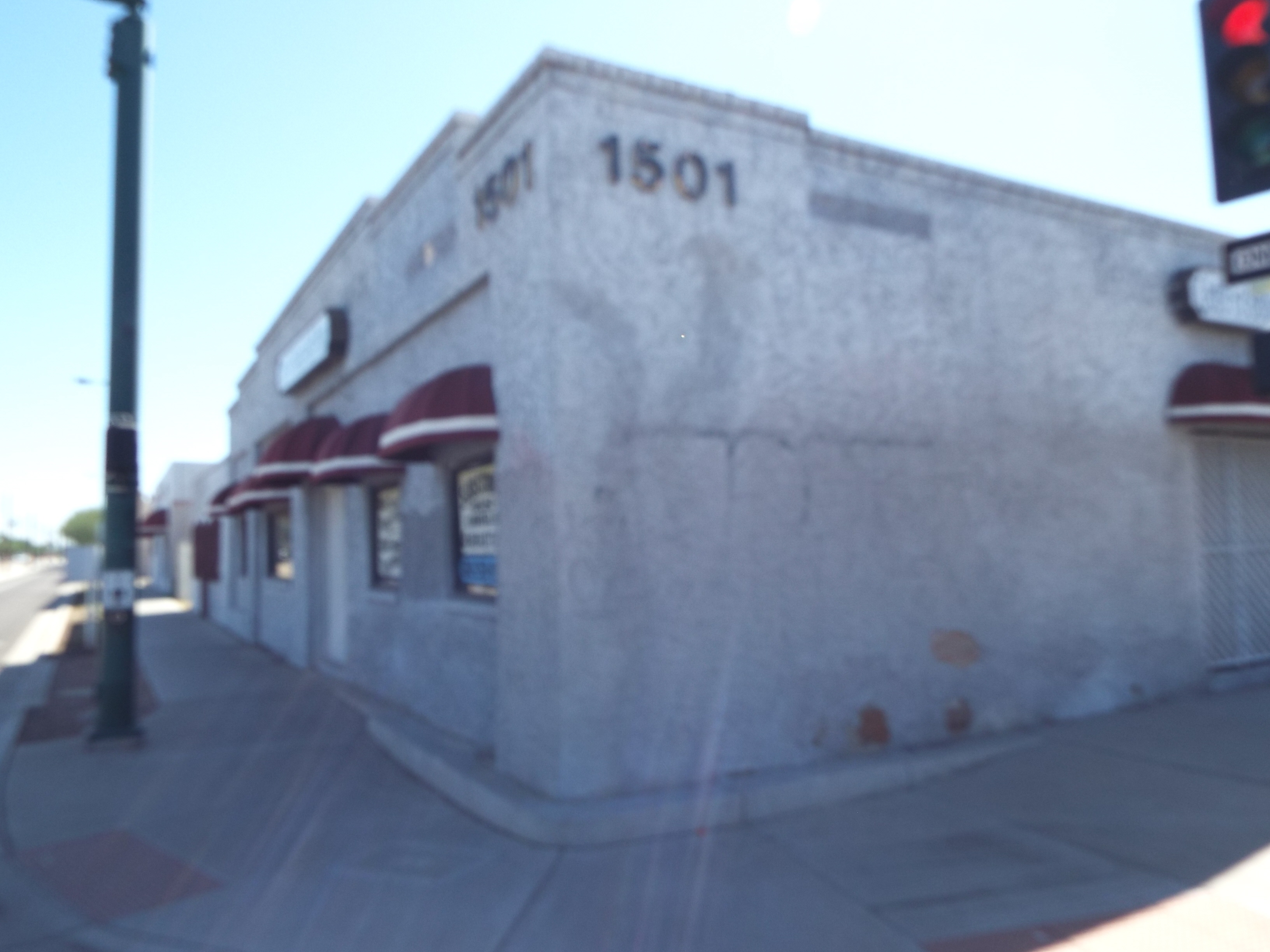
The Lee Jew Market.

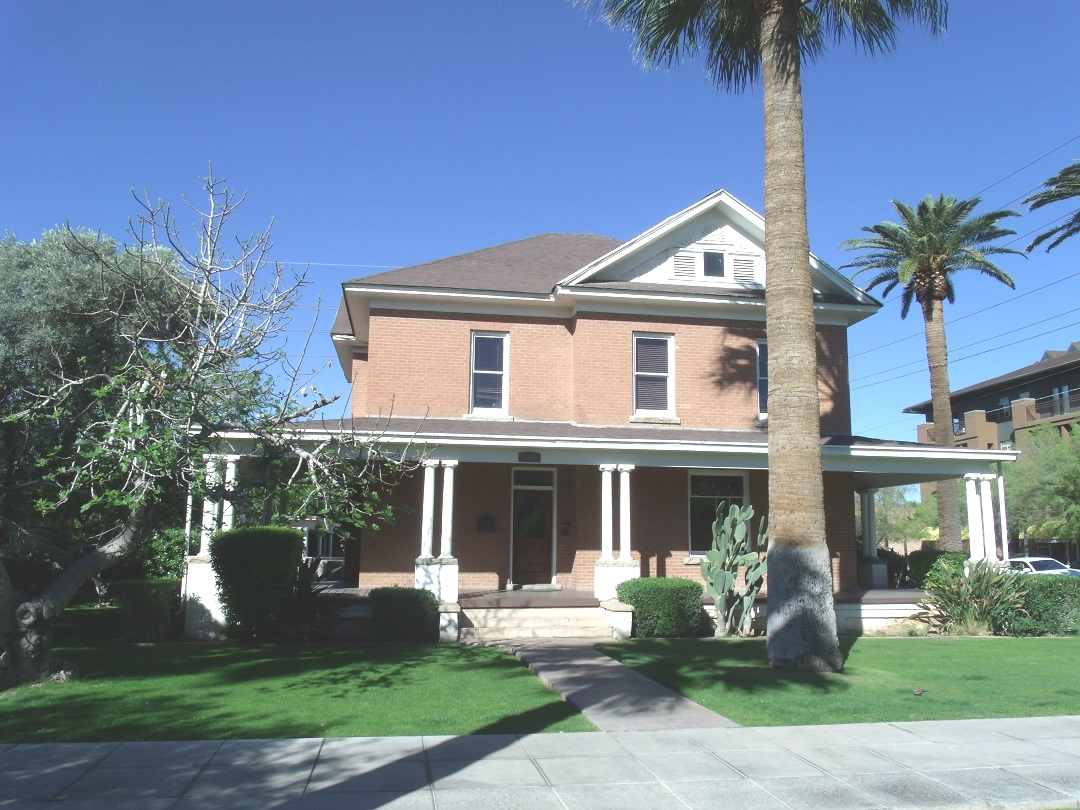
The O.C. Thompson House.;

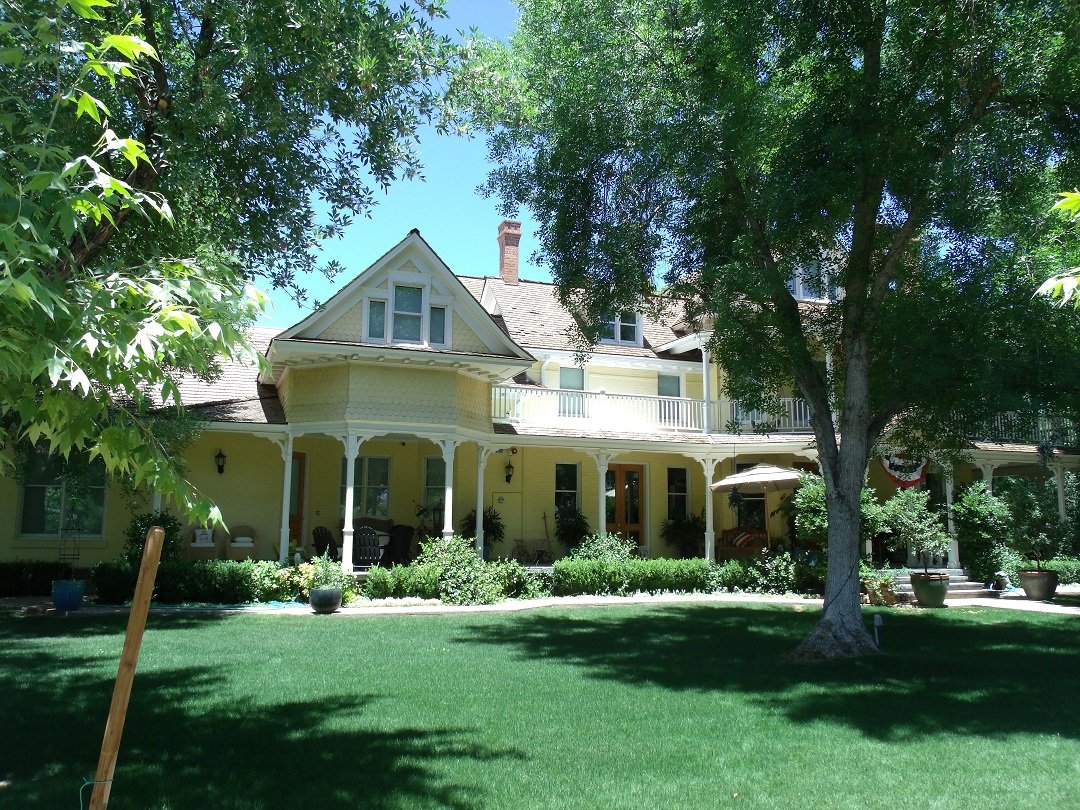
The William John Murphy House.

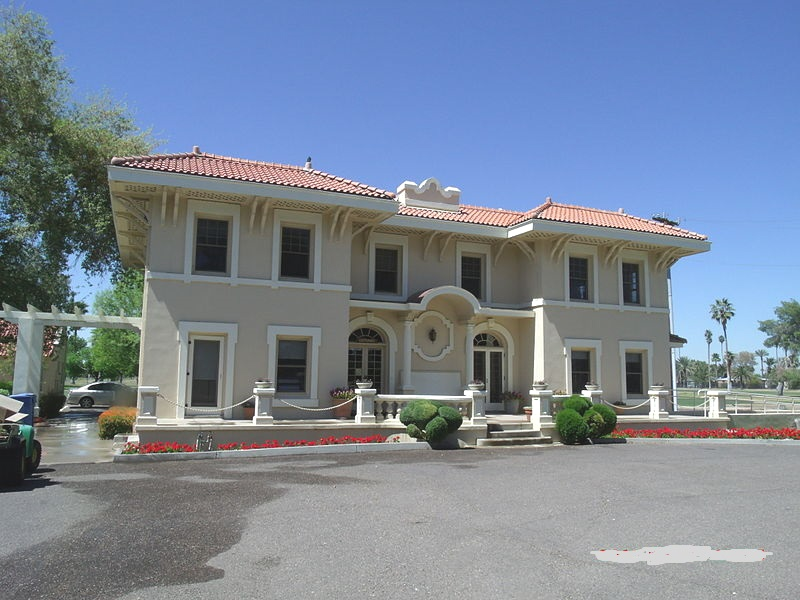
The Dr. Norton House.

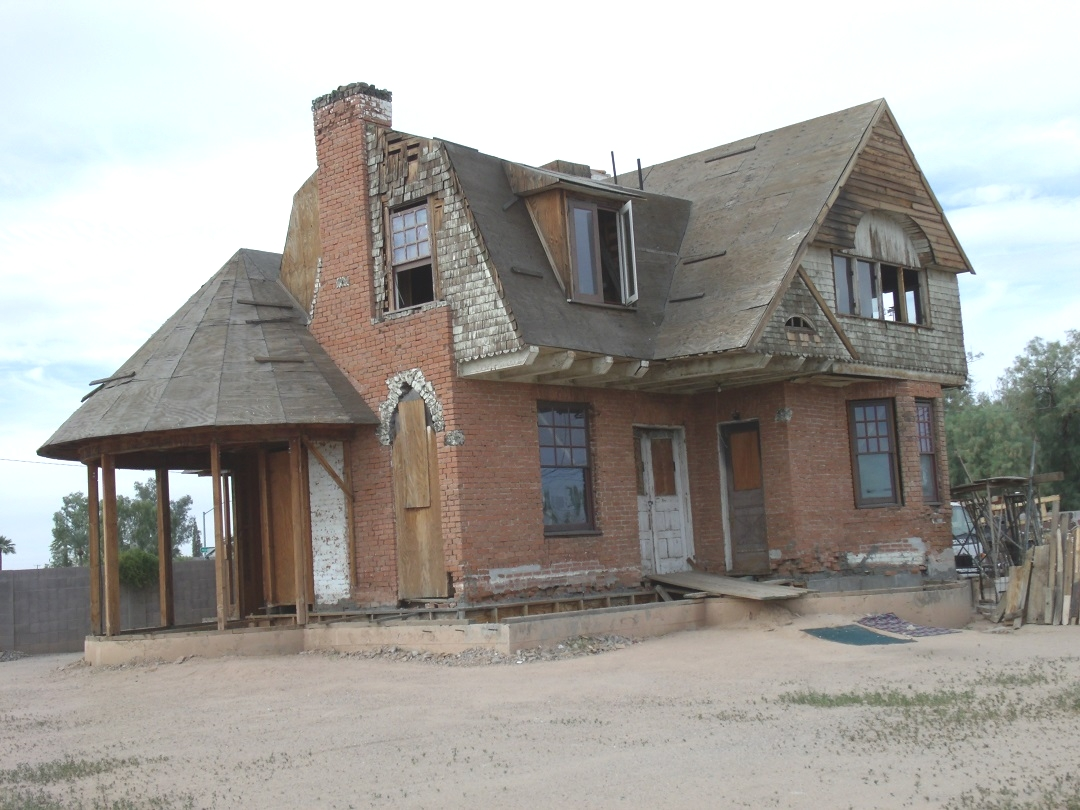
The William R. Norton House.

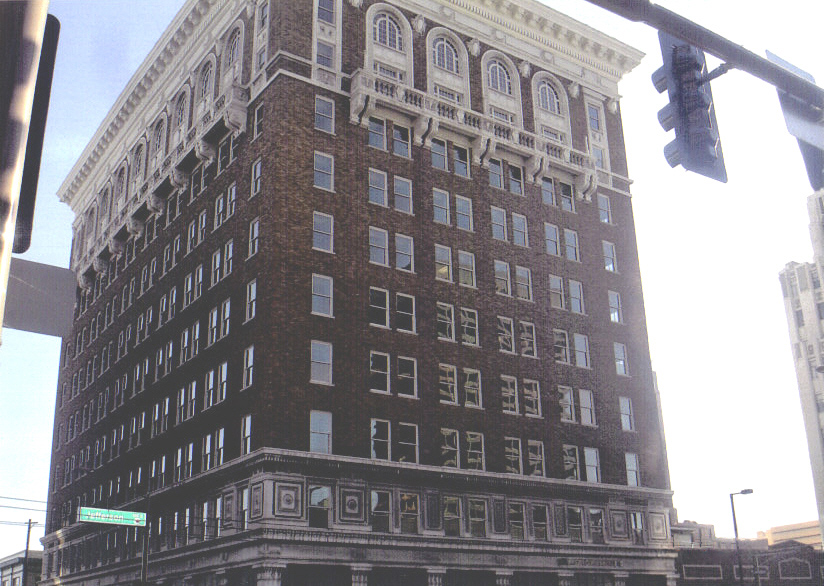
The Luhrs Hotel/Building is an historic ten-story building built in 1924. It is located at 11 West Jefferson in downtown Phoenix, Arizona. Listed in the National Register of Historic Places

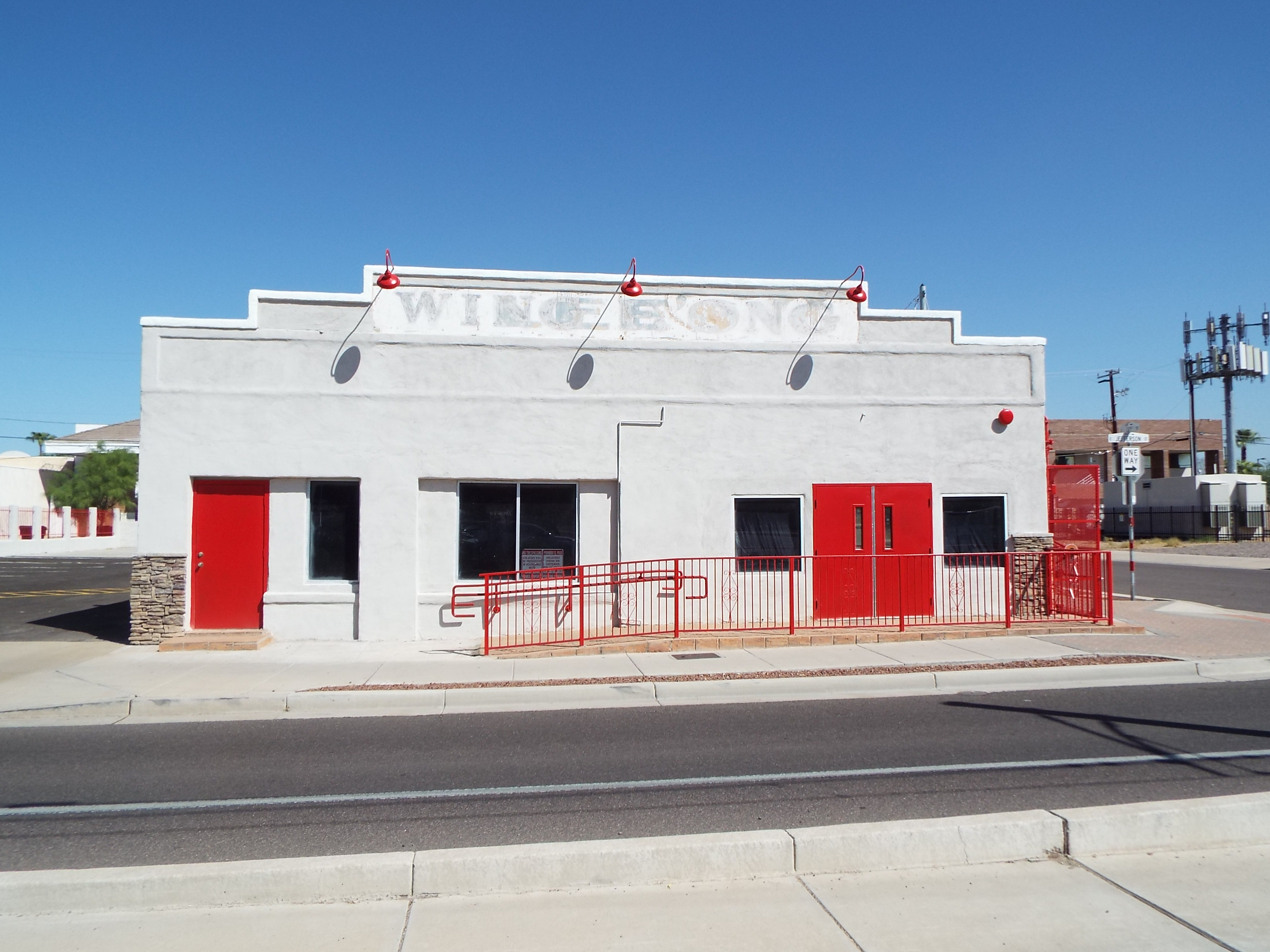
The Wing F. Ong Grocery Store.

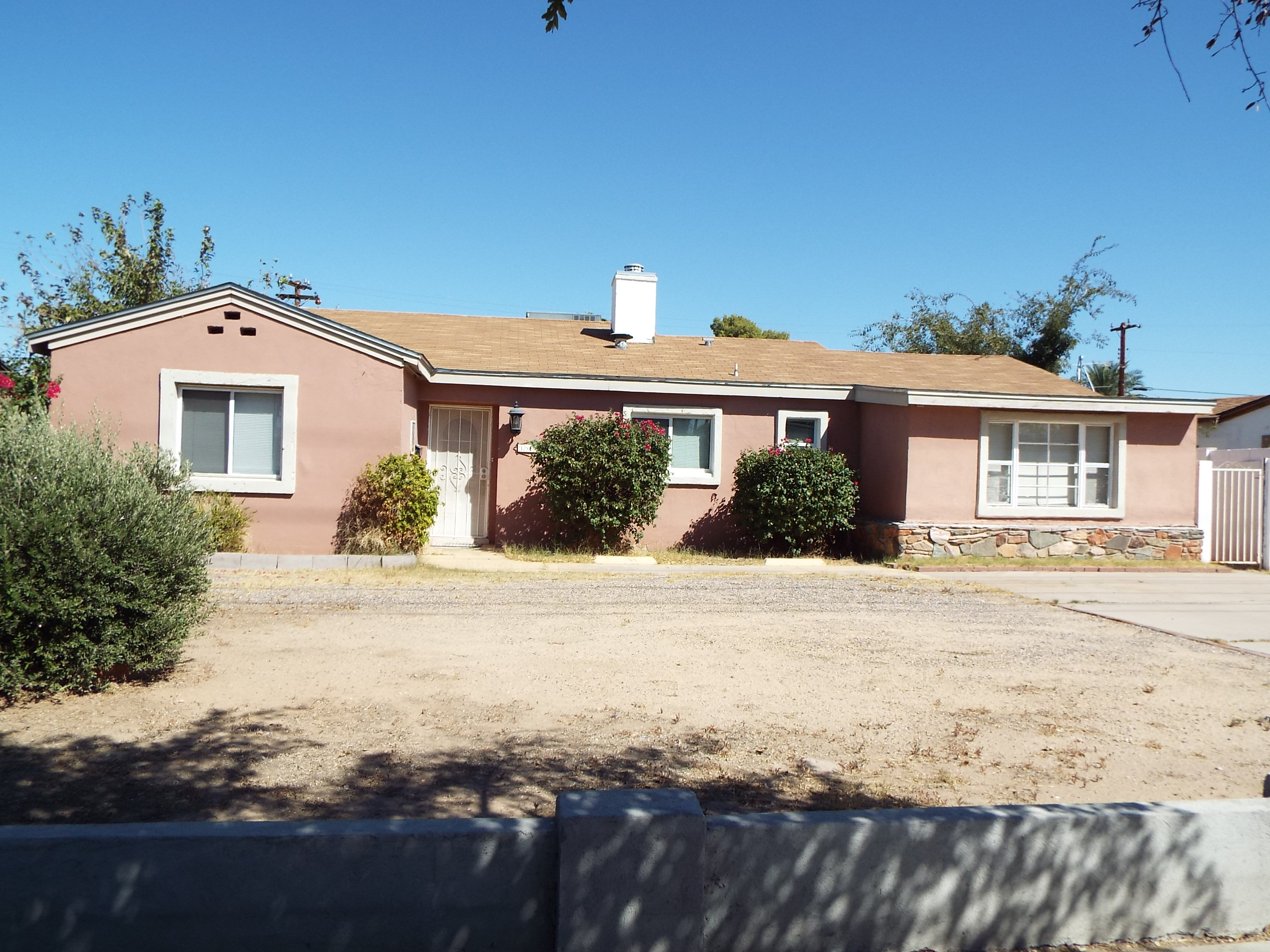
The house of Dr. Lincoln Johnson Ragsdale and Mrs. Eleanor Ragsdale.

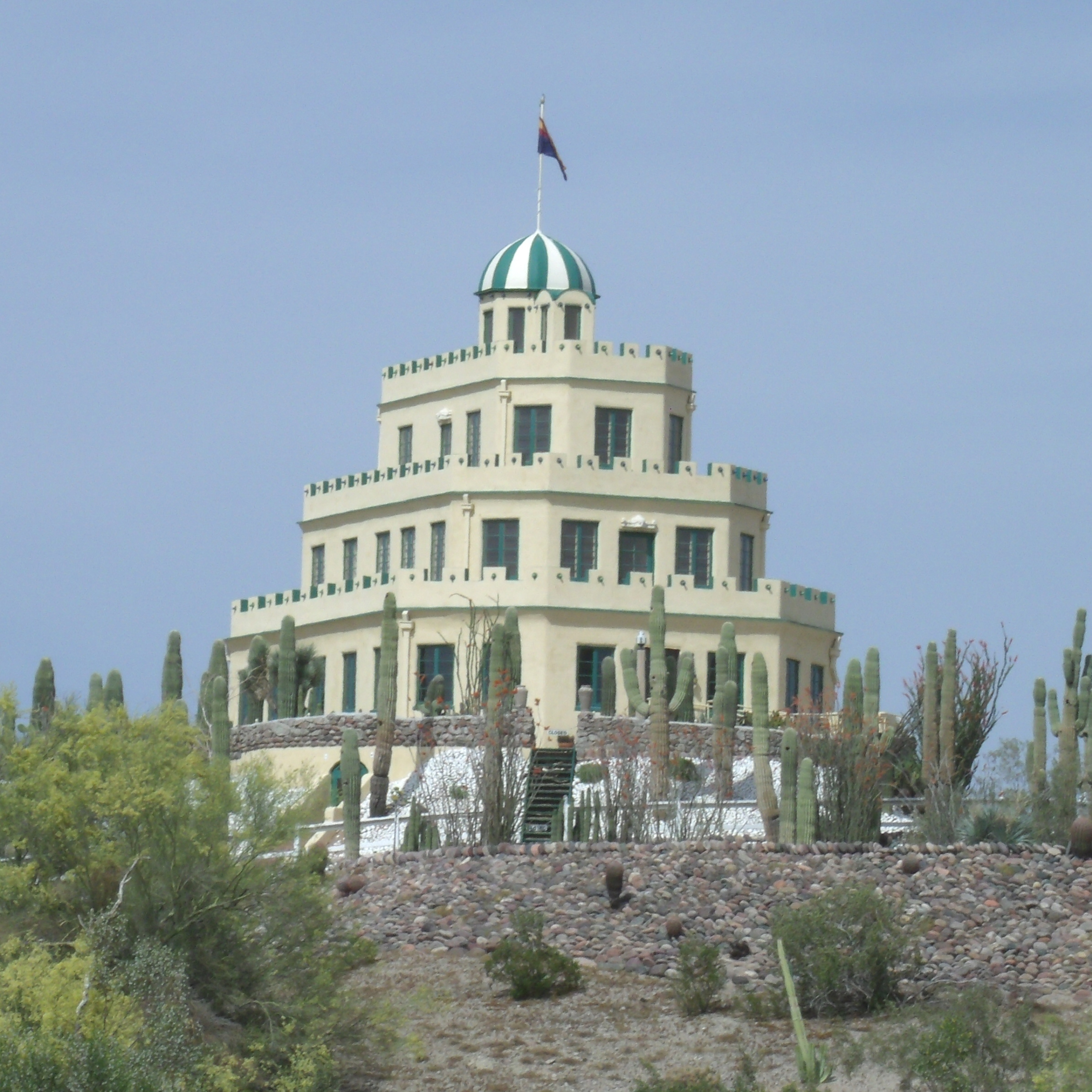
The Tovrea Castle

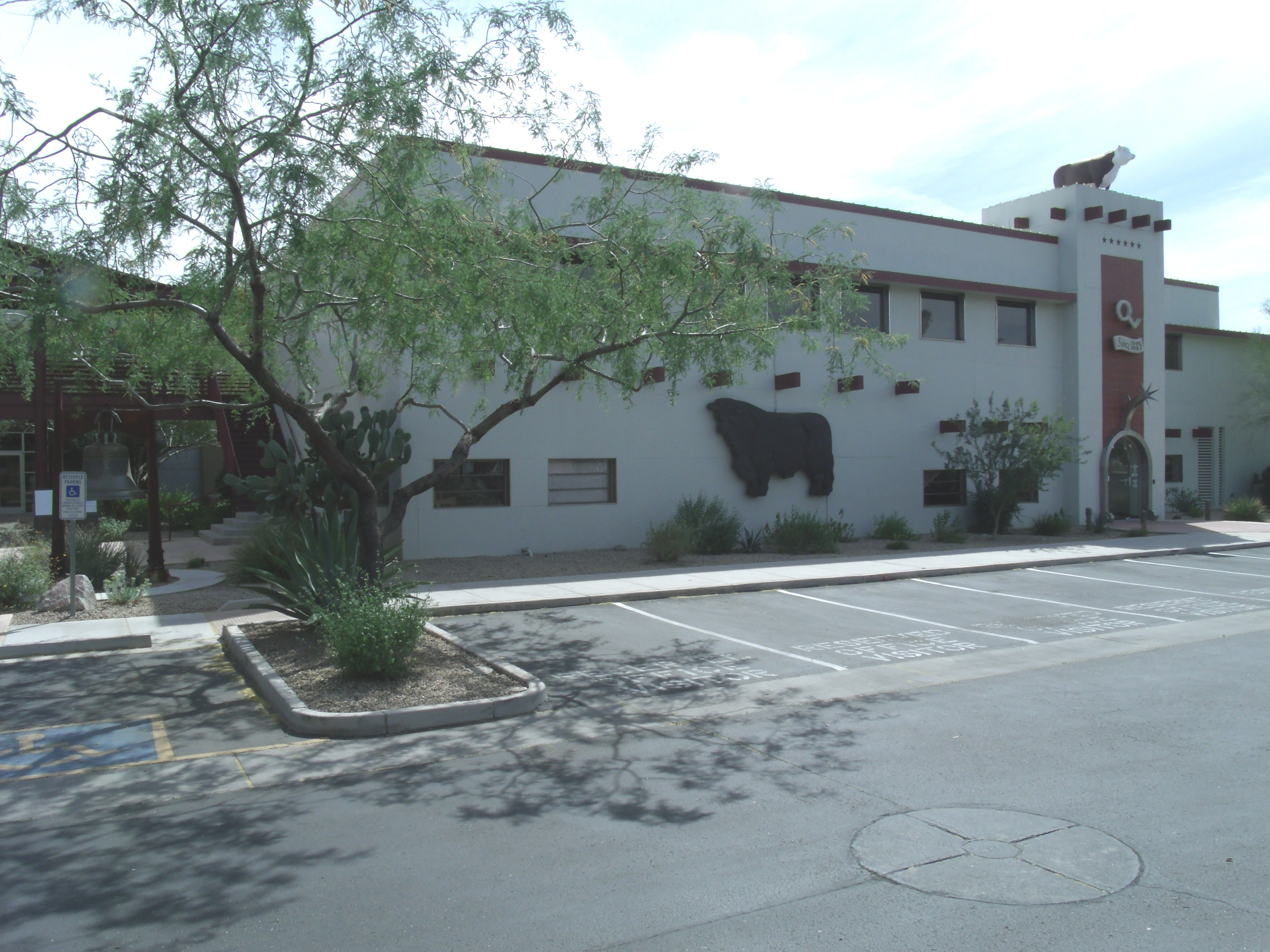
The Tovrea Land and Cattle Co. Administration Building / Stockyards Restaurant.

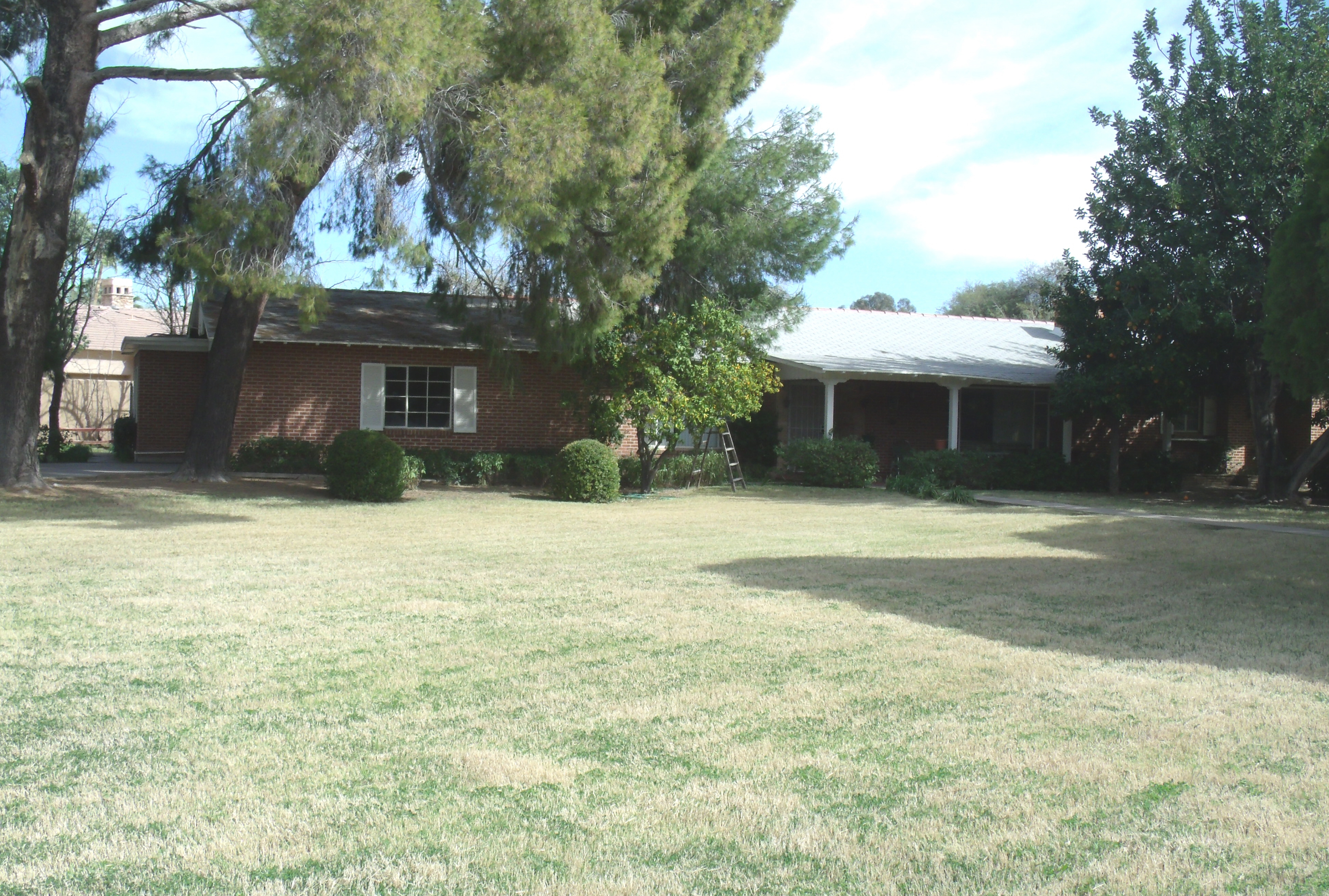
The Dea Hong Toy House .

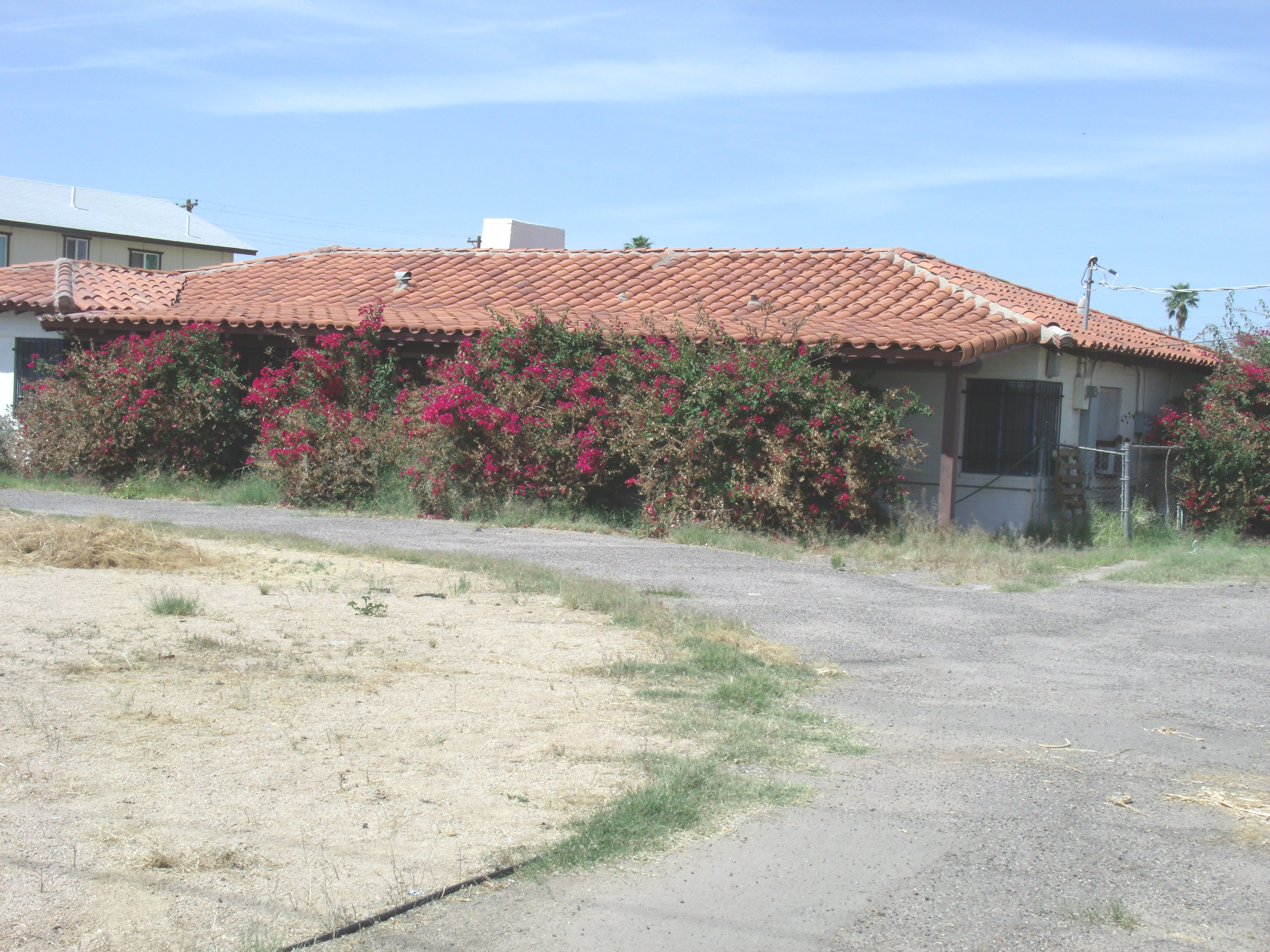
The Dr. Lowell Wormley House.

== See also ==
- List of historic properties in Phoenix, Arizona
- Adamsville A.O.U.W. Cemetery
- City of Mesa Cemetery
- Double Butte Cemetery
- Glendale Memorial Park Cemetery
- Goodyear Farms Historic Cemetery
- Home Mission Cemetery
- Pioneer and Military Memorial Park
- St. Francis Catholic Cemetery
- Historic Pinal Cemetery
- National Register of Historic Places listings in Maricopa County, Arizona
