= Jacaranda (disambiguation) =

Jacaranda is a genus for 49 different species of flowering plants.

Jacaranda also may refer to:

- Jacaranda mimosifolia, a sub-tropical tree known for its blue/purple flowers
- Pretoria, known as the Jacaranda City
- Jacaranda, University of Sydney, a famous specimen in the main quadrangle of the University of Sydney
- Floresta do Jacarandá Environmental Protection Area, state of Rio de Janeiro, Brazil
- Jacaranda FM, previously Jacaranda 94.2, South African radio station in English and Afrikaans
- Jacaranda Foundation, American/Malawian grassroots organization founded in 2002
- Jacaranda Music, classical music concert organization
- The Jacaranda, British bar and music venue in Liverpool, United Kingdom
  - Jacaranda Records, record shop and live music operator based out of The Jacaranda
- Jacaranda Books, diversity-led British independent book publishing firm
- Jacaranda Software, Australian developer and publisher of educational computer games
- Jacarandá River, a river of Espírito Santo state, Brazil
- Jacaranda (Trevor Rabin album), 2012
- Jacarandá (Luiz Bonfá album), 1973, or the title song
- "Jacarandá" (song), by Ana Moura, 2022
- "Jacaranda", a song by Bad Gyal

== See also ==
- The Purple Jacaranda, Australian television miniseries
