= Goldfield =

Goldfield or Goldfields may refer to:

== Places ==
- Goldfield, Arizona, the former name of Youngberg, Arizona, a populated place in the United States
- Goldfield, Colorado, a community in the United States
- Goldfield, Iowa, a city in the United States
- Goldfield, Nevada, a town in Esmeralda Country, United States
- Gold Fields (New Zealand electorate)
- Goldfields, Queensland, a locality in the Southern Downs Region, Australia
- Goldfields, Saskatchewan, an abandoned hamlet in Canada

== Actual fields of gold ==
An area where gold mining occurs or has historically occurred:

- Goldfields region of Victoria, Australia
- Kolar Gold Fields, a major gold mine in India
- Western Australian Goldfields, a term for areas in Western Australia where gold mining has occurred at any time
  - Goldfields–Esperance, an officially-designated region of Western Australia
  - Eastern Goldfields, part of the Western Australian Goldfields in the Goldfields-Esperance region
  - Places designated as Gold Fields or Mineral fields of Western Australia
- Goldfields (Victoria)
- Transvaal gold fields, mining during the 19th century in the South African Republic
- West African gold fields
- Lena gold fields, gold fields near the Lena River in Russia
- Lupa Gold Field in Tanzania
- Pikes Peak gold field
- California gold fields
- Klondike gold fields

== Companies ==
- Ashanti Goldfields Corporation, the former name of AngloGold Ashanti
- Consolidated Gold Fields, a British gold-mining company
- European Goldfields, a company operating in the EU
- Gold Fields, a South African gold mining company
- New Consolidated Gold Fields, an Estonian shale oil company
- Goldfields Raceway, a former racetrack in South Africa

== Other uses ==
- Goldfield (cigarette), a brand of cigarette
- Goldfields (video game), a 1986 educational game
- SS Goldfield, a Panamanian steamship
- David Goldfield, historian
- Lasthenia californica, flower commonly known as California goldfields

== See also ==
- Goldfeld (disambiguation)
