= List of historic properties in Goldfield, Arizona =

- Ghost Town
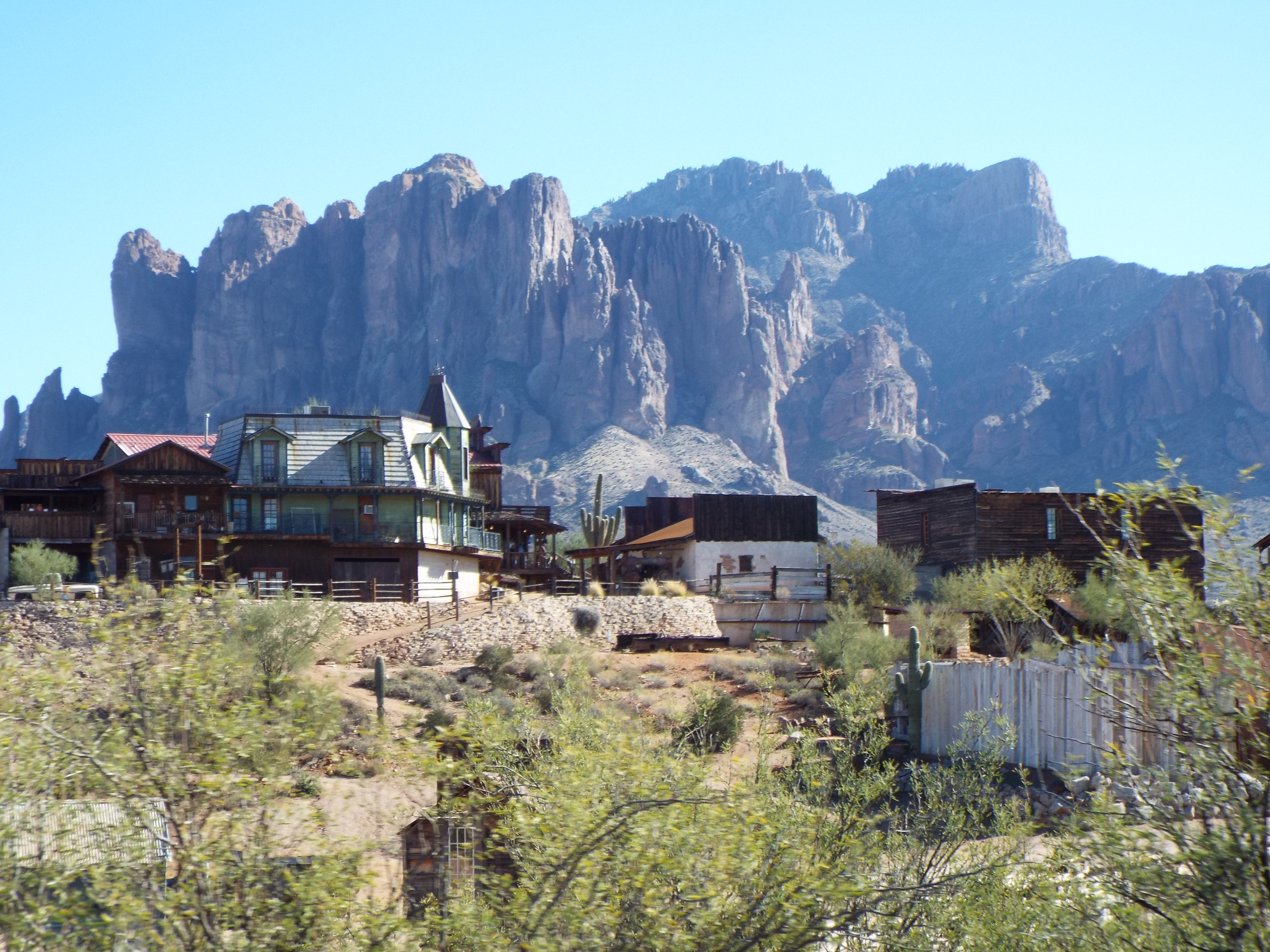
- Goldfield with the Superstition Mountains in the background

- Location in Maricopa County and the state of Arizona

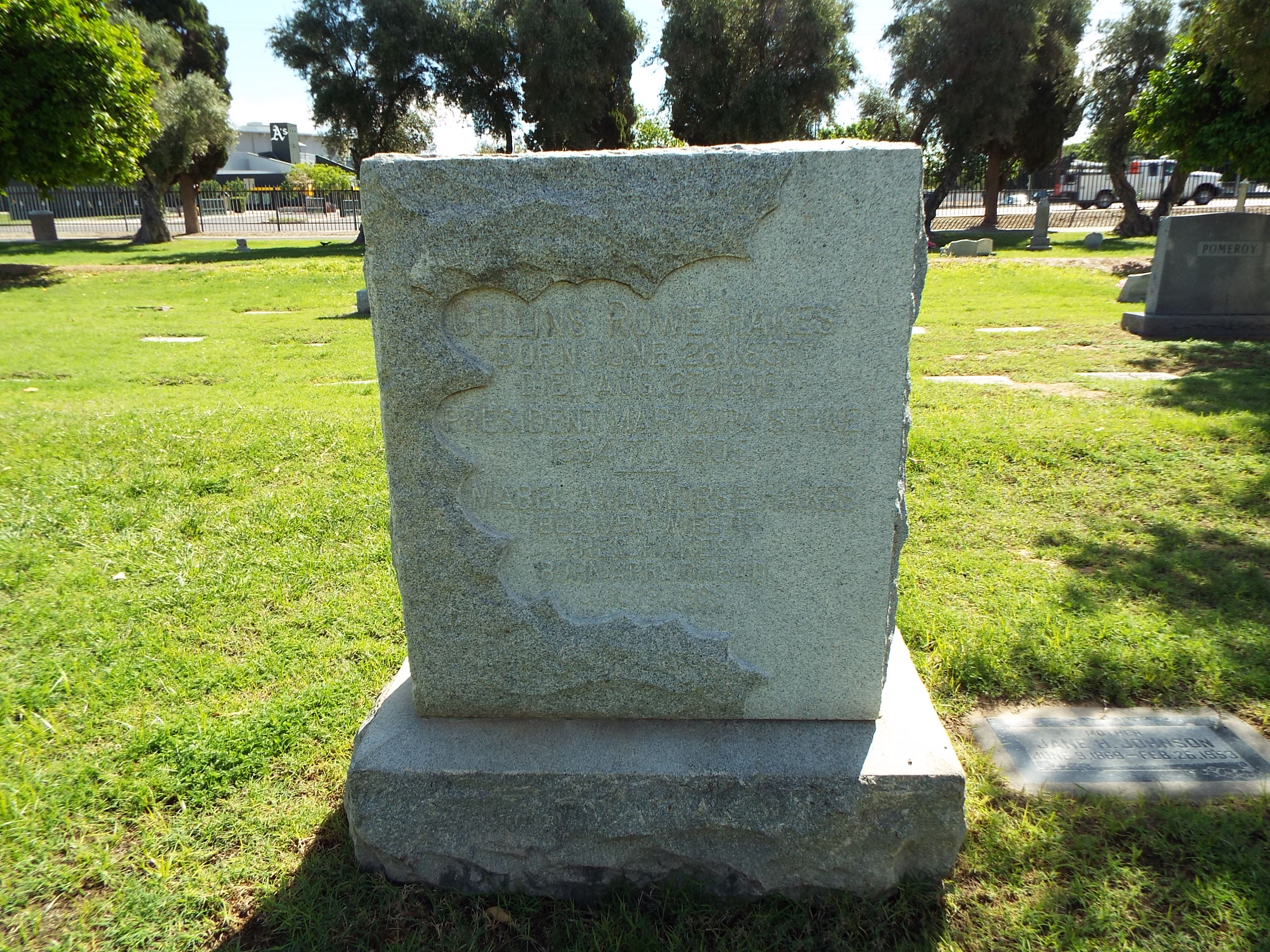
Graves of Collins Rowes Hakes (1837–1916) and his wife Mabel Ana Morse Hakes (1840–1909)

This article catalogs the historic properties in the mining town of Goldfield, Arizona. The town was originally known as Goldfield, later renamed to Youngberg and again named Goldfield by the current owners. The list below highlights a photographic gallery of some of the town's historic structures—all of which were either restored or rebuilt. The town was founded in 1893, after the discovery of gold in the surrounding area of the Superstition Mountains. The town was abandoned twice by its residents after the mine veins faulted. The land where the town is located was purchased by a private investor and is now a tourist attraction. Goldfield's Superstition Narrow Gauge Railroad is the only 3 ft (914 mm) narrow-gauge railroad in operation in Arizona. Other attractions include re-enactments of gunfights on the Main Street of the town.

== Brief history ==
Collin Hakes, Riley Morse, and Orlando and Orin Merrill were the first to discover gold in the Goldfield area of the Superstition Mountains. Soon thereafter, prospectors came to the area in search of gold. In 1893, the mining town, which became known as Goldfield, was founded next to the Superstition Mountain in what was then the Arizona Territory. The town, in its heyday, reached a population of about 4000 residents. It had a hotel, general store, post office, church and school. The Goldfield Post Office was established on October 7, 1893. When the mine vein faulted in 1897, the grade of ore dropped leaving the miners without a job. The town began to suffer since its economy depended heavily on the earnings of the miners, who moved out. It was not long before the rest of the towns residents relocated, as well, to other areas rendering Goldfield a ghost town. The Goldfield Post Office was discontinued on November 2, 1898.

In 1910, several mines were opened nearby with the installation of a mill and cyanide plant. A small community called Youngberg evolved around the ghost town. The town was named after George U. Young, secretary of Arizona and acting governor at the time, who was also the promoter and general manager for the Derby Mining Company from 1900 to 1908. Young was interested in promoting the development of the mining industry of the area. He became vice president and general manager of the Madizelle Mining Company in Prescott, Arizona and Young Mines Company, Ltd. in Goldfield. However, after years of investments from investors on the east coast, the mines faulted again and by around 1918, Young had suffered an accident at Youngberg. The accident ultimately led to Young's sudden death at his home at 'Derby Mines' on Thanksgiving Day in 1926, after which the town of Youngberg and the Madizelle in Yavapai County were once again deserted.

Robert F. "Bob” Schoose was born in River Grove, Illinois and moved to California with his family at a young age. He heard of the old site of Goldfield and moved to the town Mesa, Arizona. In 1984, Schoose and his wife Lou Ann, purchased the Goldfield Mill property and decided to rebuild and restore the buildings of the old town with the help of various friends—whose names are inscribed in a plaque on the tower that leads to the town. Schoose incorporated the town as the "GOLDFIELD, GHOST TOWN AND MINE TOURS, INC." He serves as president, his wife as Secretary/Treasurer, and Jay Zingler as vice-president.

The town and its historic buildings were revived as a tourist attraction. The town has the only 3 ft (914 mm) narrow gauge railroad in operation in Arizona. It also has numerous shops and buildings, including a brothel, bakery, leather works, a jail, livery, and others. Also, pictured is an 1890 Porter 0-4-0 narrow gauge steam engine which once was used in the gold mines of Goldfield. The Main Street of the town features a reenactment of a western shootout (a photo is also included in the picture gallery). The town is located at 4650 N, Mammoth Mine Road within the jurisdiction of Apache Junction, Arizona.

== Historic structures pictures ==
Among the historic structures and artifacts pictured are the following:

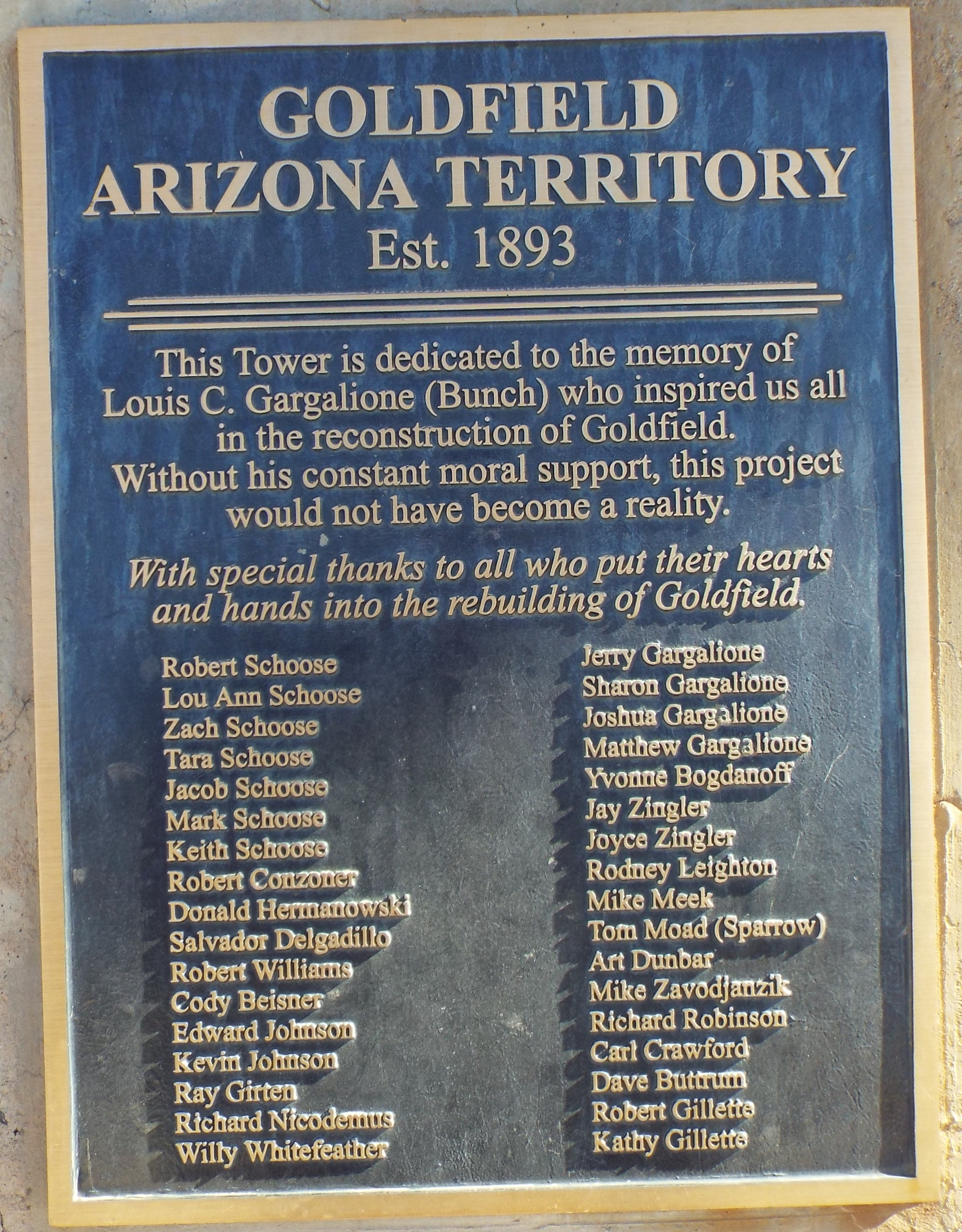
1893 Goldfield Arizona Territory plaque

- The 19th-century "Tower" used in the Goldfield mine.
- The 19th-century Goldfield Railroad Station.
- The only 3 ft (914 mm) narrow-gauge railroad in operation in Arizona.
- A 1890 Porter 0-4-0 once used in the gold mines of Goldfield.
- The Bordello (Brothel).
- The Barn/Stable.
- The abandoned Spanish style house.
- The Livery.
- The Goldfield Museum.
- The Post Office.
- The 19th-century Mercantile building.
- The Mammoth Steak House and Saloon.
- The Goldfield Church at the Mount.
- The Church at the Mount Sunday School, Nursery and Fellowship Hall.
- The Water Tank.
- The Cantina/Bakery.

== Historic structures ==
The following photographs are of some of the historic structures in Goldfield.

Historic Goldfield, Arizona

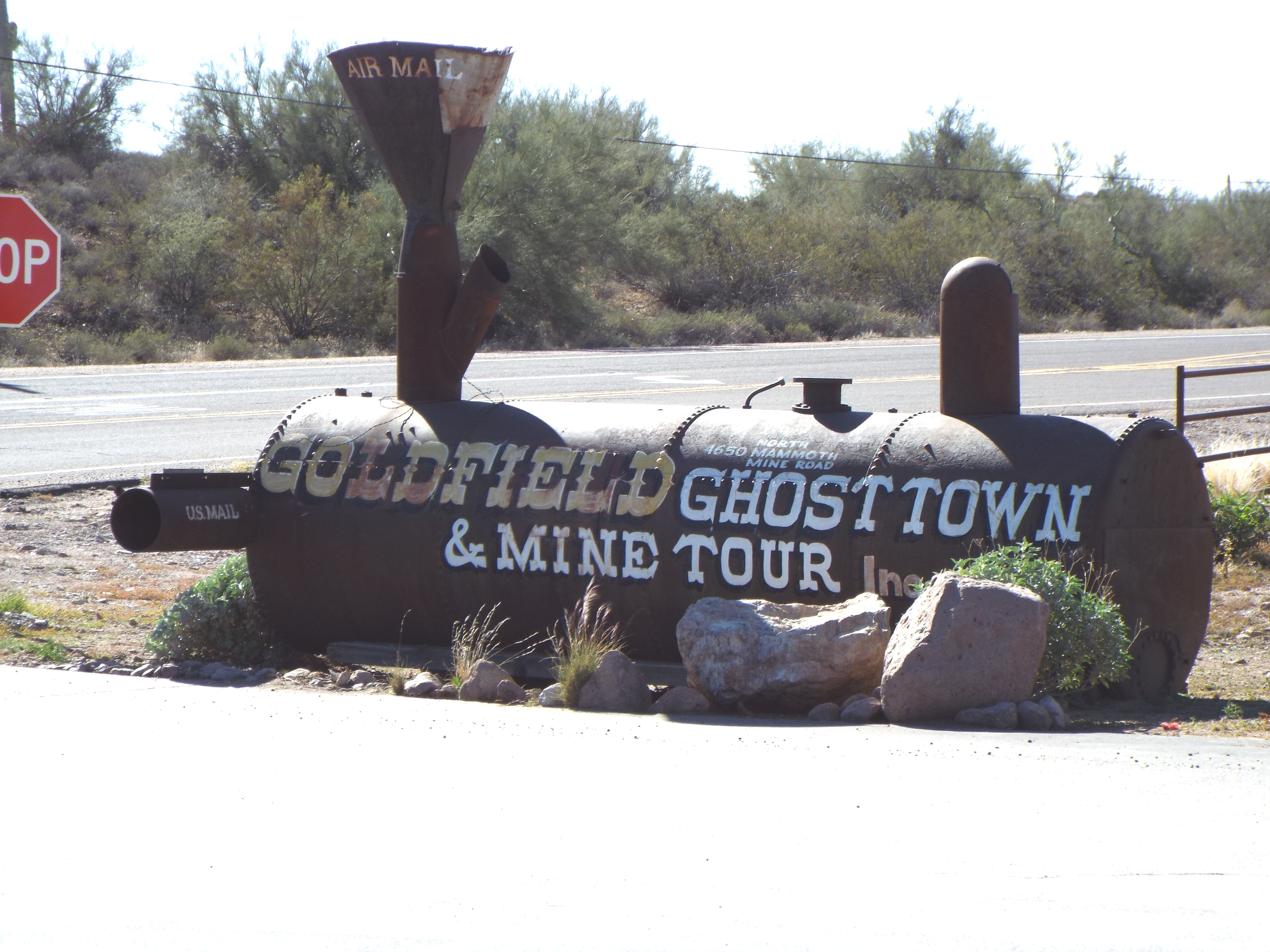
Entrance to the Goldfield Ghost Town.

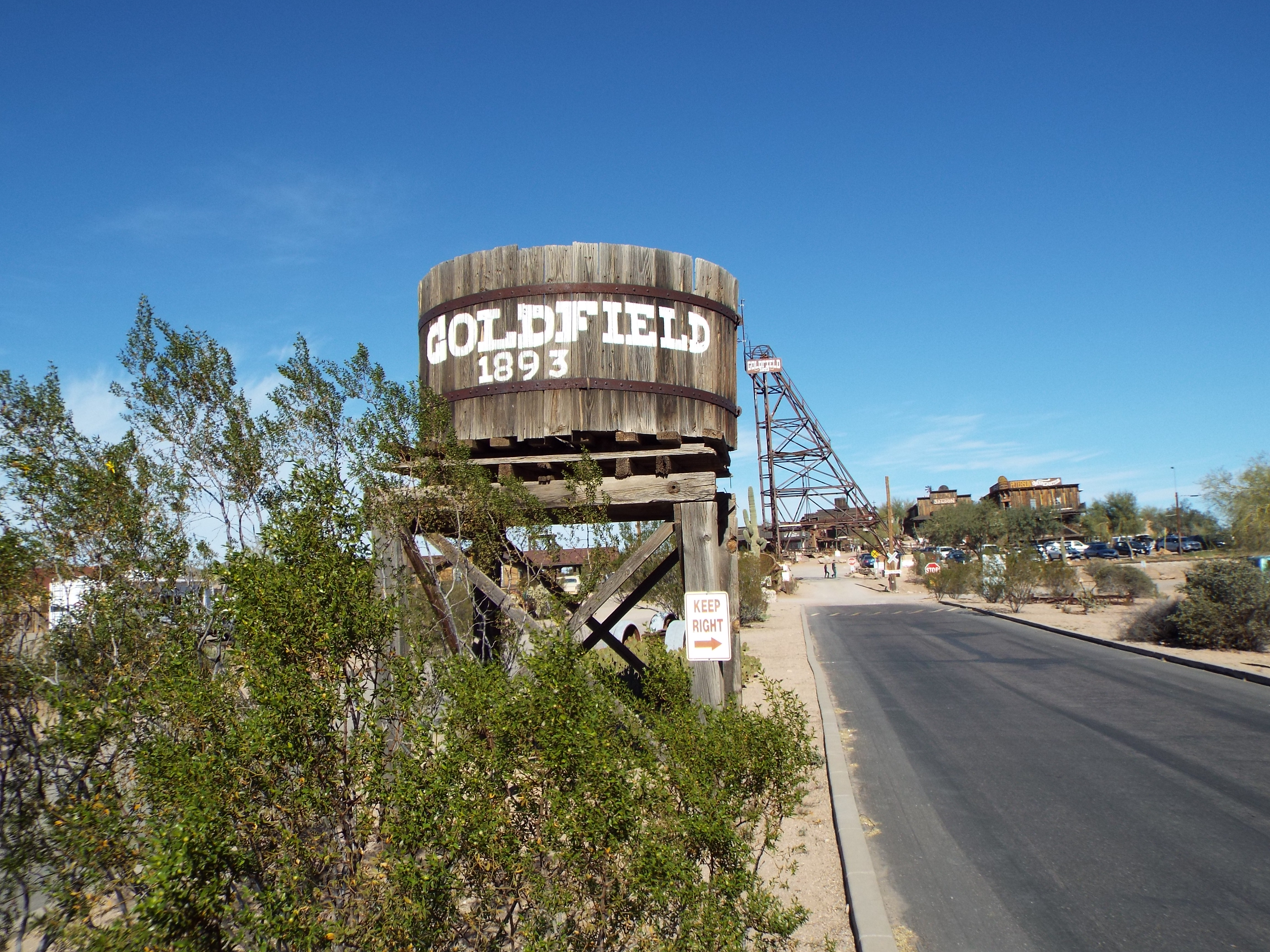
Goldfield Ghost Town

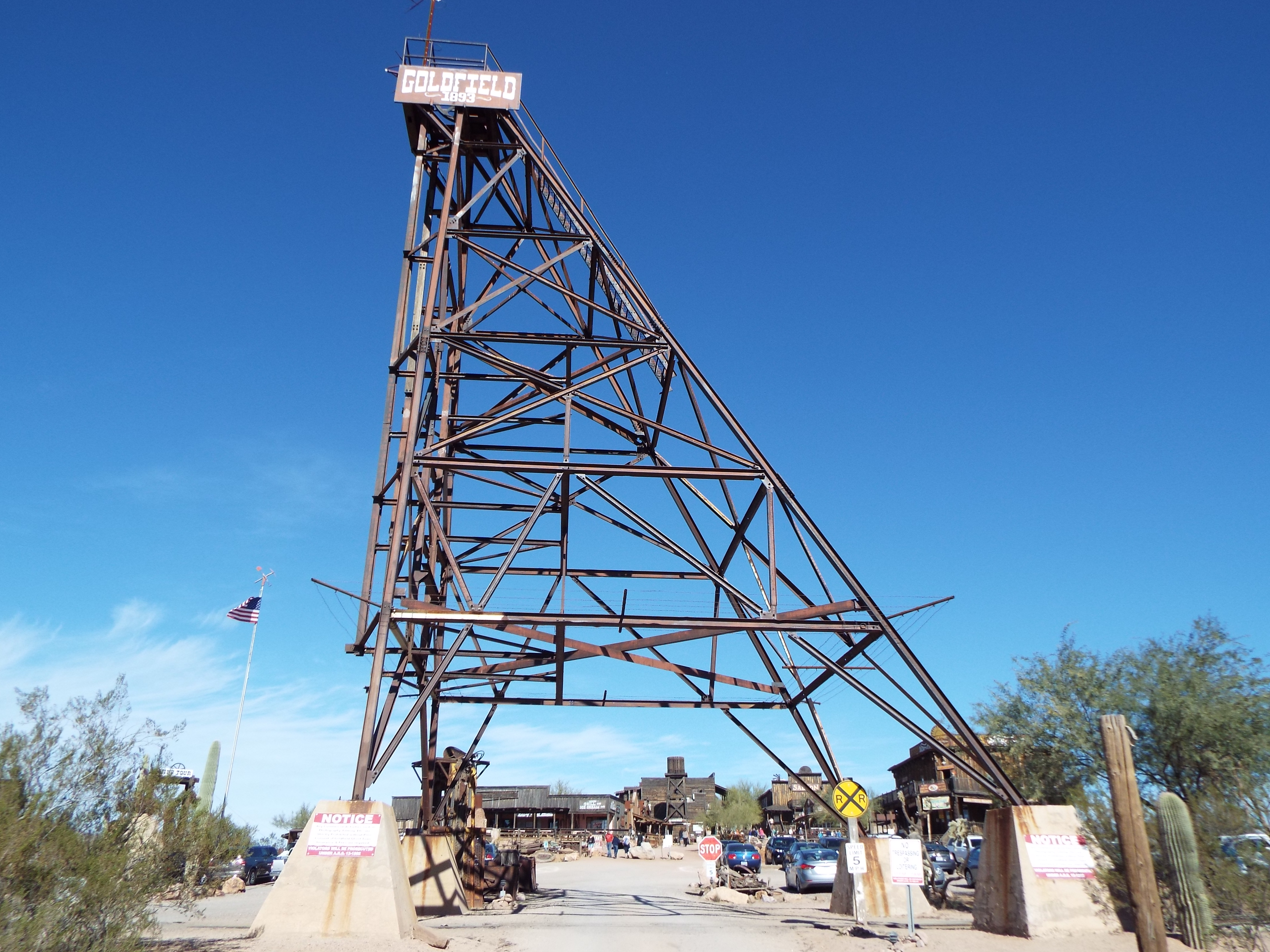
The 19th-century “tower” used in the Goldfield mine

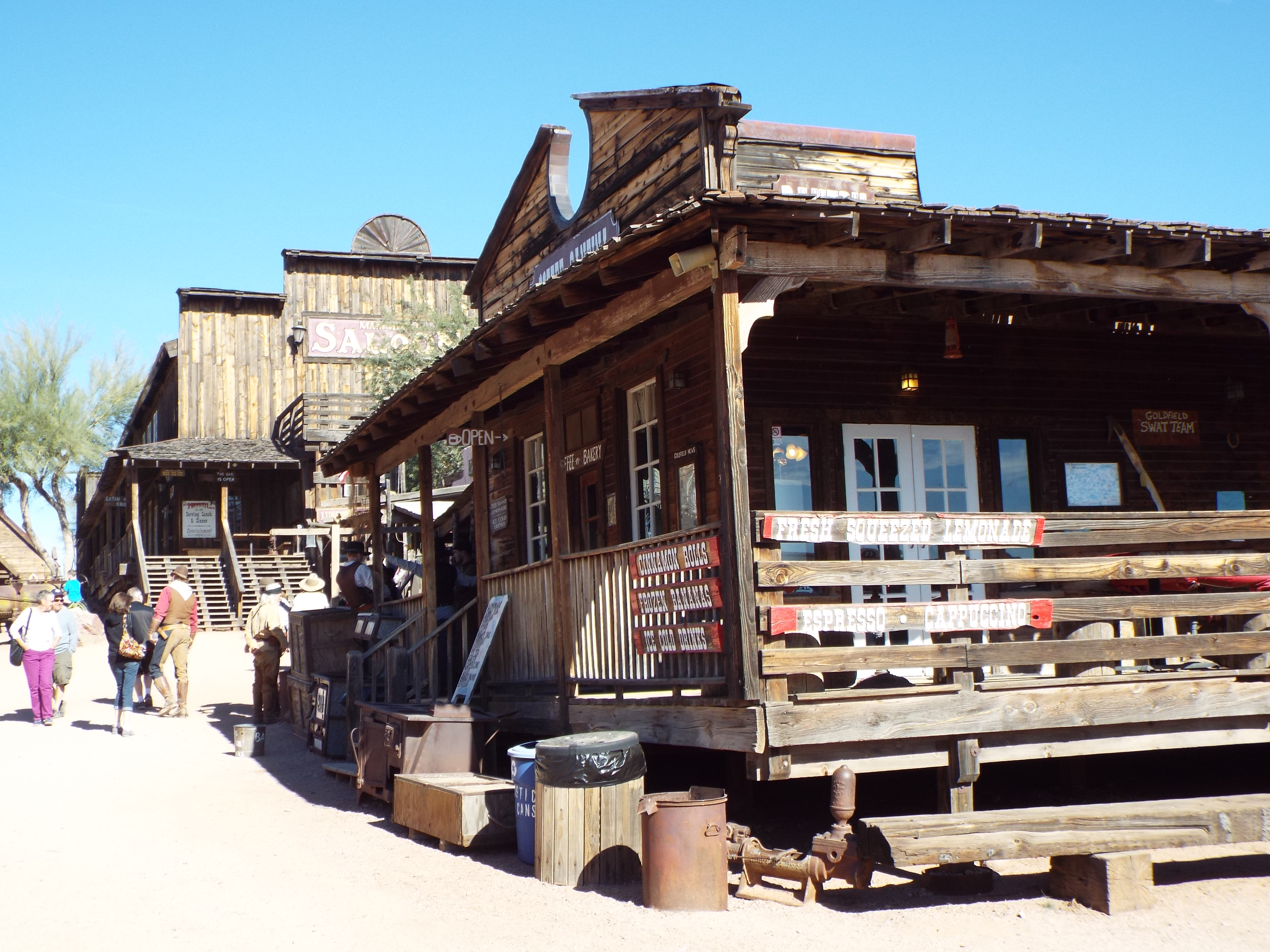
Goldfield’s Main Street

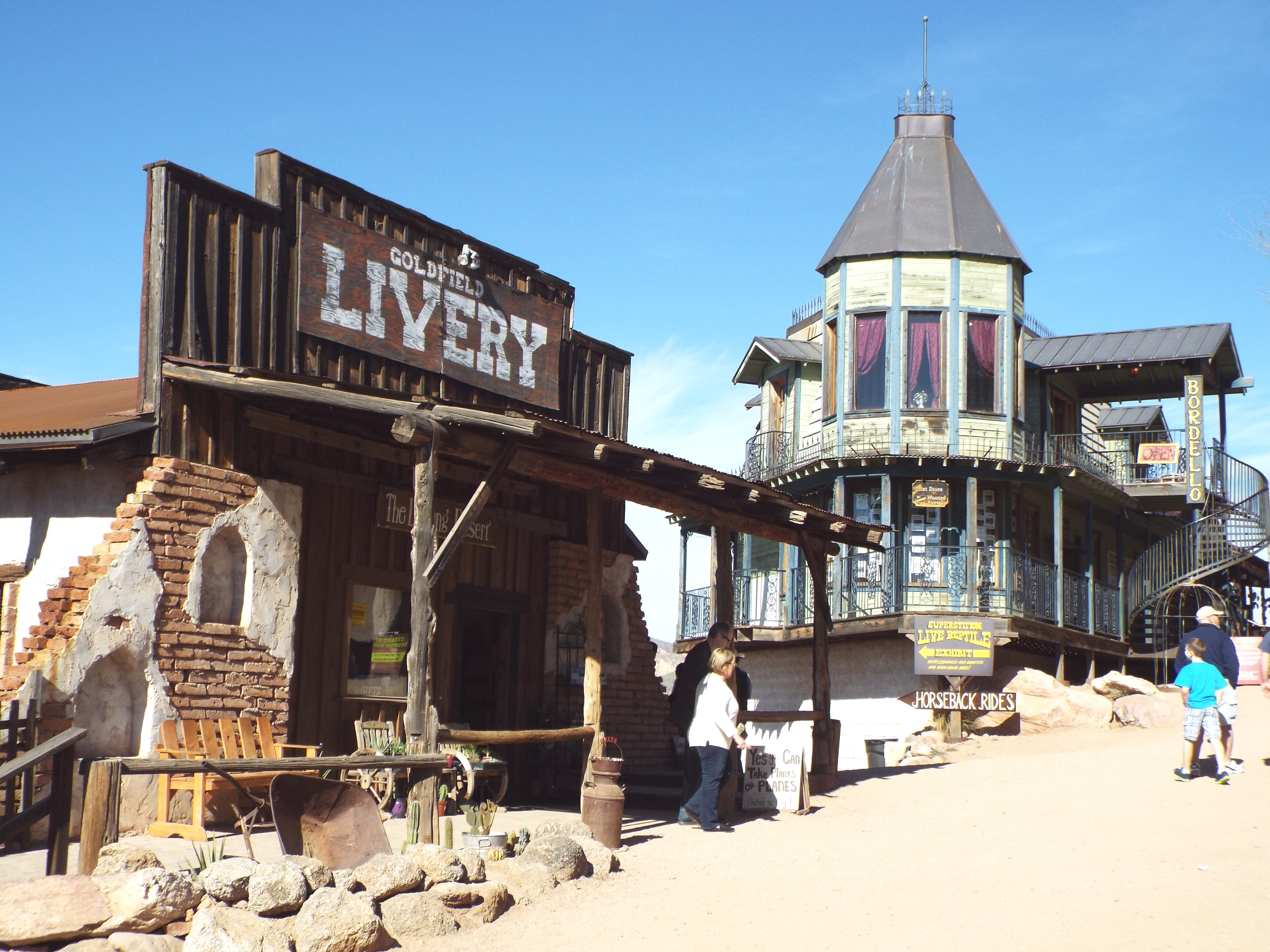
Goldfield’s Main Street

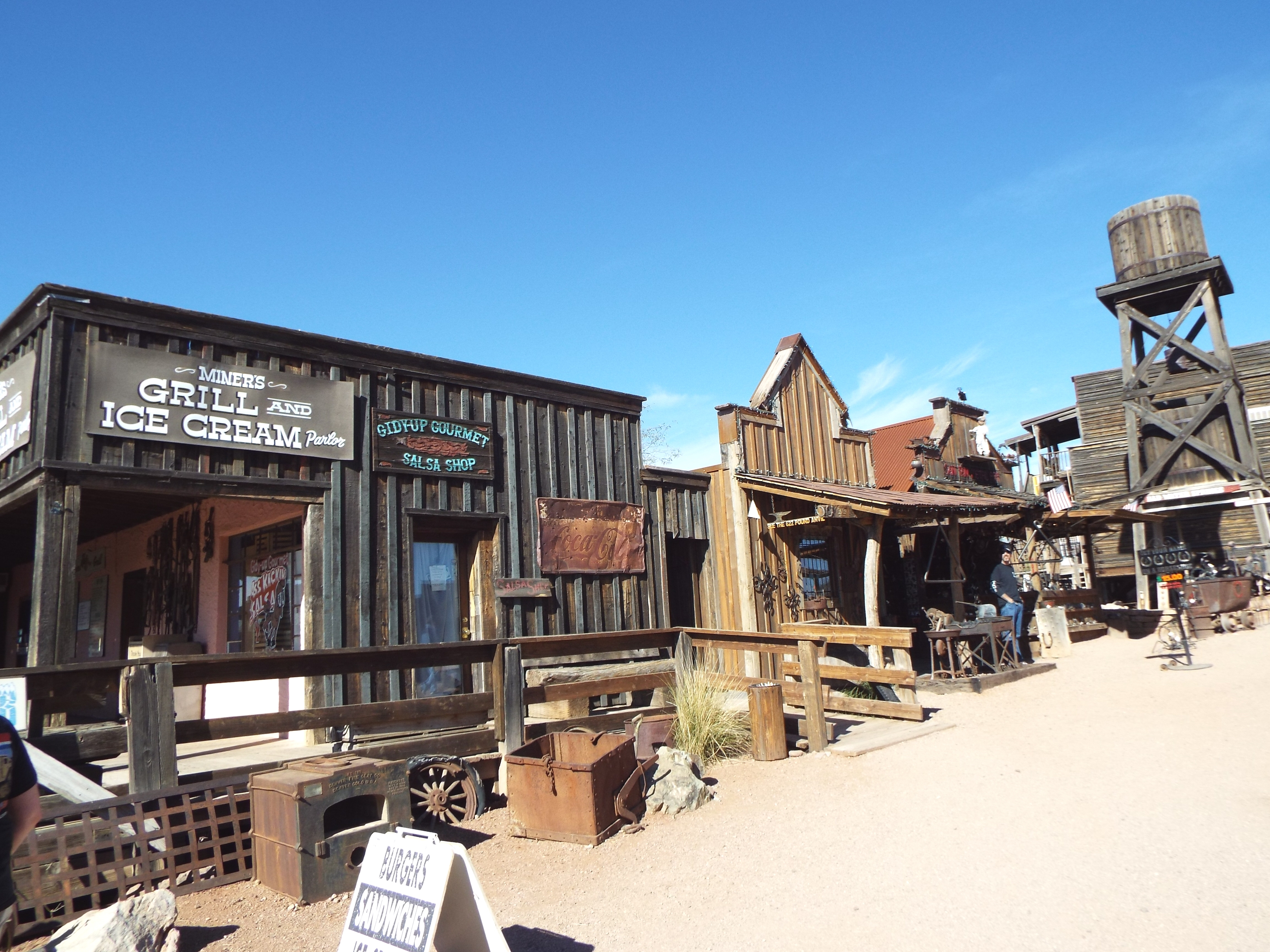
A different view of Goldfield’s Main Street

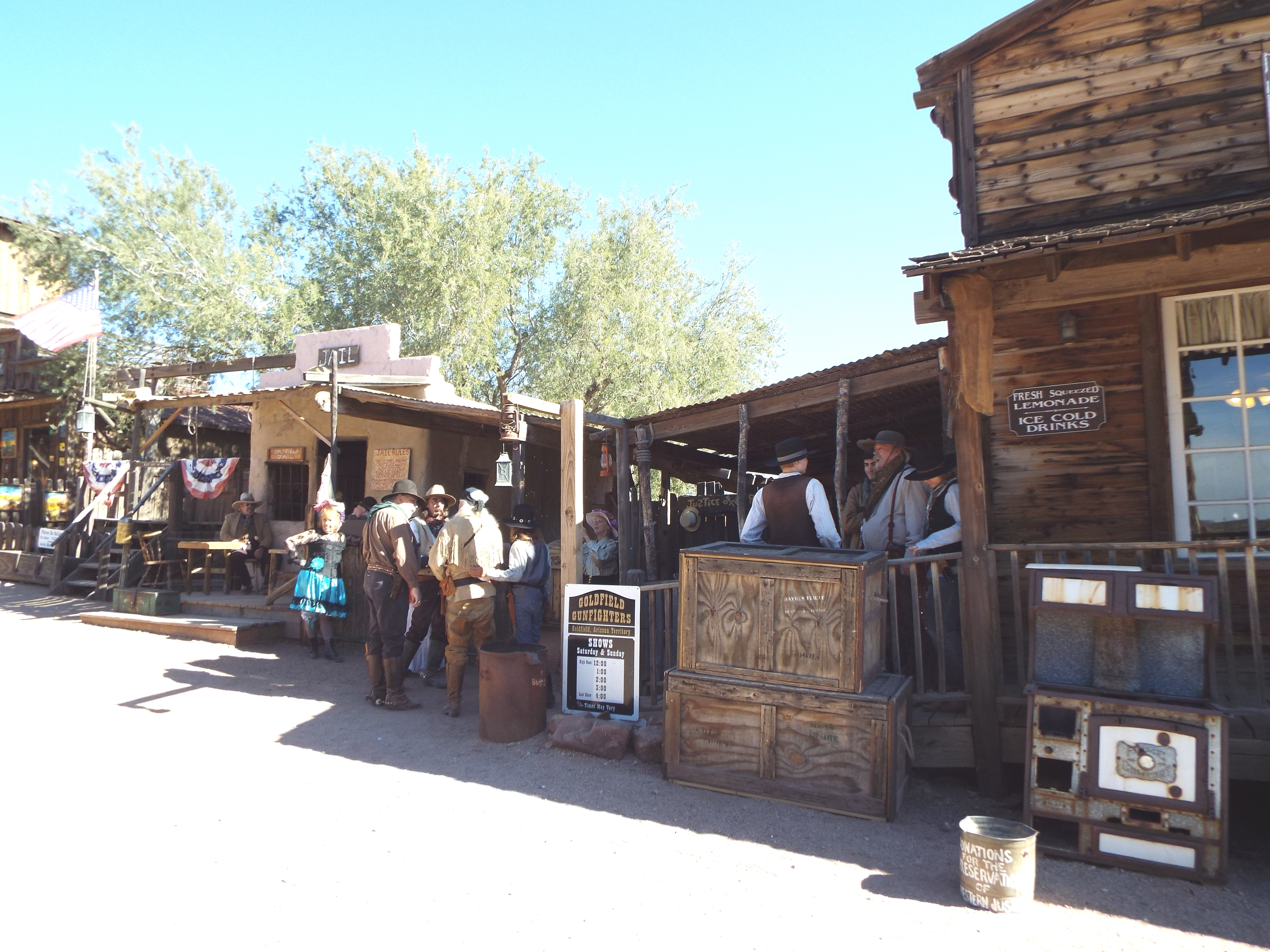
Another view of Goldfield’s Main Street

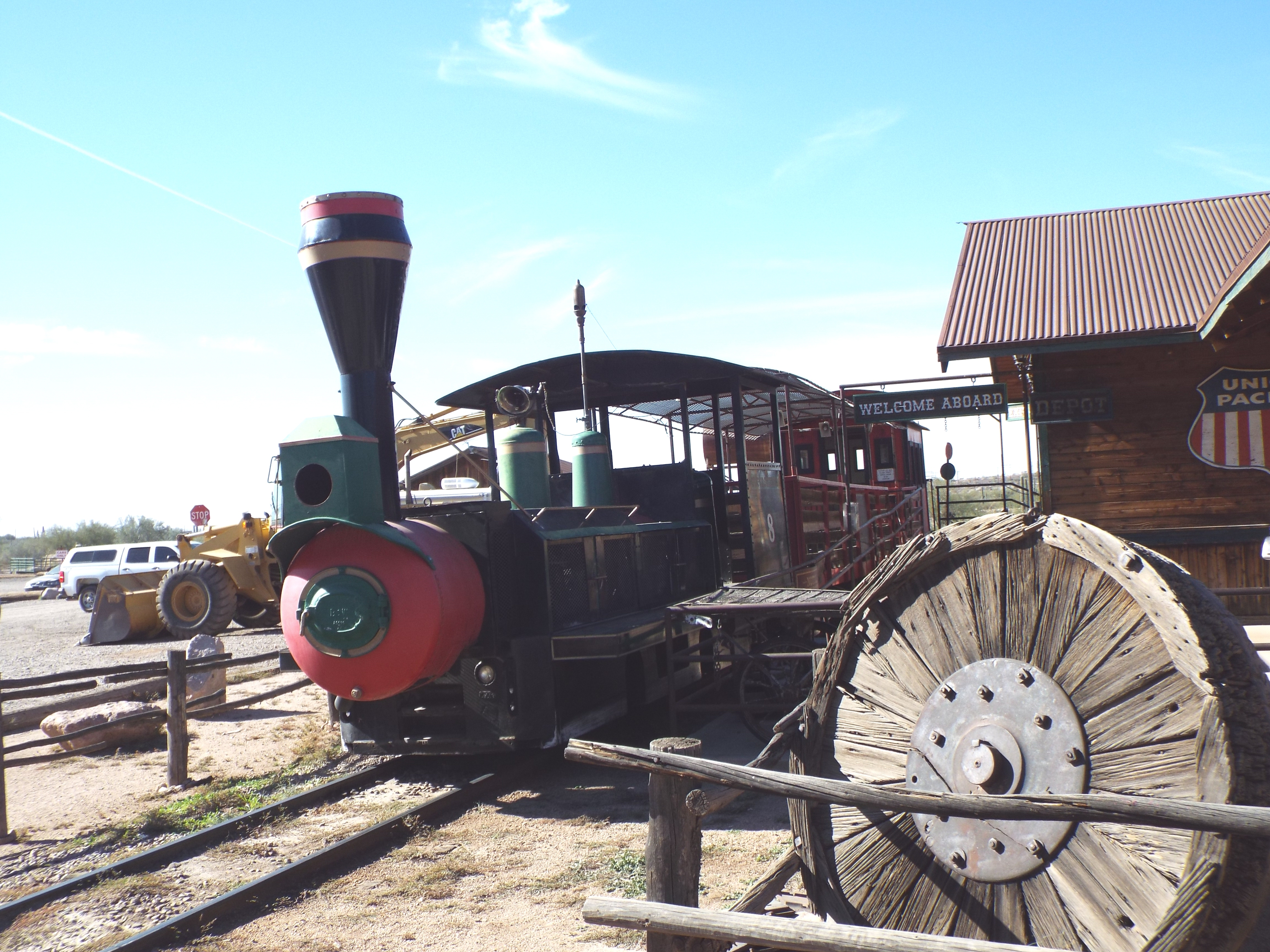
The 19th-century Railroad Station of Goldfield. Goldfield has the only 3 ft (914 mm) narrow-gauge railroad in operation in Arizona.

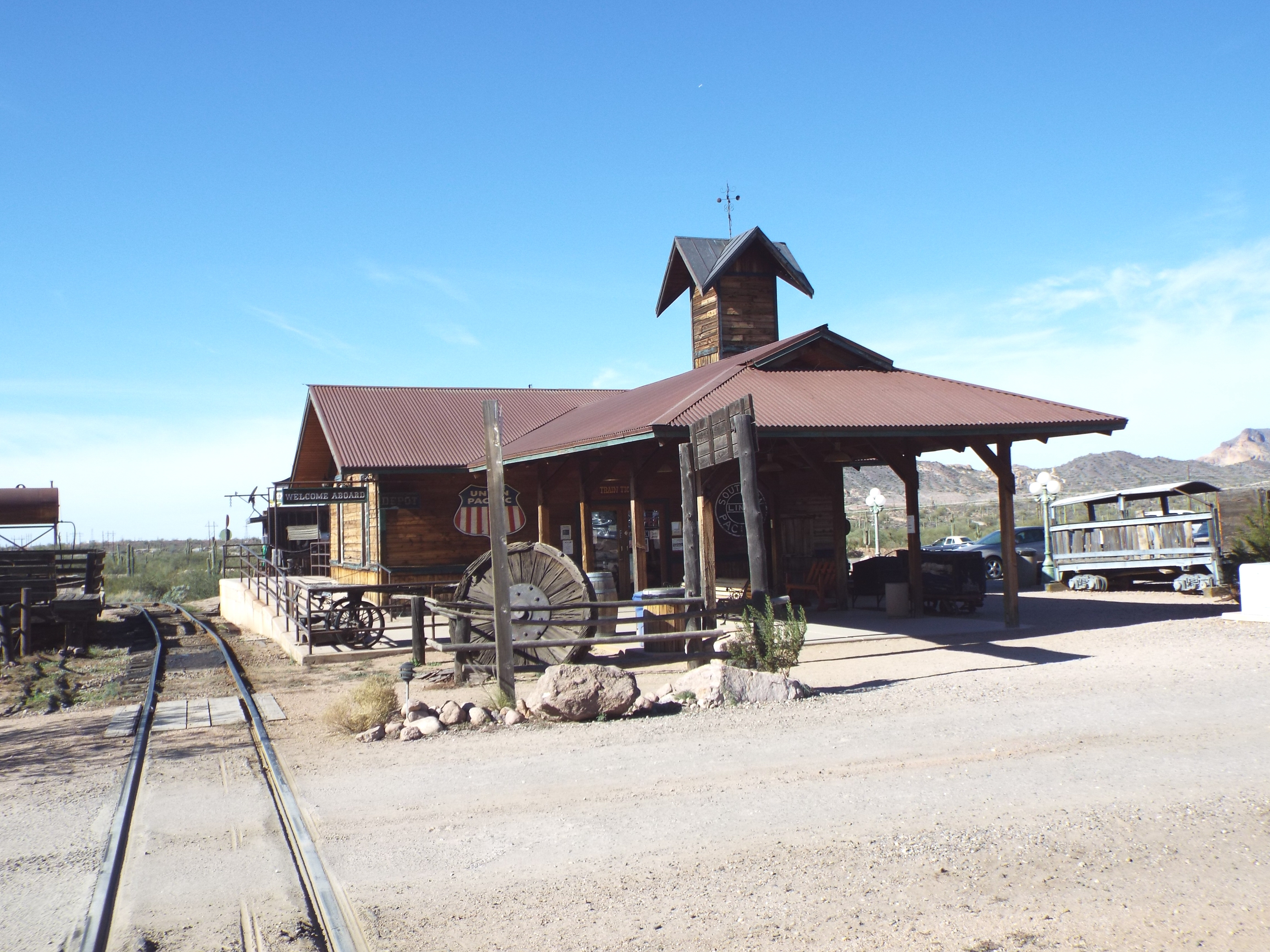
Different view of the 19th-century Goldfield Railroad Station

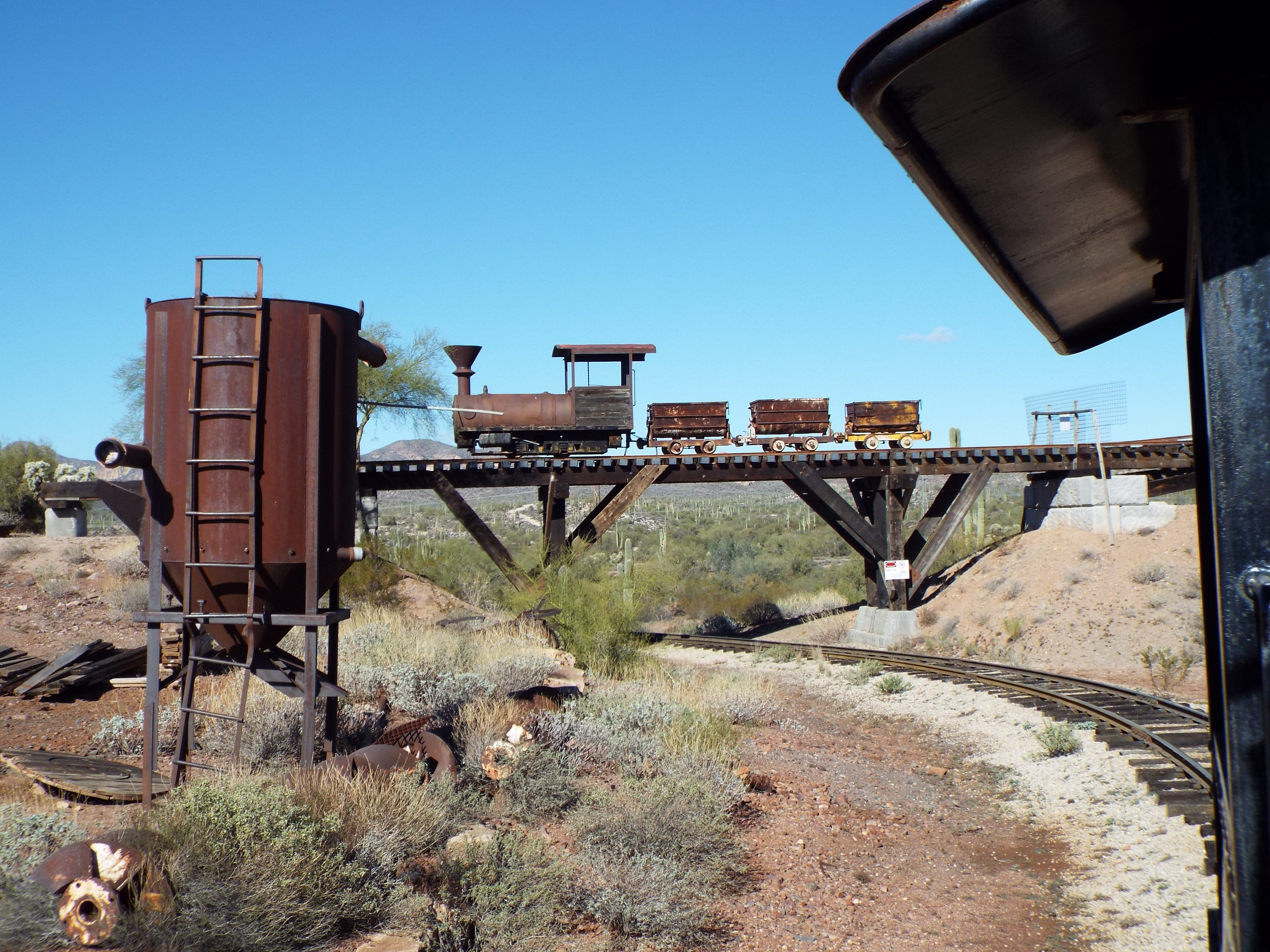
View from the only Narrow gauge railroad train in operation in Arizona

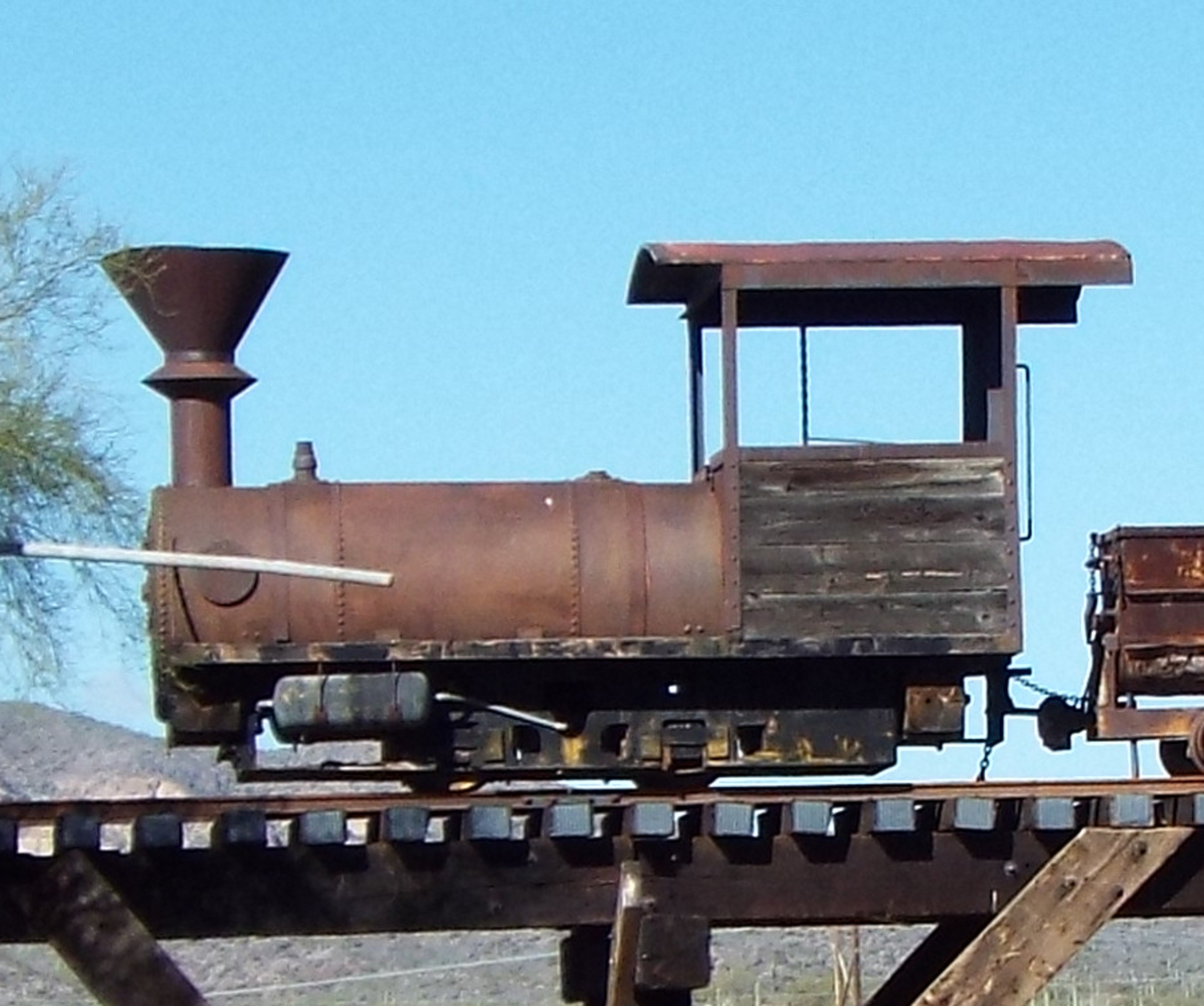
1890 Porter once used in the gold mines of Goldfield

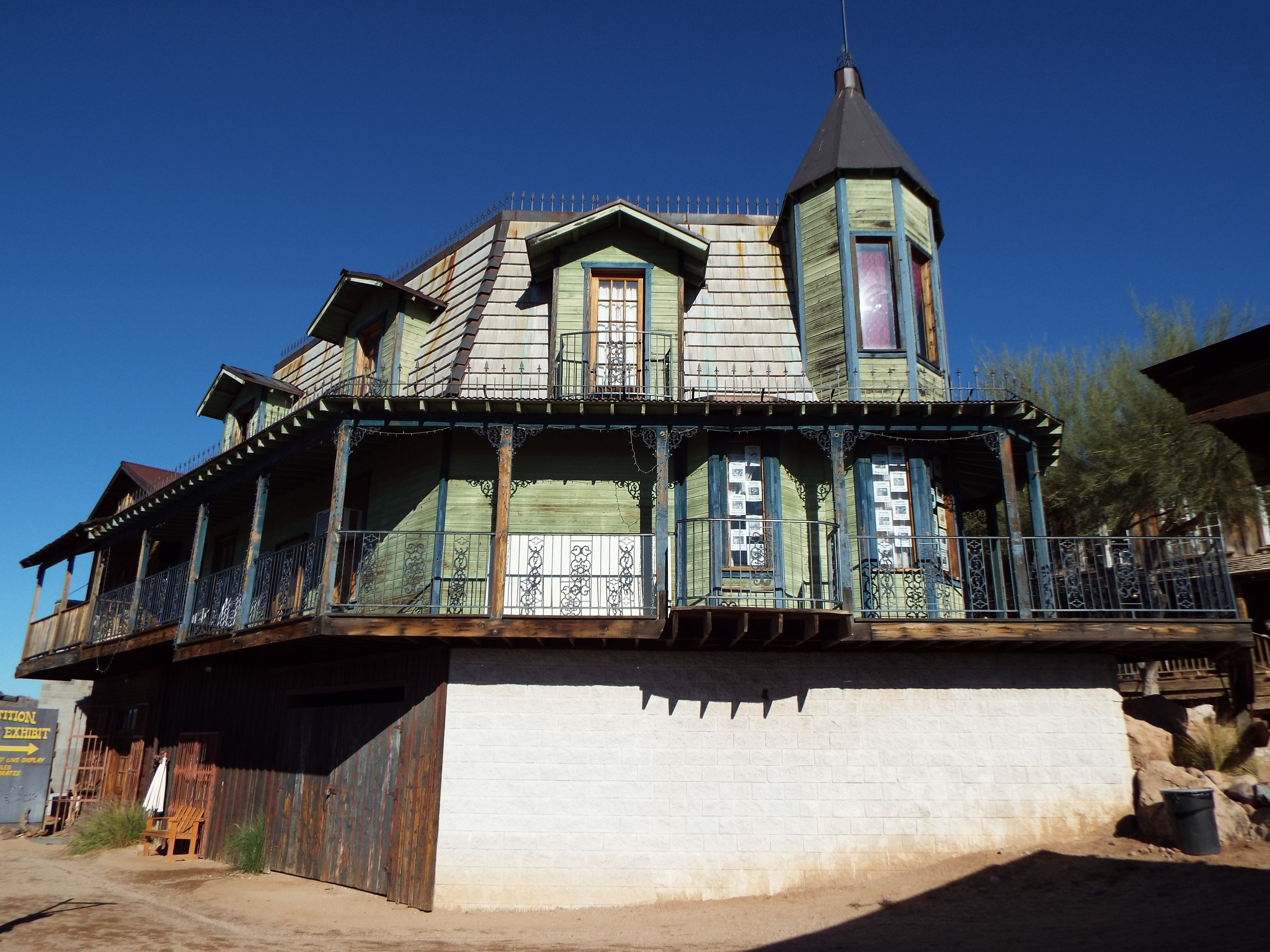
Bordello (Brothel)

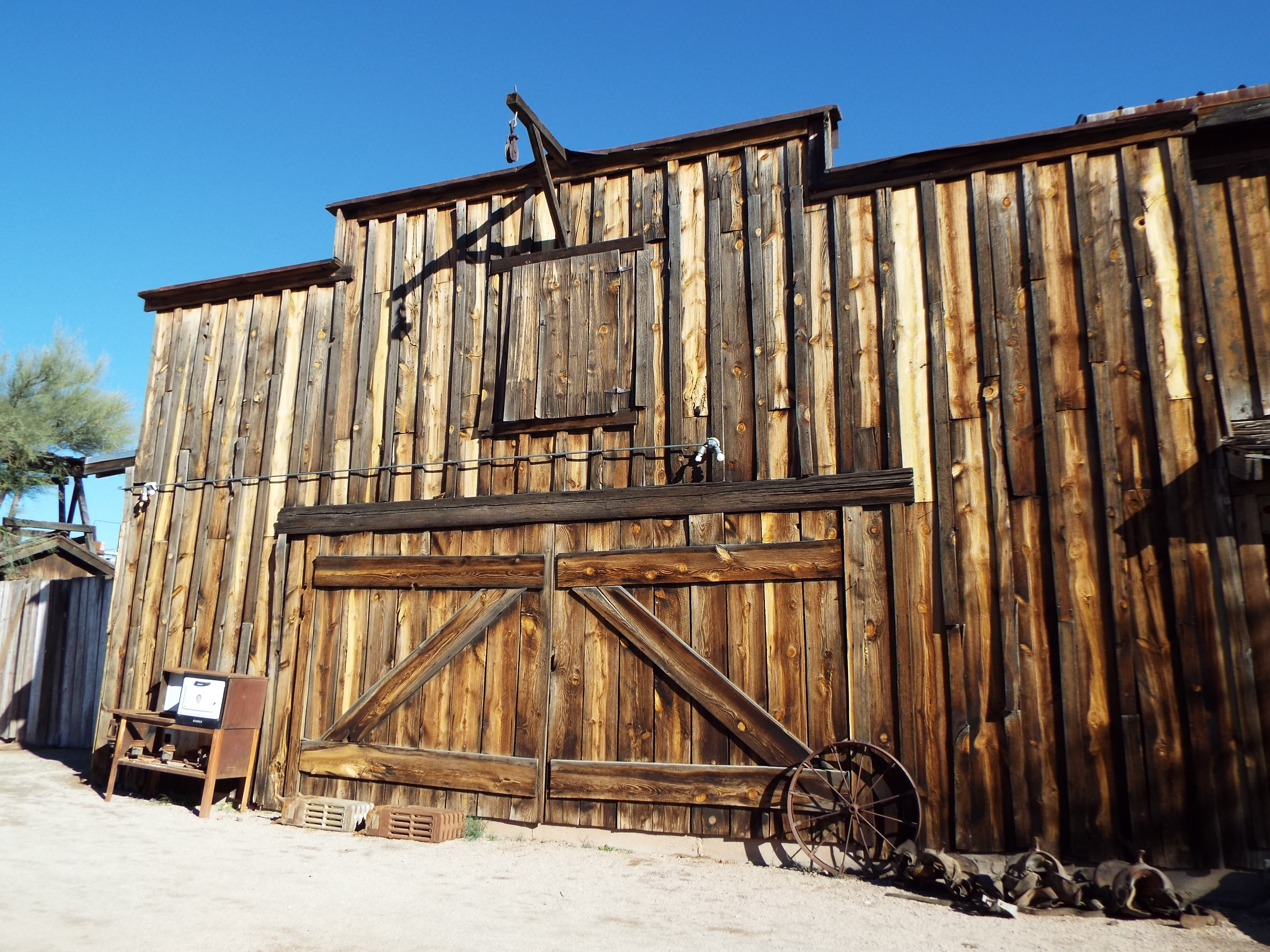
Barn/Stable

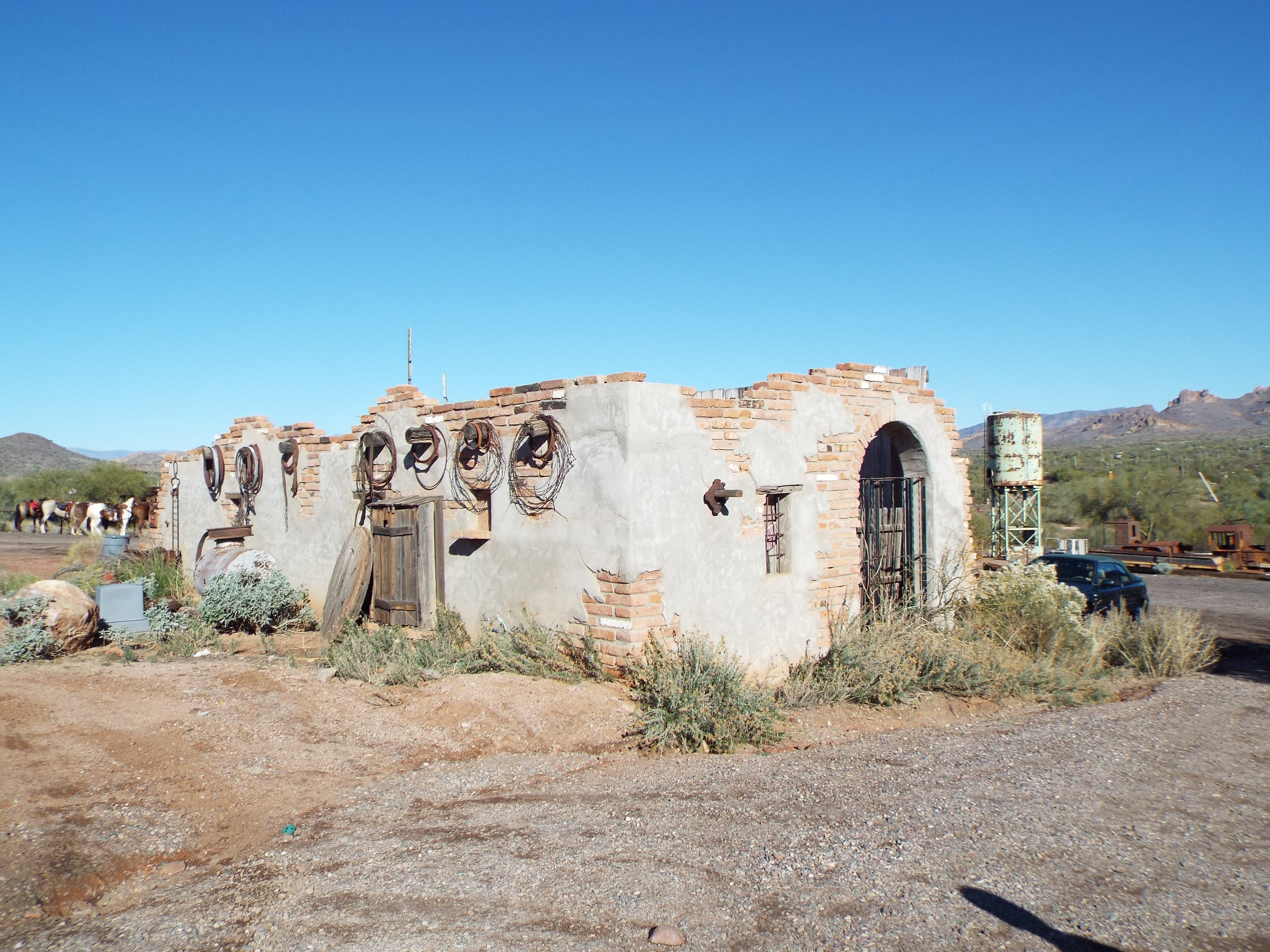
Abandoned Spanish style house

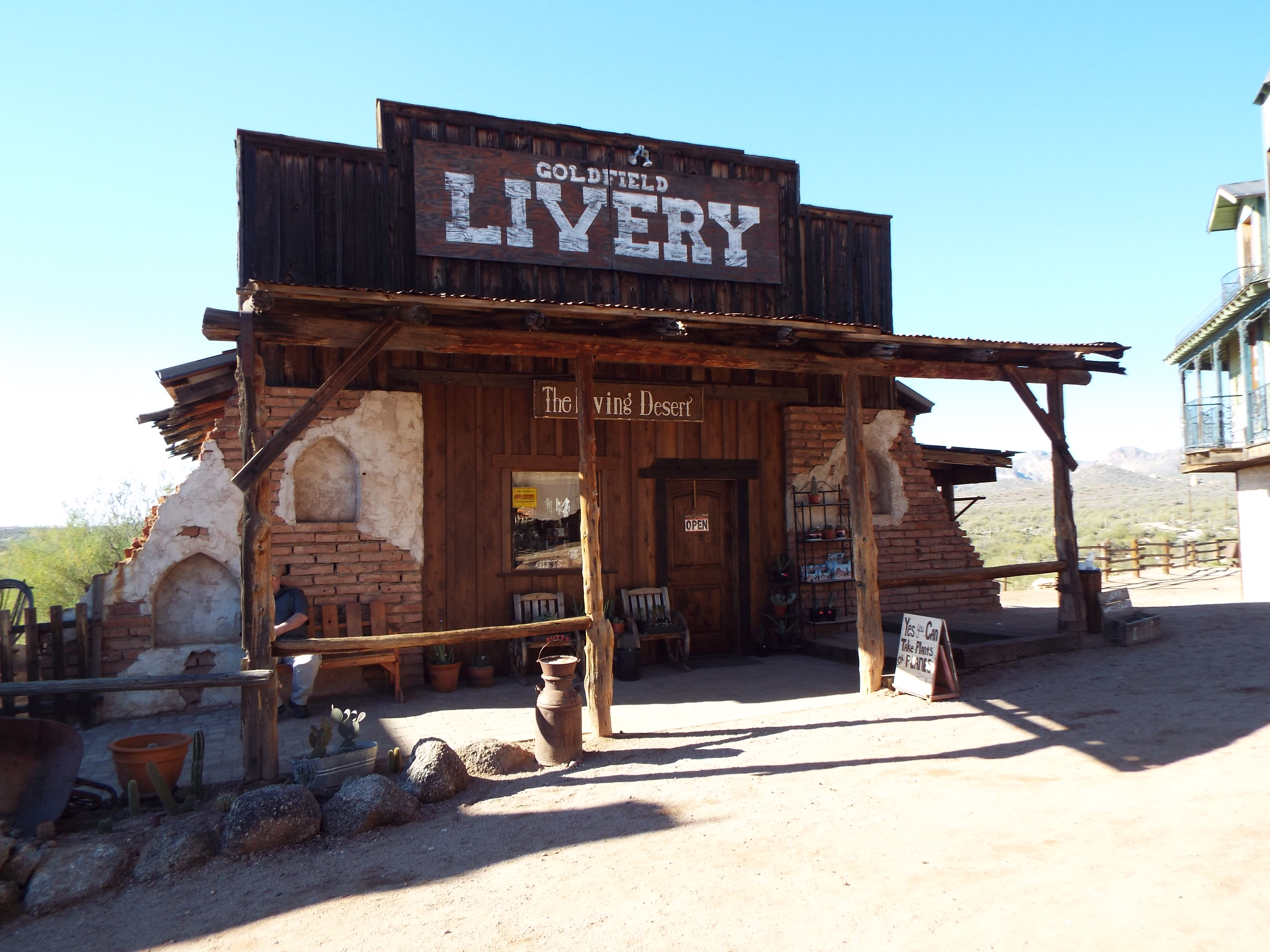
Livery

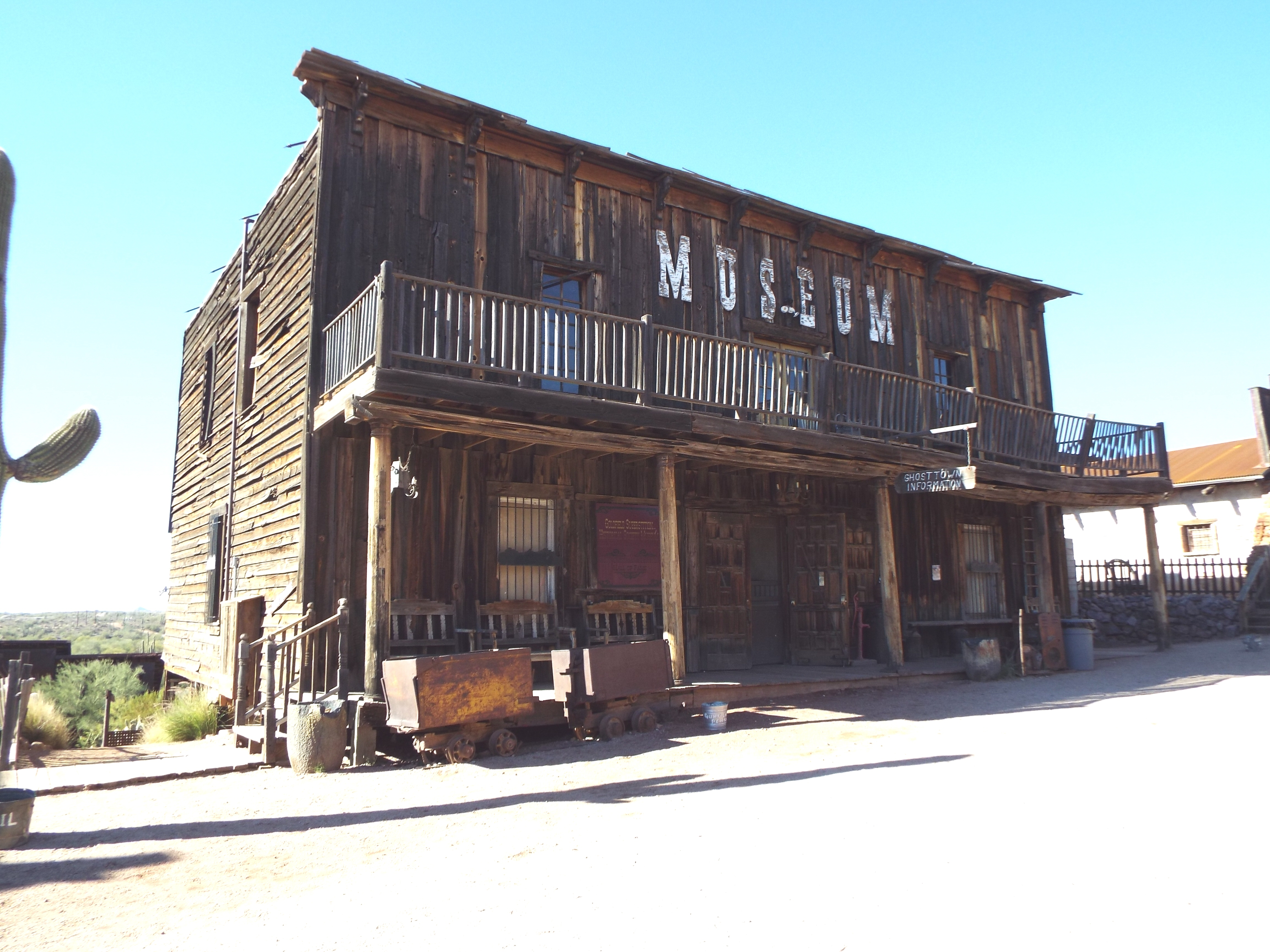
Goldfield Museum

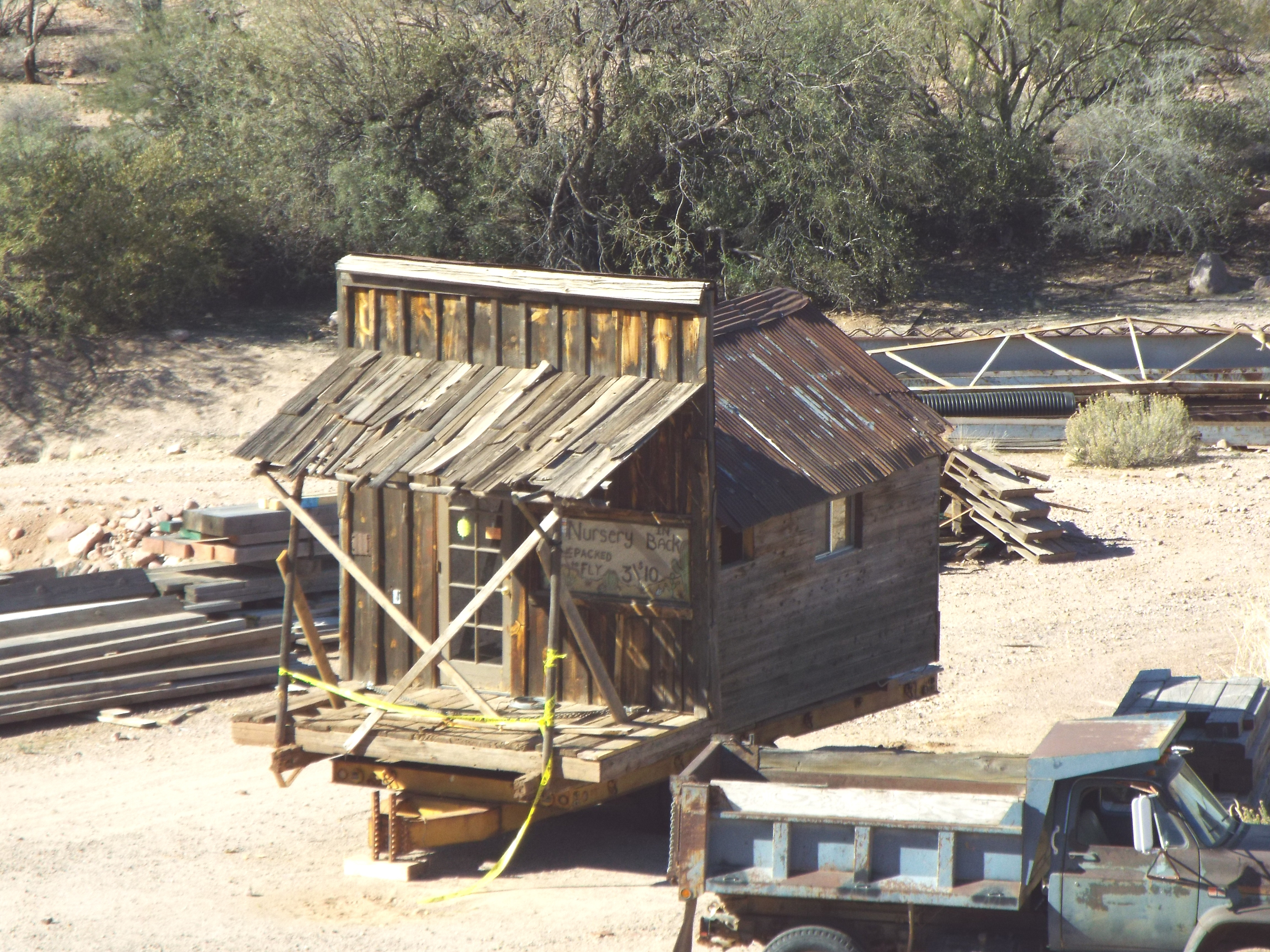
Post Office

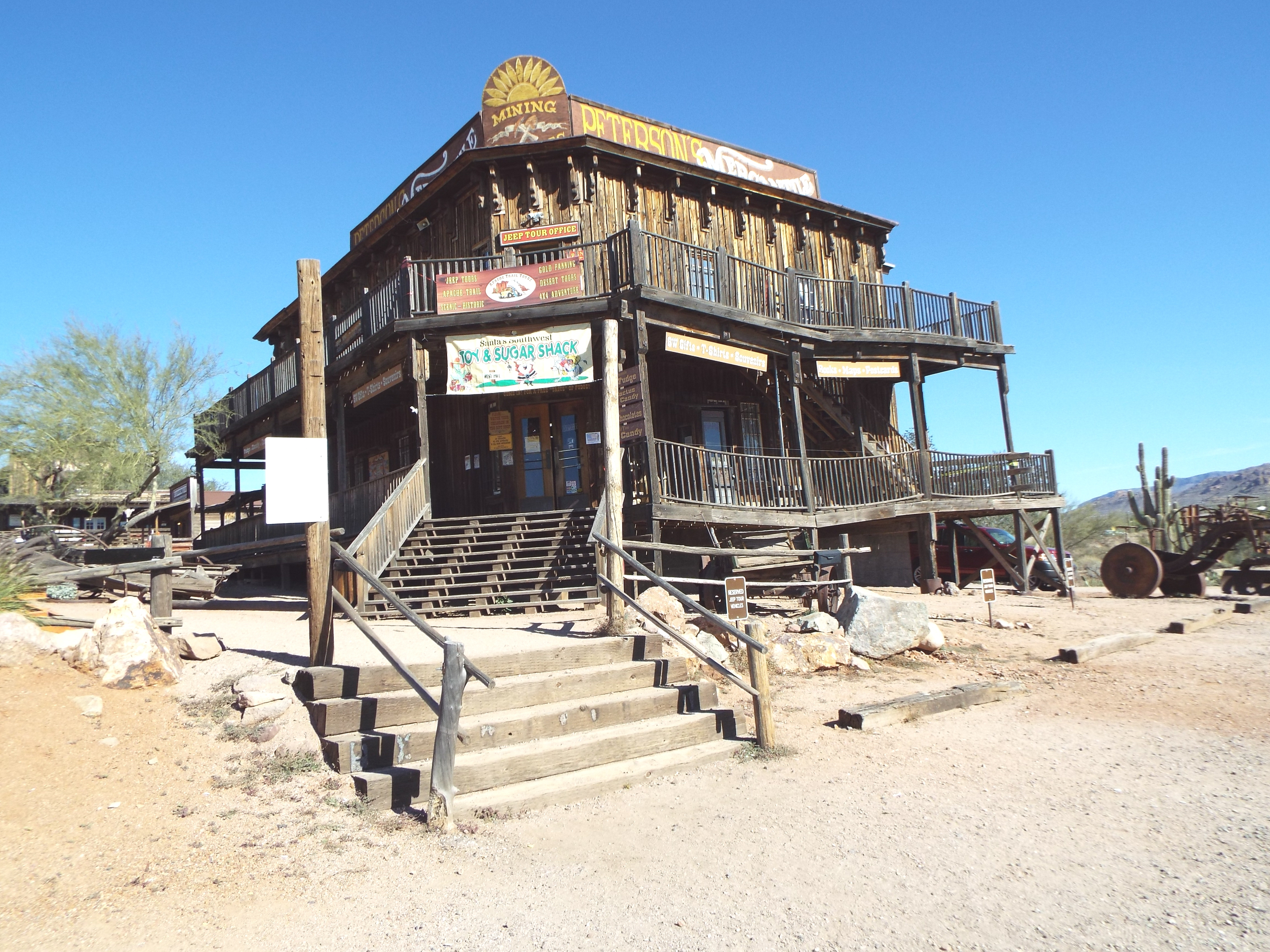
19th-century Mercantile building

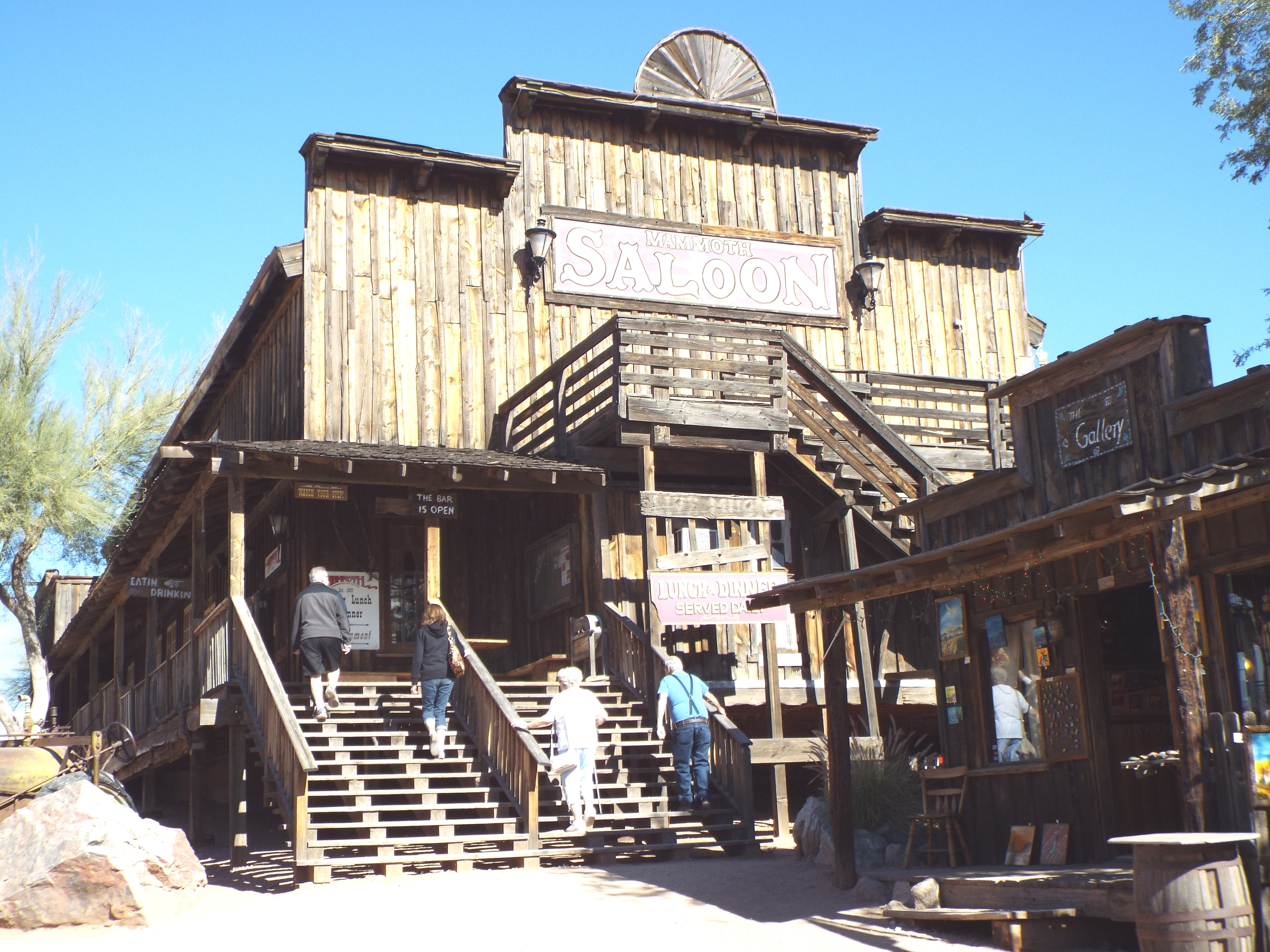
Mammoth Steak House and Saloon

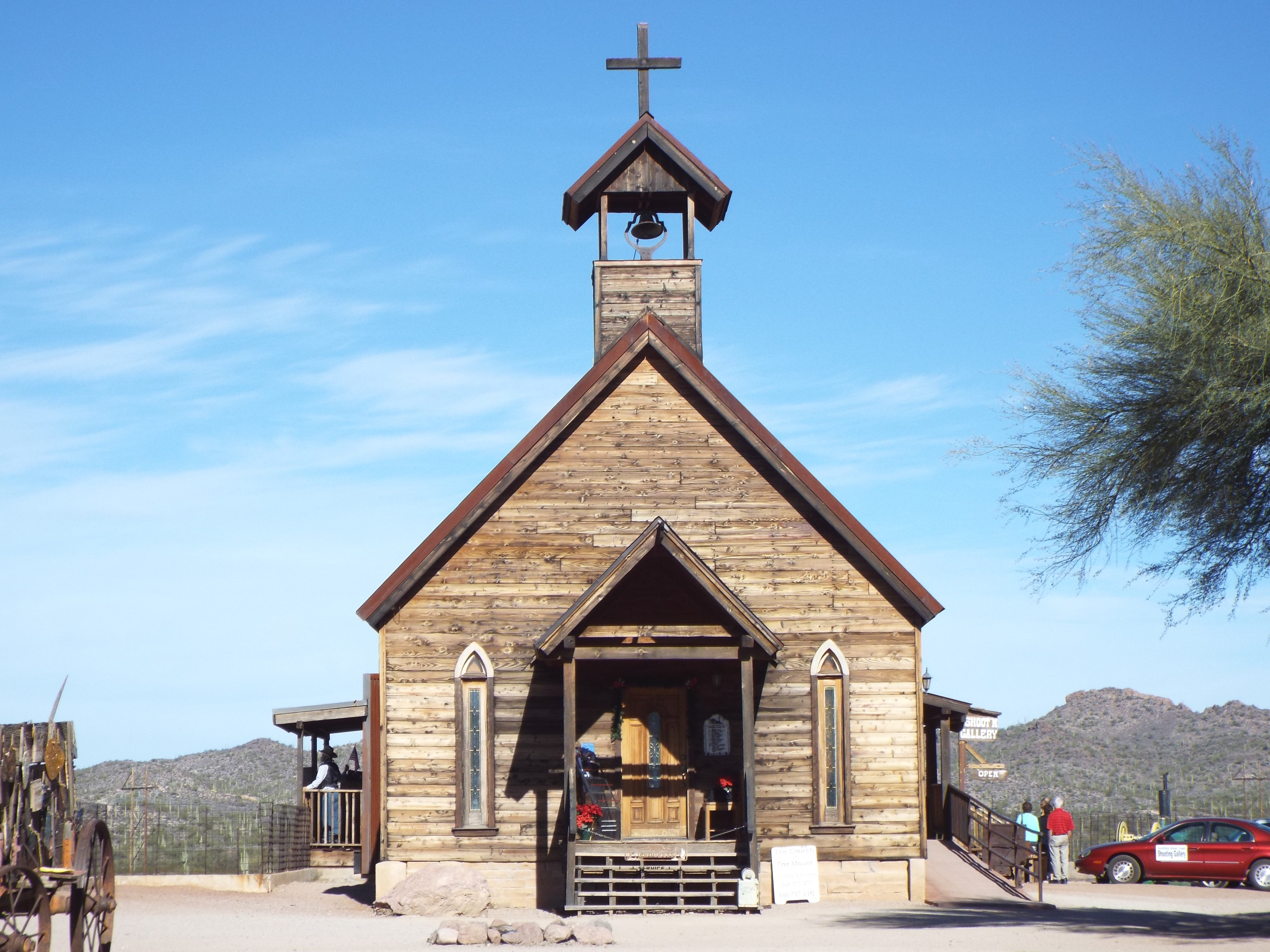
Goldfield Church at the Mount

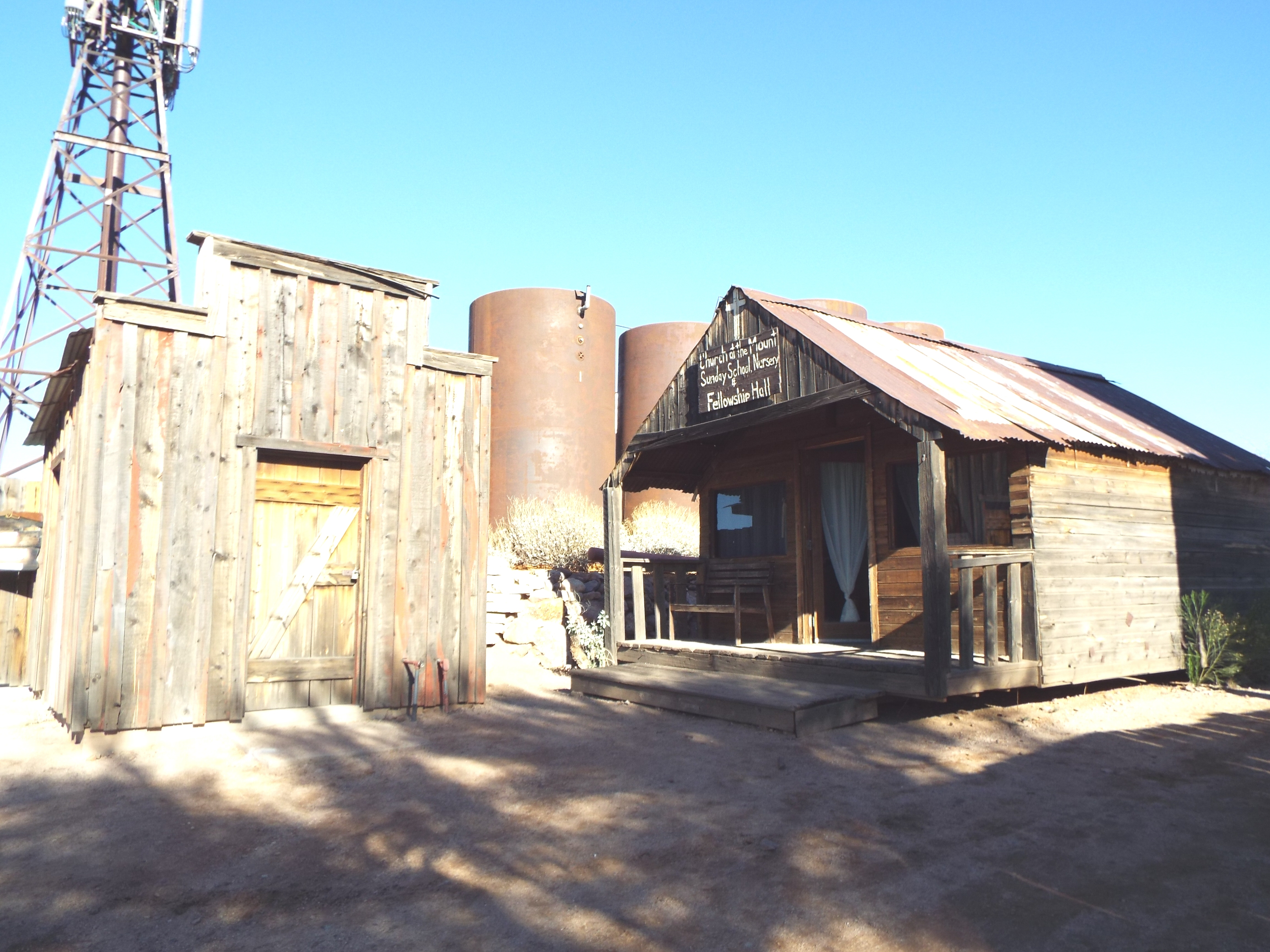
Church at the Mount Sunday School, Nursery and Fellowship Hall

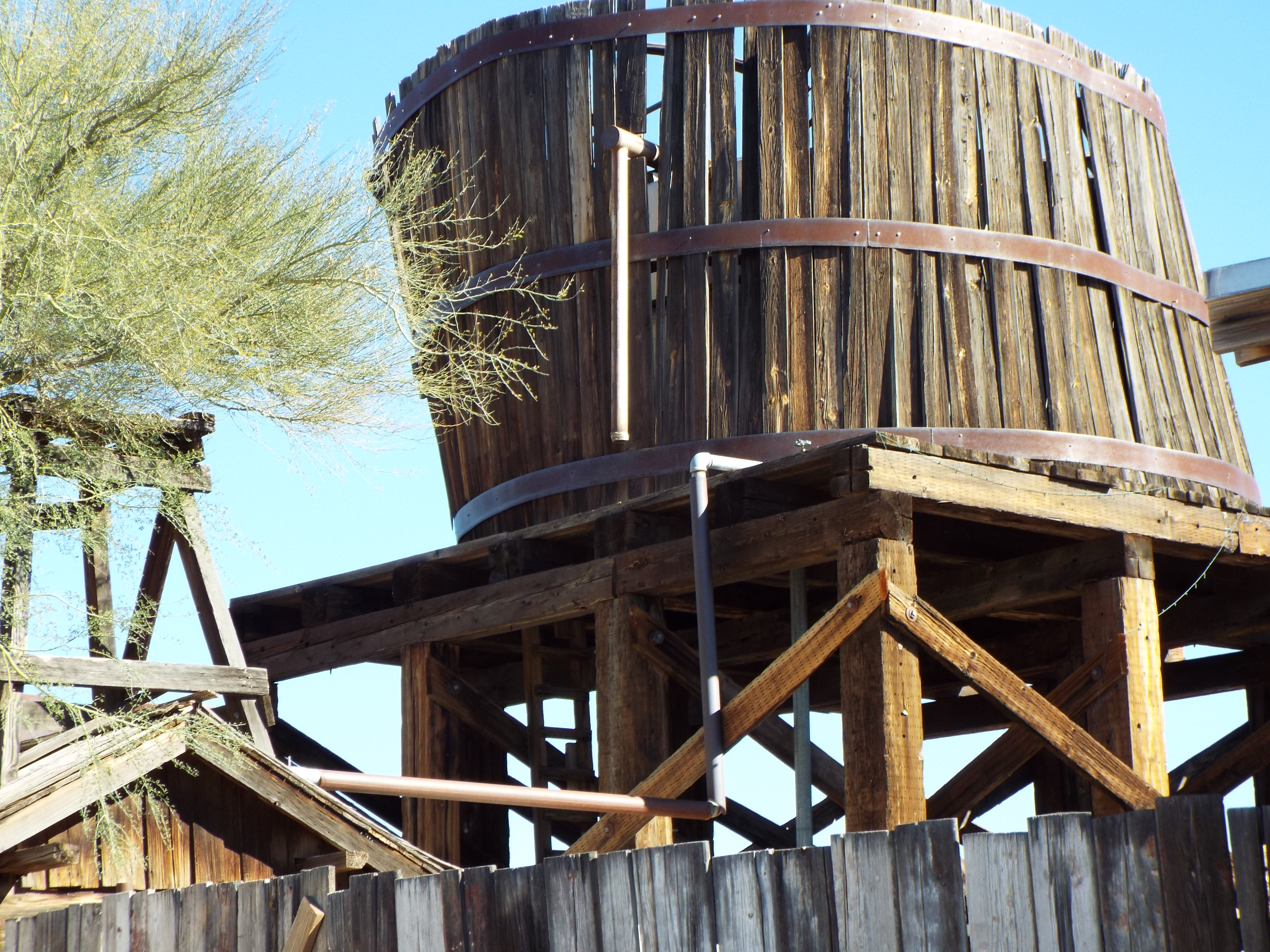
Water Tank

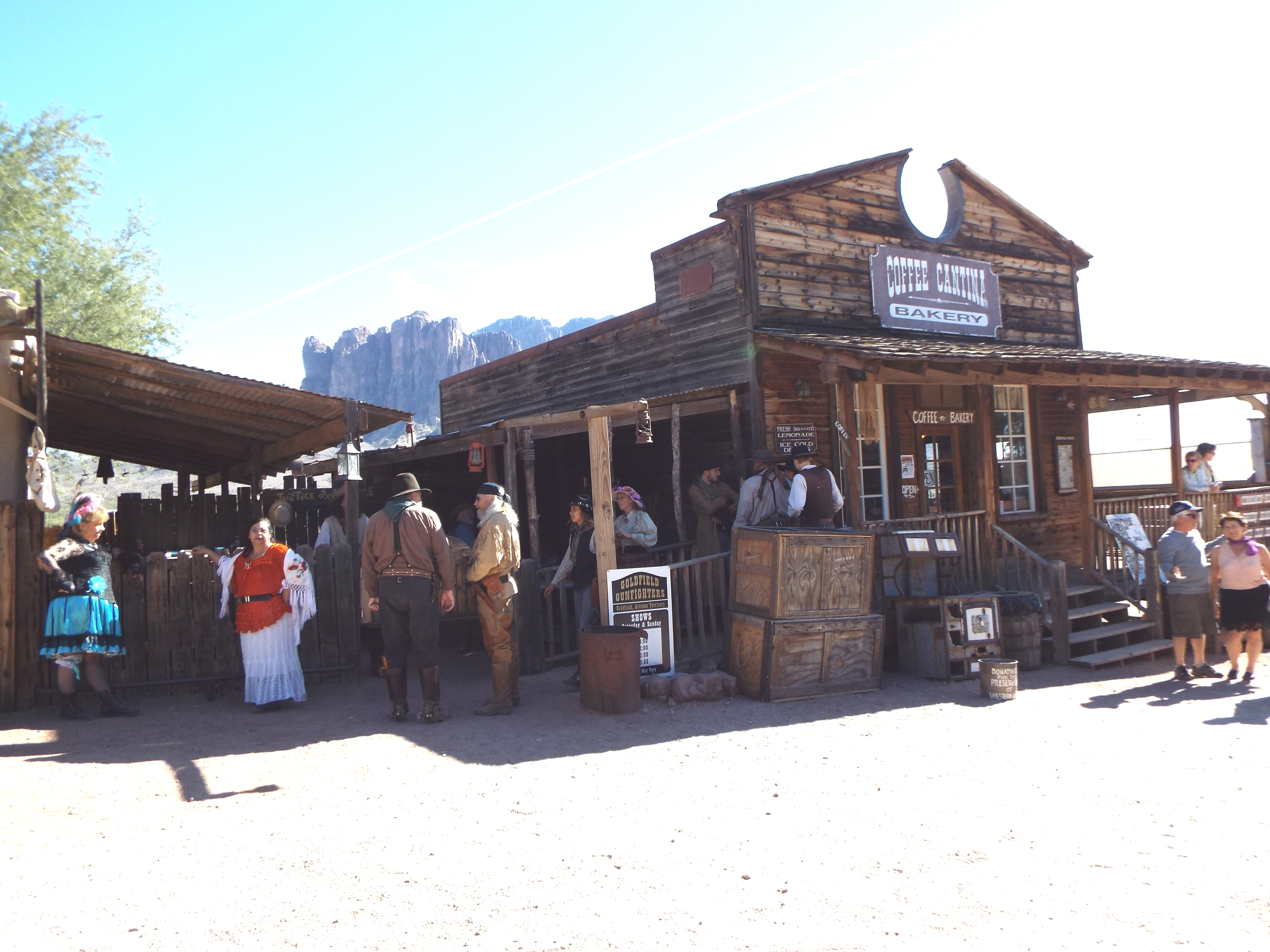
Cantina/Bakery

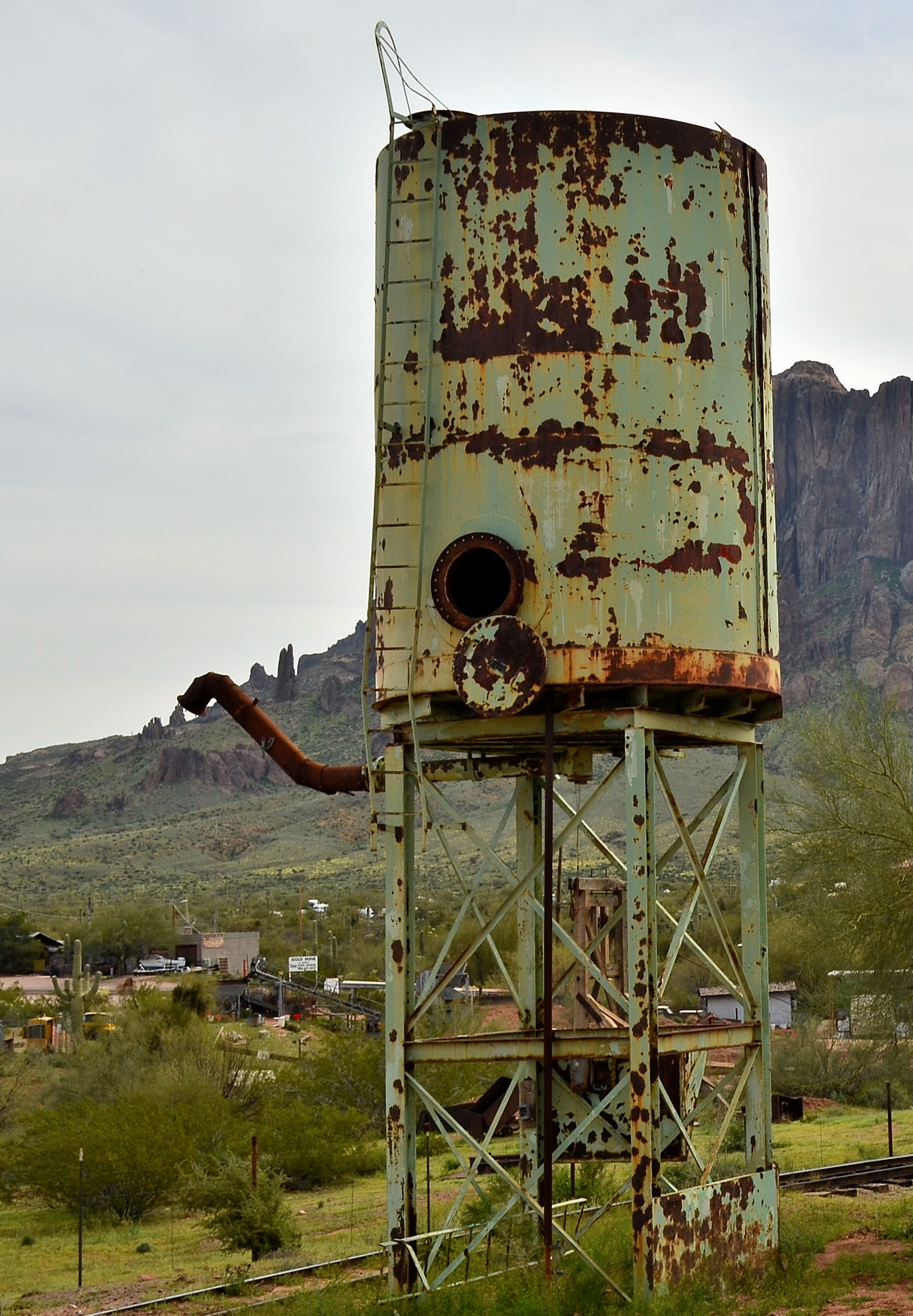
Metal railroad water tank.

== Goldfield Gunfighters reenactment ==
The following photographs are of a gunfight reenactment by the Goldfield Gunfighters in Goldfield.

The Goldfield Gunfighters

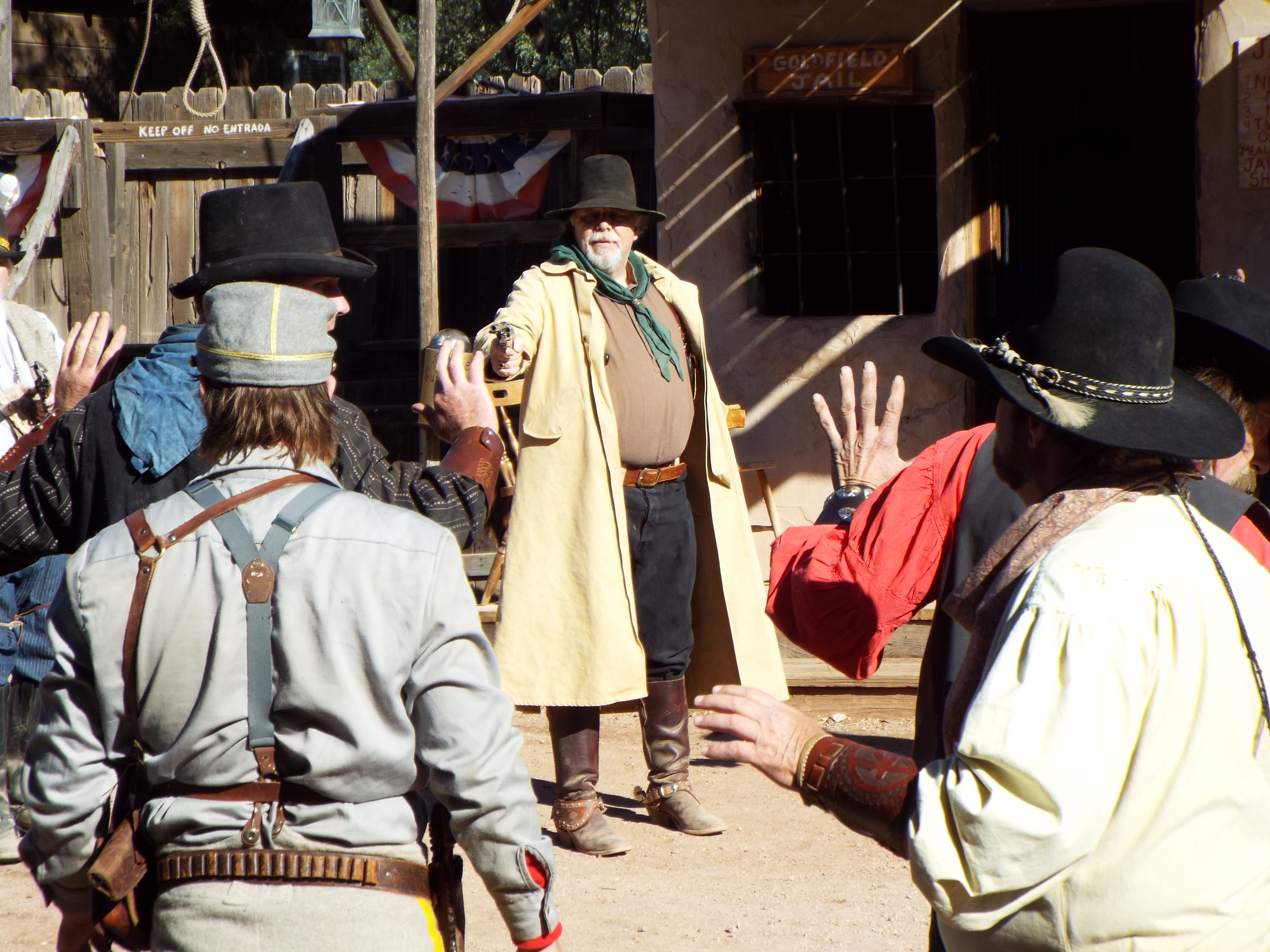
The Goldfield Gunfighters

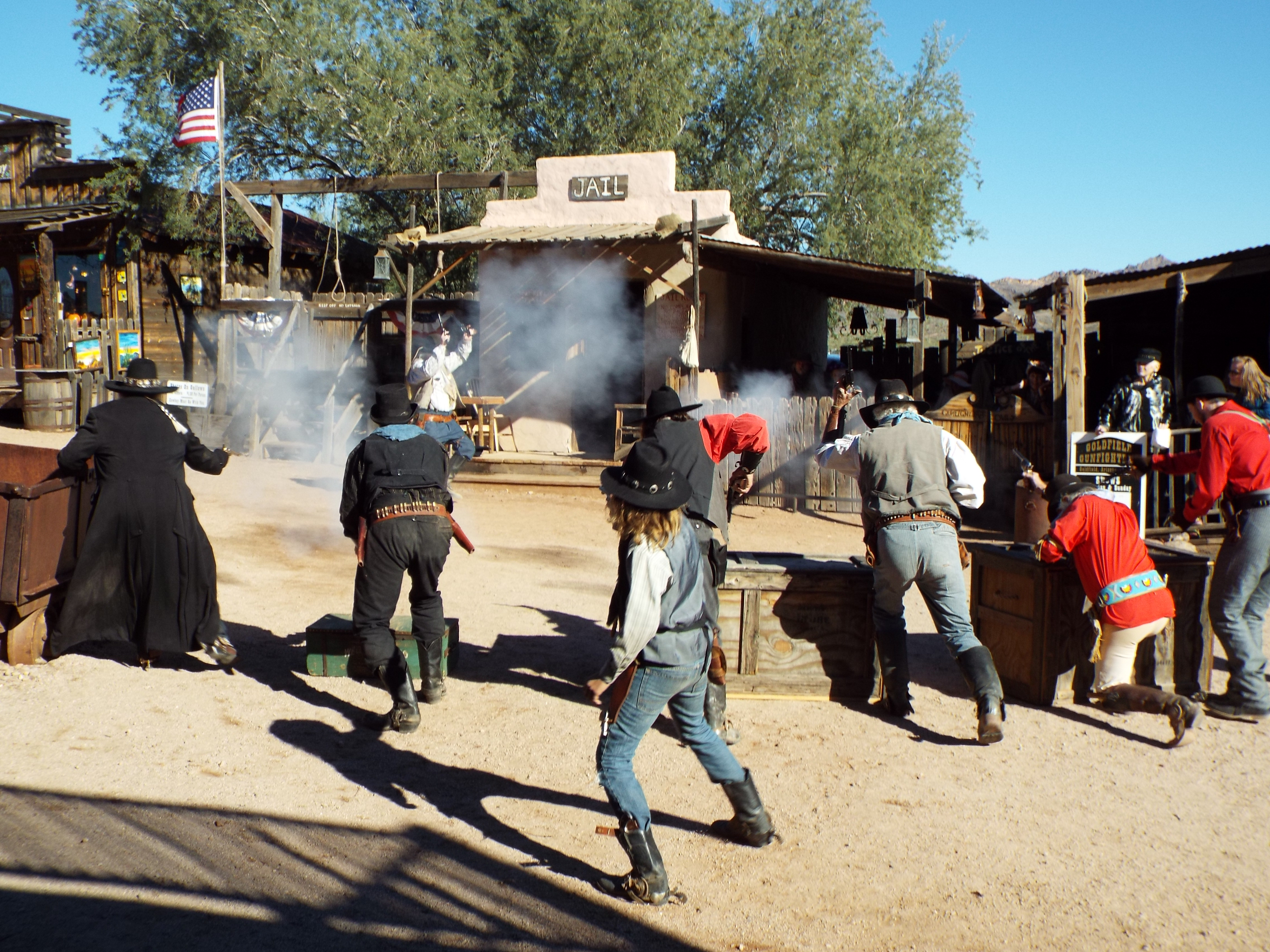

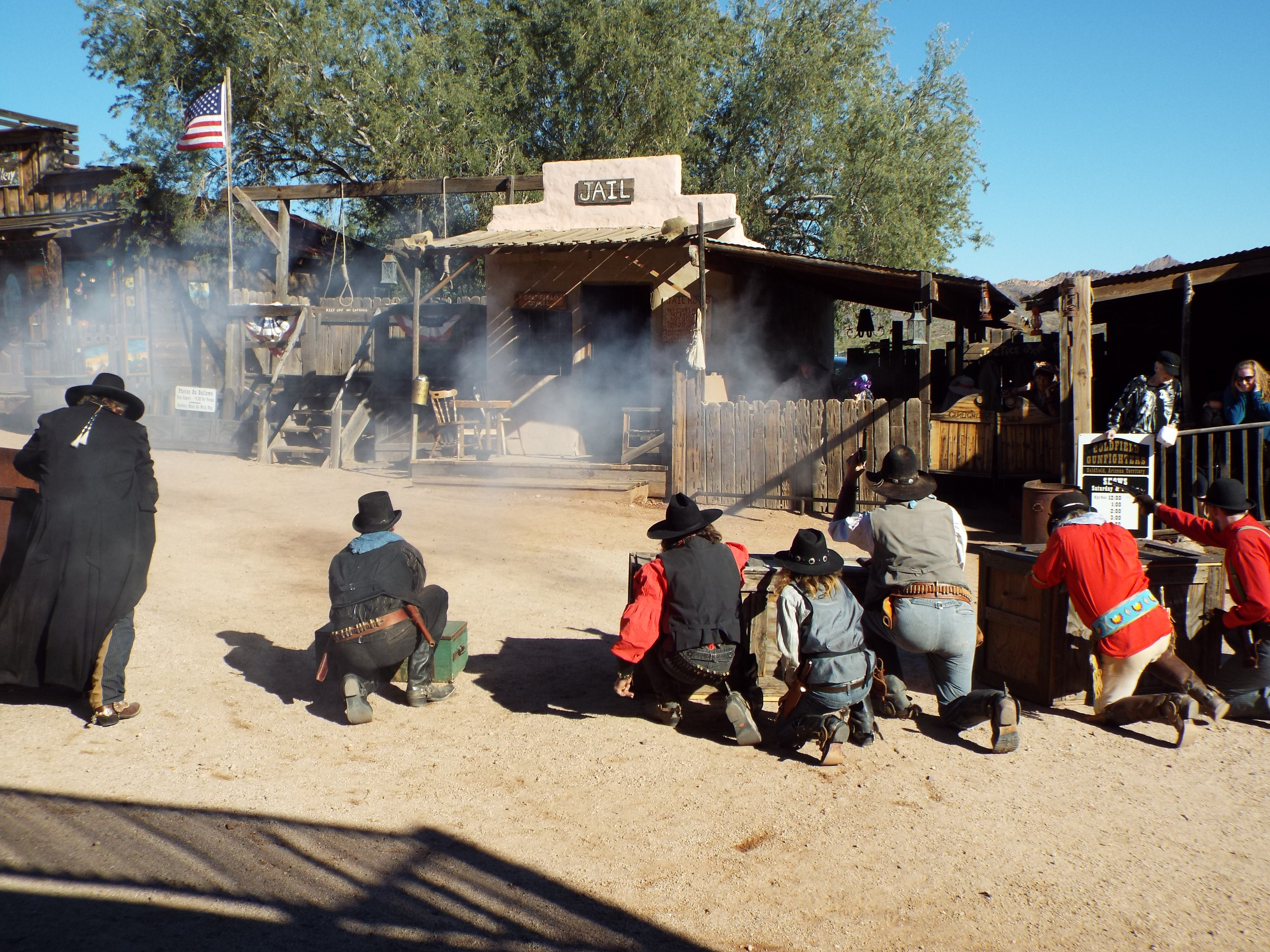

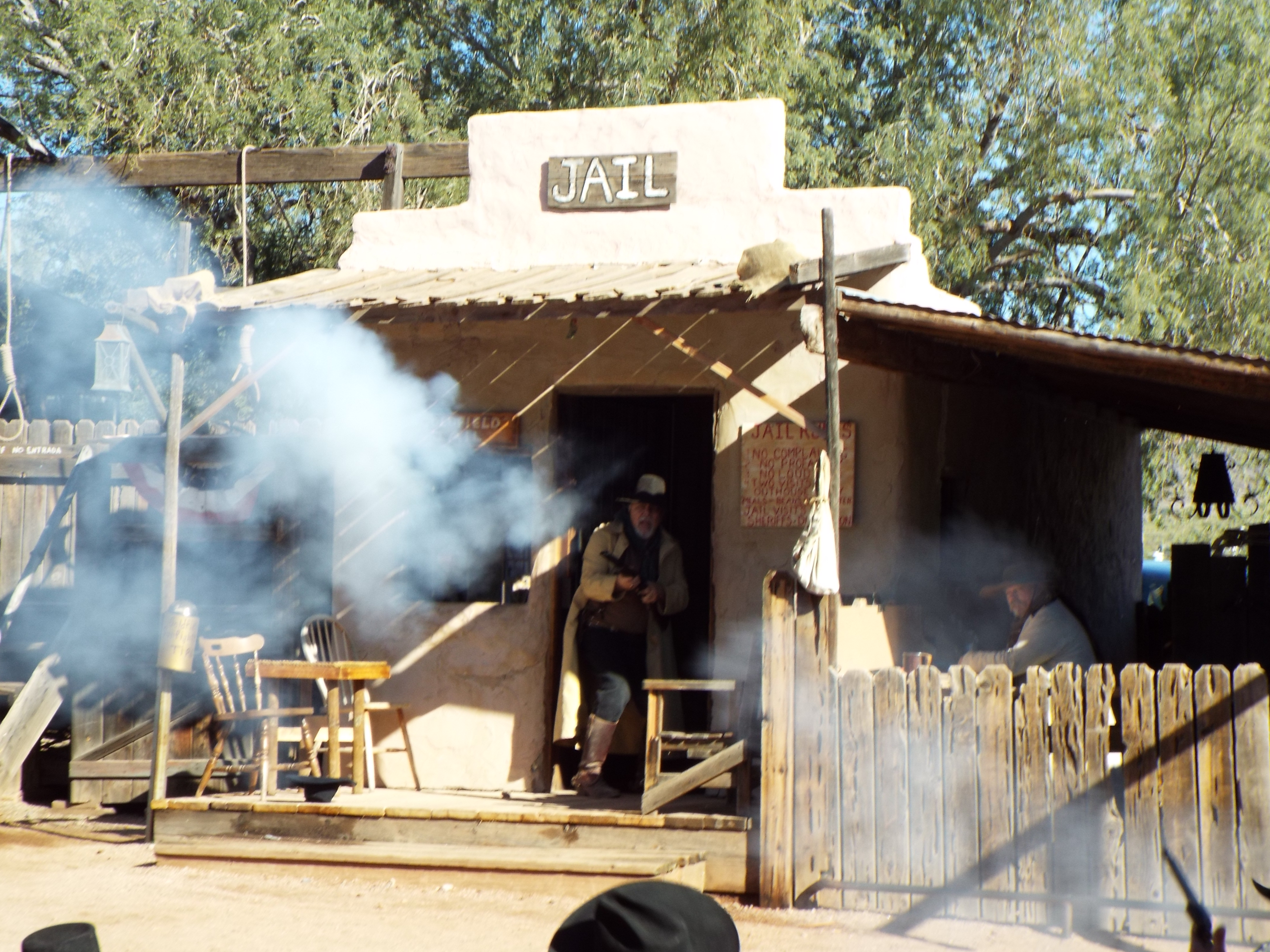

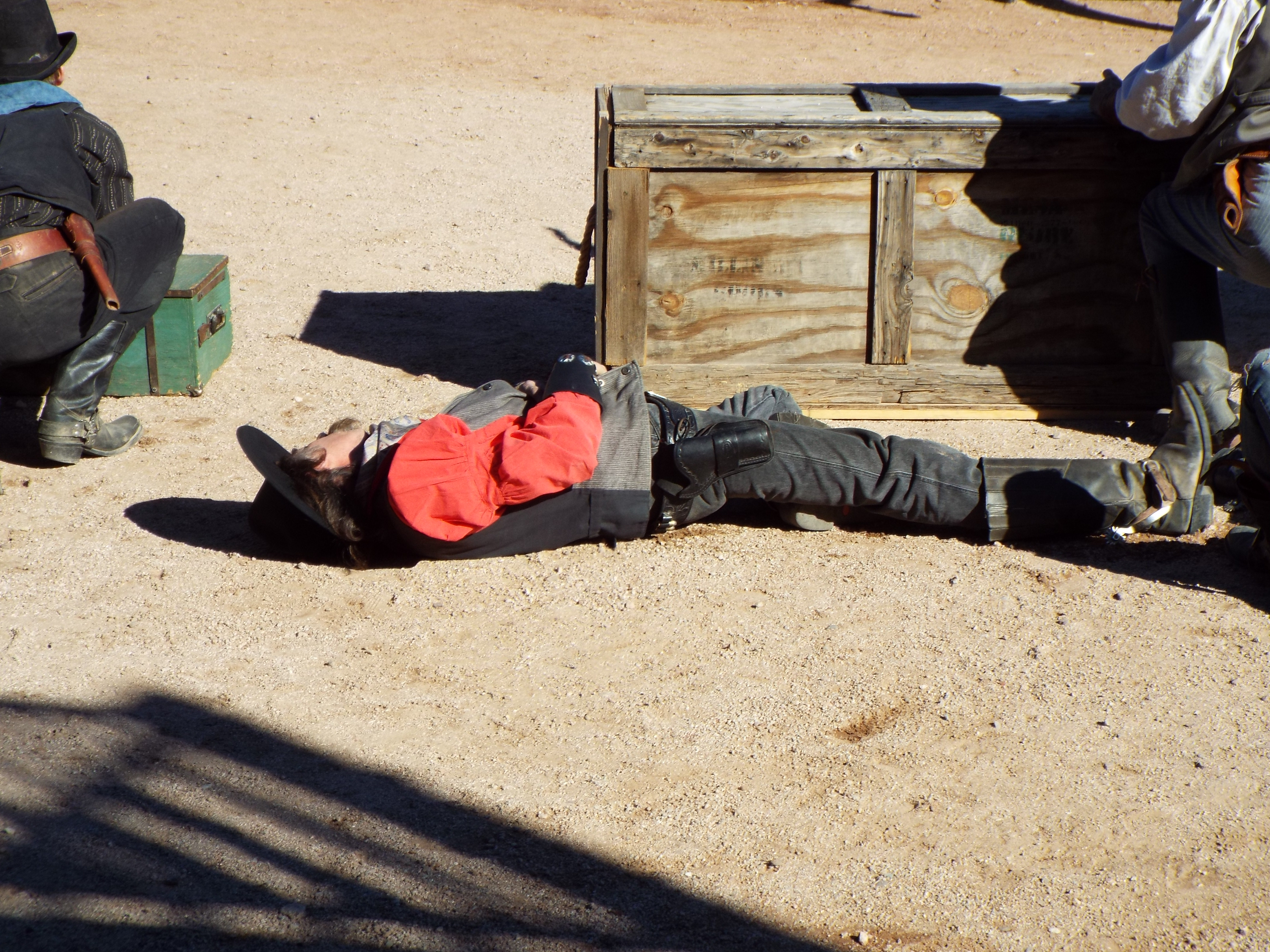

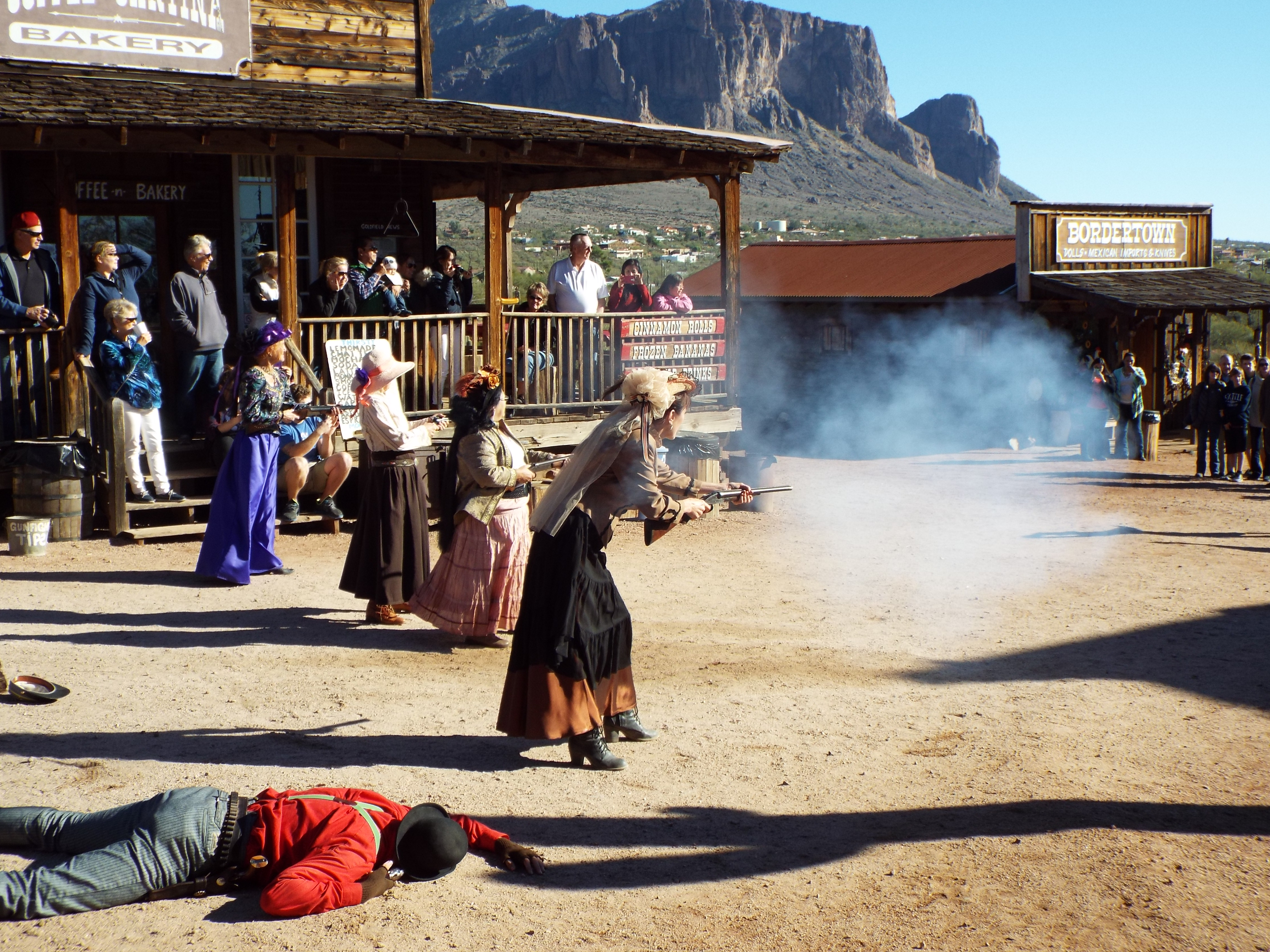

== See also ==
- Old Tucson Studios
- Pioneer Living History Museum
