= Goldfeld =

Goldfeld may refer to:

== Places ==
- Goldfield, Nevada, ghost town in Nevada, USA
- Goldfield Hotel in Goldfield, Nevada, was added to the Nevada State Register of Historic Places and was part of the scenery of many Ghost TV shows and movies

== Other uses ==
- Goldfeld (surname), people with the surname Goldfeld

== See also ==
- Goldfeld–Quandt test
- Anshel–Anshel–Goldfeld key exchange
