= Goldfeld (surname) =

Goldfeld is a Jewish East European surname, common among Ashkenazi Jews. Its meaning is 'gold field'.

Notable people with the surname include:

- Dorian M. Goldfeld (born 1947), American mathematician
- Ester Goldfeld (born 1993), American tennis player
- Sharon Goldfeld, Australian paediatrician and public health physician
- Stephen Goldfeld (1940–1995), American economist

== See also ==
- Goldfield (disambiguation)
- Goldberg (disambiguation)
- Gauldfeldt (disambiguation)
