= Jacaranda Music =

Non-profit organization

Jacaranda Music (2003-2024) was a non-profit organization founded by impresario Patrick Scott and conductor/organist Mark Alan Hilt. For twenty years, Jacaranda produced an annual classical music concert series of modern music and works written since 2000, as well as rare older classical music with potential interest for contemporary listeners. Jacaranda has been based in Santa Monica, California since 2003. In 2016, the series was named by L.A. Weekly as the Best Contemporary Classical Series. At the end of February 2024, Jacaranda ceased producing live concerts, capping their 20 year legacy with a double concert on February 25, 2024.

Throughout its 20 seasons, Jacaranda has presented the compositions of Philip Glass, John Cage, Olivier Messiaen, Gustav Mahler, Lou Harrison, Dylan Mattingly, Mark Grey, Florence Price, Lukas Foss, Julius Eastman, Frederic Rzewski, David Lang, Peter Maxwell Davies, Horatiu Radulescu, Franz Liszt and George Enescu, among many others. Musicians have included Grammy and Emmy winner Gloria Cheng, Anonymous 4, Quatuor Diotima, Scott Dunn, Kathleen Supové, Christopher Taylor, and Billy Childs. Jacaranda's concerts have been reviewed by several publications, including the LA Times, Classical Voice North America, and BBC Music Magazine. In 2018, The San Francisco Classical Voice said of Jacaranda: "To actually curate a concert is an art. It is one of the qualities that sets apart the Los Angeles music series Jacaranda. For more than 10 years… Jacaranda's concerts have been conceived as musical journeys of discovery…." The LA Times has said of Jacaranda that it "is known for imaginative programs of challenging contemporary music."

Los Angeles Times music critic Mark Swed said of Jacaranda in 2013, "With demanding pieces by Eötvös and the famed late Hungarian composer György Ligeti, "Fierce Beauty" was the most ambitious undertaking so far and by far for Jacaranda.…With this concert, Jacaranda grew up, moving beyond local to national significance."

Longtime music critic Alan Rich regularly wrote about Jacaranda, saying that they produce, "a kind of personalized programming so that you leave each event with the sense of having visited some very smart programming."

Since 2011, the Lyris Quartet has been its resident ensemble.

== Top 25 Most Programmed Composers ==
Composer	Birth/Death	Number of works performed (total performances)
Olivier Messiaen	1908-1992	32 (45)
Benjamin Britten	1913-1976	20 (23)
Charles Ives	1874-1954	19 (22)
Igor Stravinsky	1882-1971	15 (22)
Claude Debussy	1862-1918	14 (18)
John Cage	1912-1992	12 (17)
Maurice Ravel	1875-1937	11 (16)
Johann Sebastian Bach	1685-1750	11 (13)
Arnold Schoenberg	1874-1951	10 (13)
Alberto Ginastera	1916-1983	10 (12)
Wolfgang Amadeus Mozart	1756-1791	10 (12)
Thomas Adès	1971-	9 (11)
Lou Harrison	1917-2003	9 (10)
Luciano Berio	1925-2003	9 (9)
Steve Reich	1936-	8 (14)
Philip Glass	1937-	8 (14)
Franz Liszt	1811-1886	8 (10)
Leoš Janáček	1854-1928	8 (10)
Anton Webern	1883-1945	8 (10)
Pierre Boulez	1925-2016	8 (8)
Franz Schubert	1797-1828	7 (13)
John Adams	1947-	7 (11)
Arvo Pärt	1935-	7 (8)
David Lang	1957-	6 (9)
Antonín Dvořák	1841-1904	6 (8)
