= Youngberg, Arizona =

Unincorporated community in the state of Arizona, United States

- Populated place
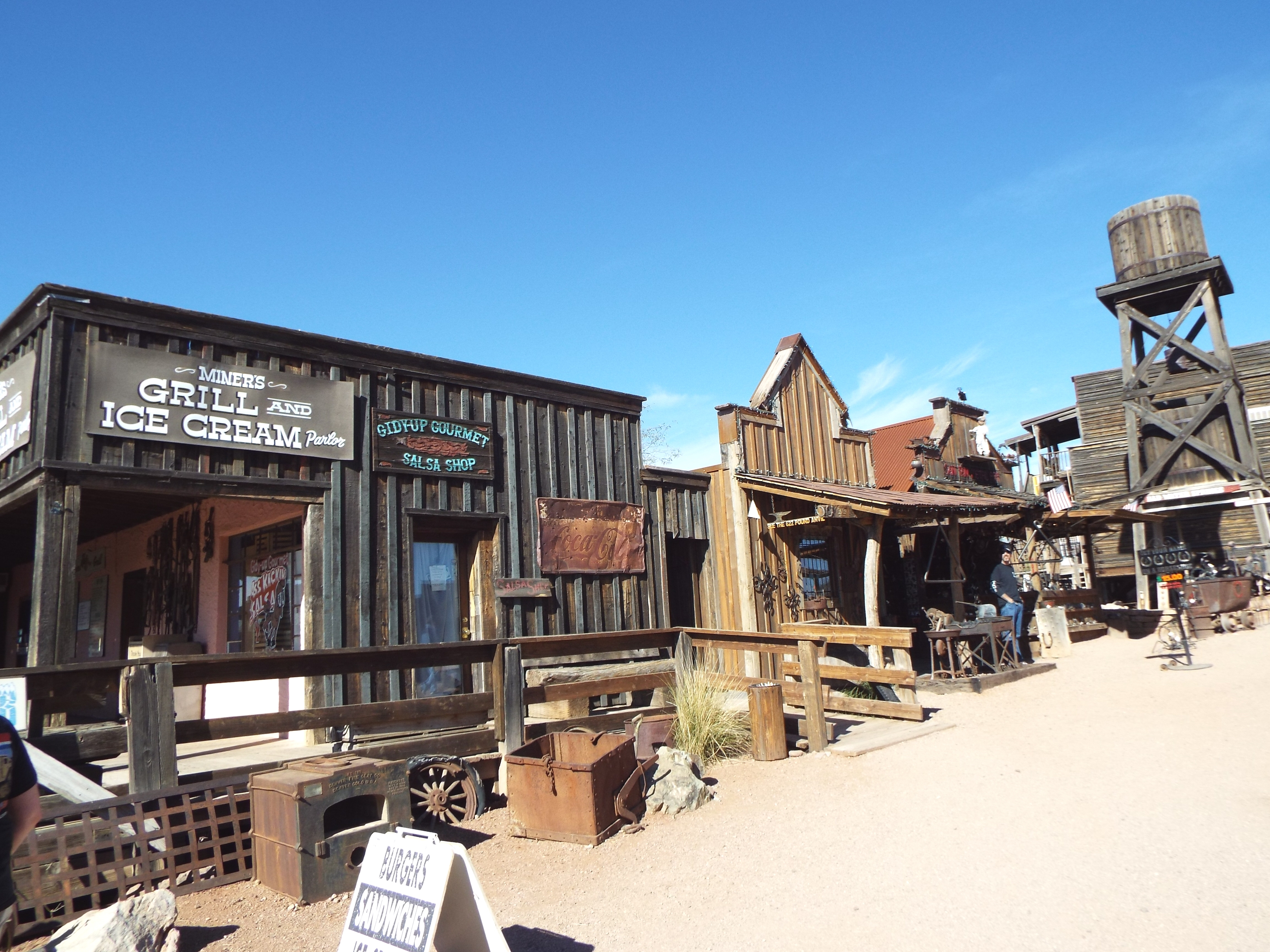
- Goldfield Ghost Town in Youngberg, December 2015

- Location within the state of Arizona Youngberg (the United States)
- Coordinates: 33°27′32″N 111°29′14″W
- Country: United States
- State: Arizona
- County: Pinal
- Elevation: 2,024 ft (617 m)
- Time zone: UTC-7 (Mountain (MST))
  - Summer (DST): UTC-7 (MST)
- Area code: 480
- FIPS code: 04-28240
- GNIS feature ID: 29401

Youngberg is a populated place situated in Pinal County, Arizona, United States.

== History ==
Originally called Goldfield due to the nearby gold mines, The Goldfield Post Office was established on October 7, 1893, with James L Patterson as its first Postmaster. This was the same year that George U. Young arrived. After his arrival, the community also became known as Youngsberg.

After a mining accident at his Goldfield mining operation, Young experienced a severe decline in his health, starting from about 1920 on, and in late 1925 he was rendered an invalid. He died from apparent apoplexy on November 26, 1926, at his vacation home near the Derby Mine. He was cremated and his remains interred at Phoenix's Greenwood/Memory Lawn Mortuary & Cemetery.

When the gold mines closed in 1897 the post office soon followed in 1898. The town depopulated, before a new small community developed, and became known under its current name, which was in honor of Young, who was the Secretary for the Arizona Territory from 1909 to 1910. The Apache Trail was constructed by the town in 1905. The Youngberg Post Office opened in 1920, and remained until 1926. It has an estimated elevation of 2,024 feet (617 m) above sea level.

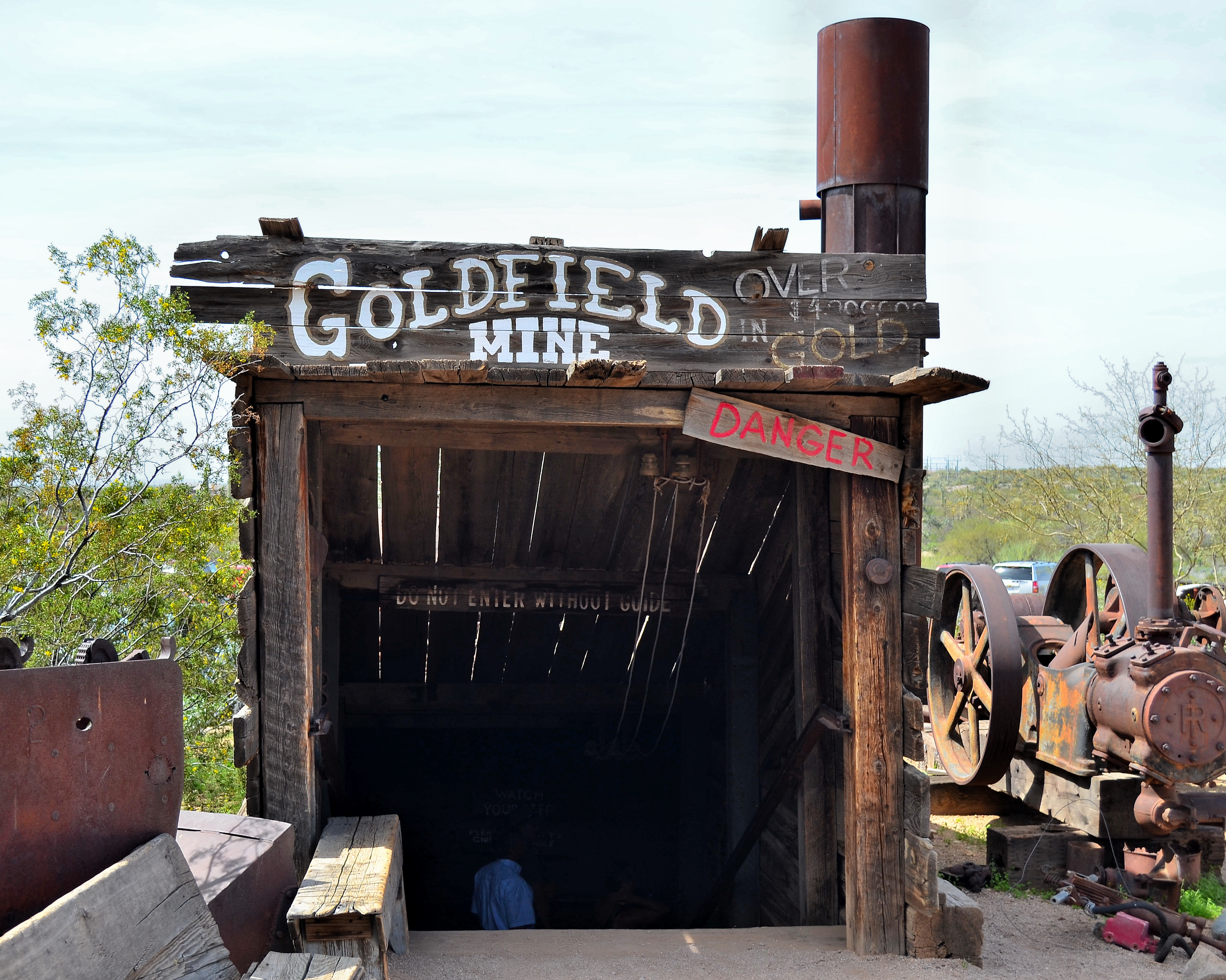
Goldfield Ghost Town mine entrance

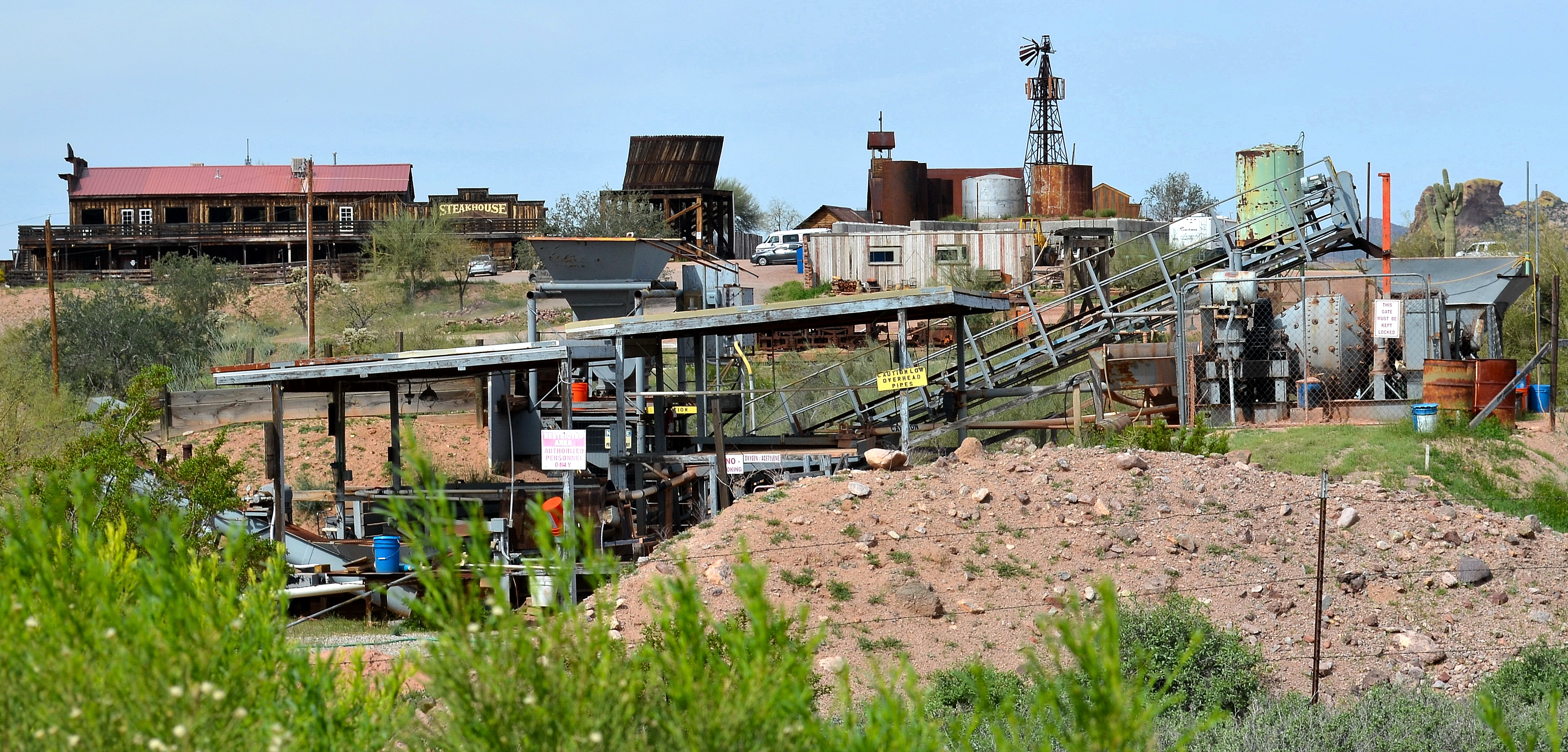
Mine adjacent to Goldfield Ghost Town

== See also ==
- List of historic properties in Youngberg, Arizona
- Highland Park, Yavapai County, Arizona (Derby Mine)
- George U. Young (Madizelle Mining Co.)
