= Goldfields (video game) =

- Developer: Jacaranda Software
- Publisher: Jacaranda Software
- Platforms: Apple II; BBC Micro; Commodore 64; MS-DOS; Classic Mac OS
- Release: 1986; 2007 (re-release)
- Genres: Educational, simulation
- Mode: Single-player

Goldfields is a video game for children which simulates 'life on the diggings' during a 19th-century gold rush. Beginning with a concept by Trevor Jacob, it was developed and published by Jacaranda Software in Australia in 1986. It was first released for Apple II, BBC Micro, Commodore 64 and IBM compatible systems. The first Macintosh version was later developed using Hypercard. The original Goldfields package contained a disk, teacher's guide, four black-line masters and a copy of A Goldfields Journal or A Guide to Prospective Gold Seekers. A review in Australian Educational Computing magazine described it as 'a particularly useful package, adaptable to a number of levels in both upper primary and secondary social science classes.' The game also received a favourable review from the Australian Journal of Reading in 1986. Despite its age, Goldfields remains well regarded as a mining-themed economic simulator with integrated action sequences.

Greygum Software acquired the rights to Goldfields published and versions for Windows and OS X in 2007.
