= Jacaranda Software =

Australian edutainment developer

- Industry: Video games
- Headquarters: Brisbane, Australia
- Key people: John Collins, Roseanne Gare, Bruce Mitchell, Gavin Hammond, David Smith, Steve Luckett

Jacaranda Software was an Australian developer and publisher of educational computer games for children. It was based in Brisbane, Australia and published under the leadership of John Collins. The team worked as a department of Jacaranda-Wiley; the Australian imprint of American publishing company, Wiley. While it was considered initially as an experimental venture, it proved to be profitable from its first year through to its closure in the early 1990s. Jacaranda Software released titles for a range of computer systems, including the Apple II, Commodore 64, Macintosh, Microbee and BBC Micro.

After the department closed, former employees David Smith, Bruce Mitchell, and Steve Luckett continued to write software for schools, under the name Greygum Software. They bought remaining stock, rights, and equipment from Jacaranda. Popular Jacaranda titles included Goldfields, Gold Dust Island, Kraken: a deep sea quest, Desert Quest and Crossing the Mountains.

Greygum Software later ceased operations.

== Releases ==
Title	Year	Known Versions	References
Animal Rescue	1989	Apple II	
Bush Rescue	1987	Apple II, BBC	
Cardsharp	1988	Apple II, BBC	
Cave Surveyor	1985	BBC	
Clockwise: Time activities for the whole primary school	1992	Apple II, BBC	
Crossing the Mountains	1989	Apple II, BBC	
Cunning Running	1984	Apple II, C64, Microbee	
Desert Quest	1984	Apple II, BBC, Macintosh	
Dinosaur Discovery	1985	Apple II, BBC	
Fleetfoot Express	1992	Apple II	
Gold-Dust Island	1984	Apple II, BBC, C64, Microbee	
Goldfields	1986	Apple II, BBC, C64, DOS, Macintosh, Windows	
Jacaranda Maths 10 Software	1989		
Kraken: A deep-sea quest	1989	Apple II, BBC, C64, Macintosh	
Maths Bingo	1991	Apple II, BBC	
Paws	1986	Apple II	
Pieces of Eight	1986		
Quick-Cartage Company	1984	Apple II, BBC, C64, Microbee	
Raft-Away River	1984	Apple II, BBC, C64, Microbee	
Scavenger Hunt	1984	Apple II, BBC, Microbee	
Sheep-Dog Trial	1984	Apple II, C64, Microbee	
Terra Australis: Voyages of trade and discovery	1988	Apple II, BBC	
Transformations	1986	Apple II, BBC	
The Tycoon Itch	1986	Apple II, BBC, C64	
Vegetable Patch	1987	Apple II	
Vote 1	1986	Apple II, BBC	
Wordsmith	1985	Apple II, BBC	
Wordswork	1985	Apple II, BBC	
Wheat Farmer	1990	Apple II, BBC	
Zoopak	1987	Apple II, BBC	
