= Highland Park, Yavapai County, Arizona =

Highland Park, Arizona
- Populated place
- Highland Pines
- Nickname: 'Derby Mine'
- Location within the state of Arizona Highland Park (the United States)
- Coordinates: 34°33′33″N 112°34′09″W
- Country: United States
- State: Arizona
- County: Yavapai
- Elevation: 6,411 ft (1,954 m)
- Time zone: UTC-7 (Mountain (MST))
  - Summer (DST): UTC-7 (MST)
- Area code: 928
- FIPS code: 04-32805
- GNIS feature ID: 38504

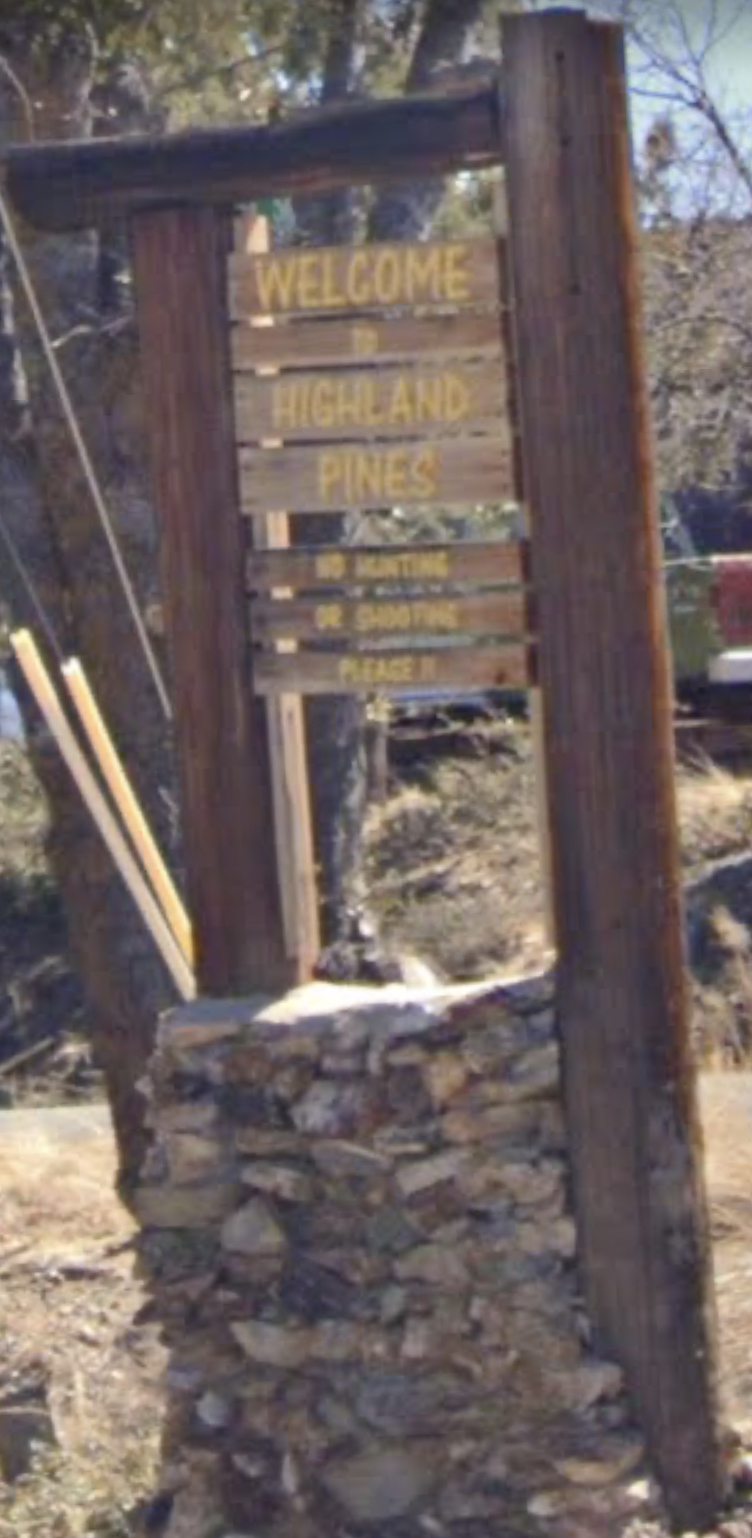
Highland Pines, Prescott, Arizona

Highland Park, also known as Highland Pines, is a populated place situated near Prescott and within the Prescott National Forest, in Yavapai County, Arizona, United States. Highland Pines is the promotional name associated with the Highland Park areas several subdivisions. In the Arizona Territorial era up to 1912, and Statehood until around the late 1920s, this particular area of land acted as a cattle ranch with a mining history, lies within the Thumb Butte Mining District, which appears to be initially platted by the Arizona Corporation Highland Pine Properties Inc. beginning in the late 1950s.

== History of the land ==
Highland Pines has a rich history of mining prospects, mining claims, and cattle ranching. It is located in the Sierra Prieta region, in the Thumb Butte mining district, about halfway between Iron Springs and West Spruce Mountain. During the late 1800s and early 1900s, lode mining claims were purportedly located by several different prospectors, who identified these claims in and near the area that is now known as Highland Pines under the Mining Act which allowed prospectors to survey and claim public lands in the western states. The stated purpose of this law was to open the mineral claims in the public lands of the United States to exploration and purchase (from the government).

== Highland Pine Properties ==
Highland Pines Properties came into existence out of a series of 'quit claim' deeds, deriving from the controversial 1920 patenting of land at the site of U.S. Mineral Survey 2424. The subdivisions of Highland Pines where then cut from the projected conjectural lottings within the purported lode claims, as delineated on the plat map of Mineral Survey 2424, from 1907. The superimposed Yavapai County positioning of the lode claims by name were likely assumed after a dependent resurvey of the entire township in the 1930s, referred to as the Kinsey plat, was ordered by presidential executive order. This resurvey was supposed to finish or correct the township plat of 1871, but it failed to account for the graft(s) within, which do not appear to have been questioned, and thus not investigated as to their validity of private title.

The plat map(s) of record, tie the lots of Highland Pines to nearby section corners of the public land survey system, which appear as the corner to sections 28, 27, 33 & 34 at township 14 north, range 3 west, Gila Salt River Meridian, although none existed at the time in 1907. There exists several discrepancies in the official records of the M.S. 2424 mining claim's platted configuration and relation to the section corners between the 1871 plat and the 1936 plat. An inaccurate placement, and overall representation of the purported "initial site", which was not in conformity to the rules of construction to begin with, has been carried forward to present day.

An initial play on the spread of a fictitious, or at best unfinished skeletal township survey from 1871, by a known Benson Syndicate surveyor Solomon Foreman, under approval of John Wasson, who was the Surveyor General of the Arizona Territory, set the stage for the concerted theoretical lode claim platting of the Derby Mining Company's various relocated lode claims. All of the Highland Pines inception land matters derive from the time period of planning for the future control of water for Prescott, Arizona, and after J.J. Fisher had reportedly scouted the land of this area with the brother of Binger Hermann, Commissioner of the United States General Land Office, and created mineral survey 2424 among several other plats in the area. A variation between the Spenazuma swindle and Looters of the Public Domain, has effectively created 'cadastral mayhem' at the controversial land site, known presently as Highland Pines in Prescott, Arizona. Every document in the chain of deeds to all Highland Pines 'private property', is based upon an identified legal description to the 1907 Mineral Survey 2424. "Returning to the title itself, the rules are clear even though the supporting information is scant: without a bona fide title, there can be no boundaries. If title does not exist, neither can its elements."

== Derby Mining Company (Derby Mine Swindle) ==
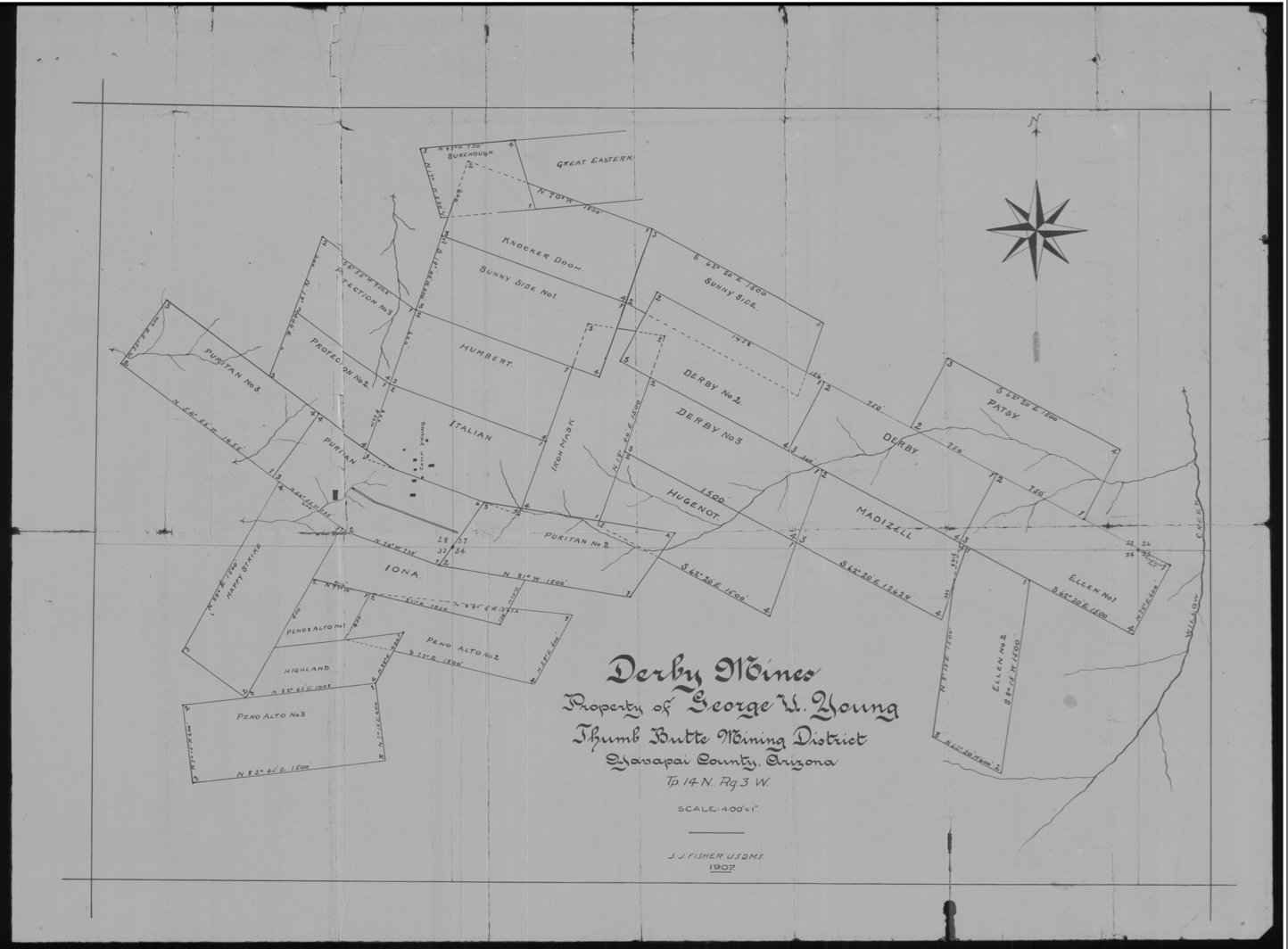
Derby Mines, Property of George U. Young, 1907

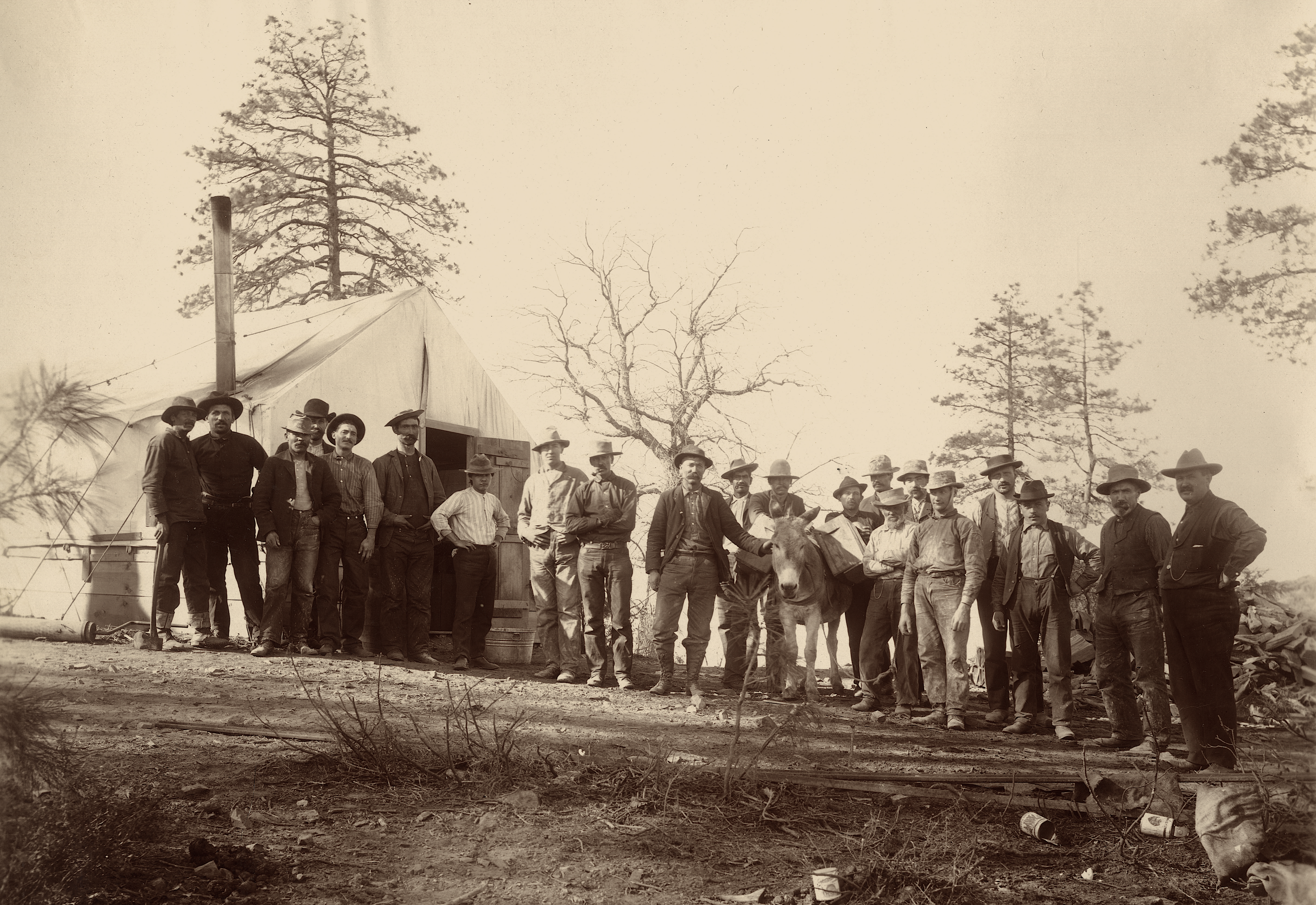
Miners in Thumb Butte Mining District

In the early 1900s, the efforts promoting the sale of stock in The Derby Mining Company, (later morphing into the Madizelle Mining Company by George U. Young in 1908), resulted in the creation of United States land entry records, by way of the United States General Land Office in Arizona. George U. Young was a mining promoter in the Territory, publicly promoting himself, the sale of unregulated stock offerings to eastern investors, as well as his related mining prospects since the late 1890s. Colorful histories surround most of the mines in Arizona.

In 1912, Geo. U. Young sat as a director on the Phoenix Real Estate Board, which also operated from the same building block at 403-404 Fleming in downtown Phoenix, present site of the Wells Fargo tower. Young acted as president and lessee of the Derby Mining Company, E.M. Sanford was the vice president, as well as a Yavapai County judge and district attorney, R.H. Shoemaker its secretary, and F.O. Polson as treasurer, publicly offering capital stock, which was primarily issued through brokers to investors on the east coast. Regularly used by Young was his office letterhead, which read: 'Stocks, Bonds, Lands, Investments; Land and Irrigation Projects Examined; Mine Reports a Specialty.' Young's mining prospects were well known throughout the Thumb Butte District, where present day Highland Park is centered.

From about 1902 to May 1907, George U. Young and associates like James R. Lowry, George W. Sarano, Samuel Hill and E.M. Sanford made many efforts in the area to fulfill his ultimate concept, which was to sell the vision of the Derby Mining Company's land area, as a fixed visual representation of what became a preliminary drawing for 'Derby Mines'. After a few lawsuits, some local court judgements, and at least a few accidental deaths, 'The Derby' was reborn.

On June 17, 1907, the U.S. Surveyor General for Arizona issued official survey instructions for mineral survey twenty four-twenty four to J.J. Fisher, a U.S. Deputy Mineral Surveyor. After the purported mineral entry was made, this effort resulted in the foundation of present-day Highland Pines, the 'Plat of the (Mining) Claim of George U. Young, which was incorporated into land patent documents, to the later Madizelle Mining Co. Official records indicate the mineral plat represents twenty five lode mining claims situated in the Thumb Butte Mining District: Puritan, Puritan No. 2, Puritan No. 3, Iron Mask, Derby, Derby No. 2, Derby No. 3, Ellen No. 1, Ellen No. 2, Madizelle, Huguenot, Patsy, Humbert, Italian, Happy Strike, Sunny Side No. 1, Sunny Side, Surenough, Penos Alto No. 1, Penos Alto No. 2, Penos Alto no. 3, Highland, Knocker Doom, Protection No.2 and Protection #3. This is only one aspect to the overall picture at hand.

Young is also associated with several other prospective lode mining claim location notices, for claims throughout the Highland Park area. One of his first locations in Thumb Butte Mining District is known as the 'Accidental' Lode Mining Claim. Additional lode mining claims situated in the Thumb Butte Mining District are the Isabella, Big Ben No. 1, Big Ben No. 2, Ellen M., Iona, Great Eastern, Last Chance (J.J. Fisher), Star, Lowry Hill, Lowry Cross, Ohio, Norman, Summit, Edgar, Alto, and Protection. Prominent locators working with Young in the early 1900s included Thomas Smith, Frank Polson, Thomas C. Hill, Silas 'S.P.' Hill, James R. Lowry, James Samuels, E.L. Sharpneck, George W. Sarano, Norman Hale, J.C. Forest, and Joseph Dougherty. The mining efforts here were all greatly served by the simple flag station with one switch, known by local miners as Summit Station otherwise known as Sierra Prieta on the Santa Fe, Prescott and Phoenix Railway. This was promoted as the main delivery system for the hauling of heavy equipment to the alleged mining activity in the area. One source identifies the intention in the early 1900s to have had the former railroad connect along the ridge to present day Highland Pines, up to two miles to the south, from Prieta flag station.

== Cattle ranching ==
While simultaneously forging forward with plans for the land under the provisions of the Mining Act, the area related to Young's 'Derby Mines' was doubling as a literal cattle ranch, complete with pastures, wire fencing, corrals, hay bale deliveries and open range for the various stock, which was initially kept under a watchful eye of a full-time caretaker named J.E. 'the old man' Wilson. The future of the cattle business in the area redirected the interests of several of the original Lode claimants, beginning in the latter part of the 1880s, when the original vein of the Lowry was purportedly discovered.

After the passing of Dan Goggin, Wilson resided in one of several homes constructed at the heart of what he promoted to be the Derby. After the death of the first caretaker, George U. Young placed a wanted ad in the Republic, which read: 'Wanted-Man and wife...to look after stock and do general work; wife to work around the house and must be a good cook.' Ultimately in about December 1912, a man named Fred J. Smith from the nearby Centipede Mine, where he was already working for the interests of George U. Young, came to what was referred to as the Derby area with his wife Ada E. Smith, where they resided with for many years. Fred Smith was aware of his main duty of looking over the site and protecting the purported claim from future claim jumpers.

There are several rules within the General Mining Act of 1872 that locators must follow. A mine is a prospect which has graduated into a profitable undertaking. A property which does not profit, or one that is not up to this particular stage in its development, cannot yet meet the definition of a 'mine'. Not all prospects become mines, and not all mines stay or can stay profitable. The works treatment of a mines ore bodies has the requirement of one already having been thoroughly established, and also showing a continuing profit.

A financially viable treatment must be established in order for the classification of an established 'mine' to exist. It is a fraudulent misrepresentation to state upon public offerings of the company seeking prospective capital or further capital in a 'mine' when the property itself is likely nothing more than just a prospect. A prospect is a property were there is an expectation that mineral bearing ores may be obtained. A property that is a 'pit' by definition, is distinguished from a 'mine' in that stones are likely being removed, however the property is simply nothing more than a 'quarry'. A prospect, a proved prospect, a mine an established mine have very different definitions.

Department of the Interior (DOI) decisions require a discovery on 'each claim based on an actual physical exposure of the mineral deposit within the claim boundaries.' The DOI's holding in Jefferson-Montana Copper Mines Co., 41 L.D. 321 (1912), established the full test for a lode claim:

"To constitute a valid discovery upon a lode claim, three elements are necessary:

- There must be a vein or lode of quartz or other rock-in-place;
- The quartz or other rock-in-place must carry gold or some other valuable mineral deposit;
- The two preceding elements, when taken together, must be such that as to warrant a prudent man in the expenditure of his time and money in the effort to develop a valuable mine.

The key word here is: valuable. As in a discovery (property) which holds monetarily exchangeable resources at a profit. This after the prudent man expends his time, his money, and his efforts, finds that those resources as allotted, are still financially valuable to him.

== Madizelle Mining Company ==
On June 6, 1908, the Madizelle Mining Company was incorporated under the laws of the Territory of Arizona. The incorporators were Andrew A. Blair (President), J. Edward Whitfield (Secretary & Treasurer), Fred W. Taylor (Director), Charles M. Taylor Jr. (Director), of Philadelphia, Pennsylvania, all of the City of Philadelphia, County of Philadelphia, State of Pennsylvania and George U. Young (Vice President & General Manager) of Prescott, County of Yavapai, Territory of Arizona.

The nature of business as listed on the companies Articles of Incorporation: 'A general mining, milling and smelting business, buying, selling, bonding, etc., mines, mining claims, water rights, ores and bullion; building roads, etc.; to acquire mining property water rights, etc., and to work the same; to mine for gold, silver, copper, etc.; to sell, mortgage or otherwise dispose of the property of the company; to deal in its own stock and that of other corporations, etc. etc.' The big idea of the Madizelle Mining Company was essentially a covering over of the Derby Mining Company's historical efforts at the same alleged site, painting a new positive picture to the public, selling the former theoretical land site as a whole, being the promise of profitable mine investment to out of area investor(s). Mineral survey 2424 was used to effectuate these efforts, prior to any application for patenting of the site. Prior to 1921, several references to M.S. 2424 as being a 'patent approved' survey to the 25 lode claims illustrated on the plat of record, are found in public record, among Young's sunny efforts to sell the alleged mining project for a large profit.

On October 26, 1916, an amendment was made to the articles of incorporation of the Madizelle Mining Company. Near the time of application for land patent, Young was given power of attorney on behalf of the Madizelle Mining Company. On March 6, 1920, Application 045620 for Phoenix Serial Patent 818495 was made by the Madizelle Mining Company for certain lands embraced in Mineral Survey No. 2424. Included in the application for patent was the Field Notes of the survey of the mining claims, Power of attorney from Madizellle Mining Company to George U. Young, Proof of posting notice and diagram on claim, Three copies of the notice for publication, One notice of application for patent, Certificate and proper authority showing Madizelle Mining Company duly organized and prepared to do business within the State, Plat of survey of said mining claims approved by the Surveyor General.

== Gallery ==
Mineral Survey 2424 M.S. 2424

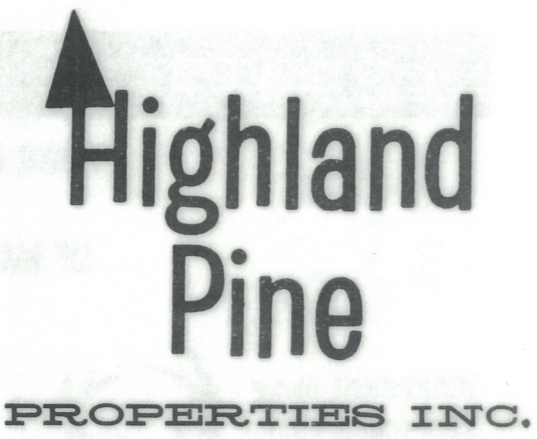
Highland Pines-Highland Pine Properties Inc., Logo 1957

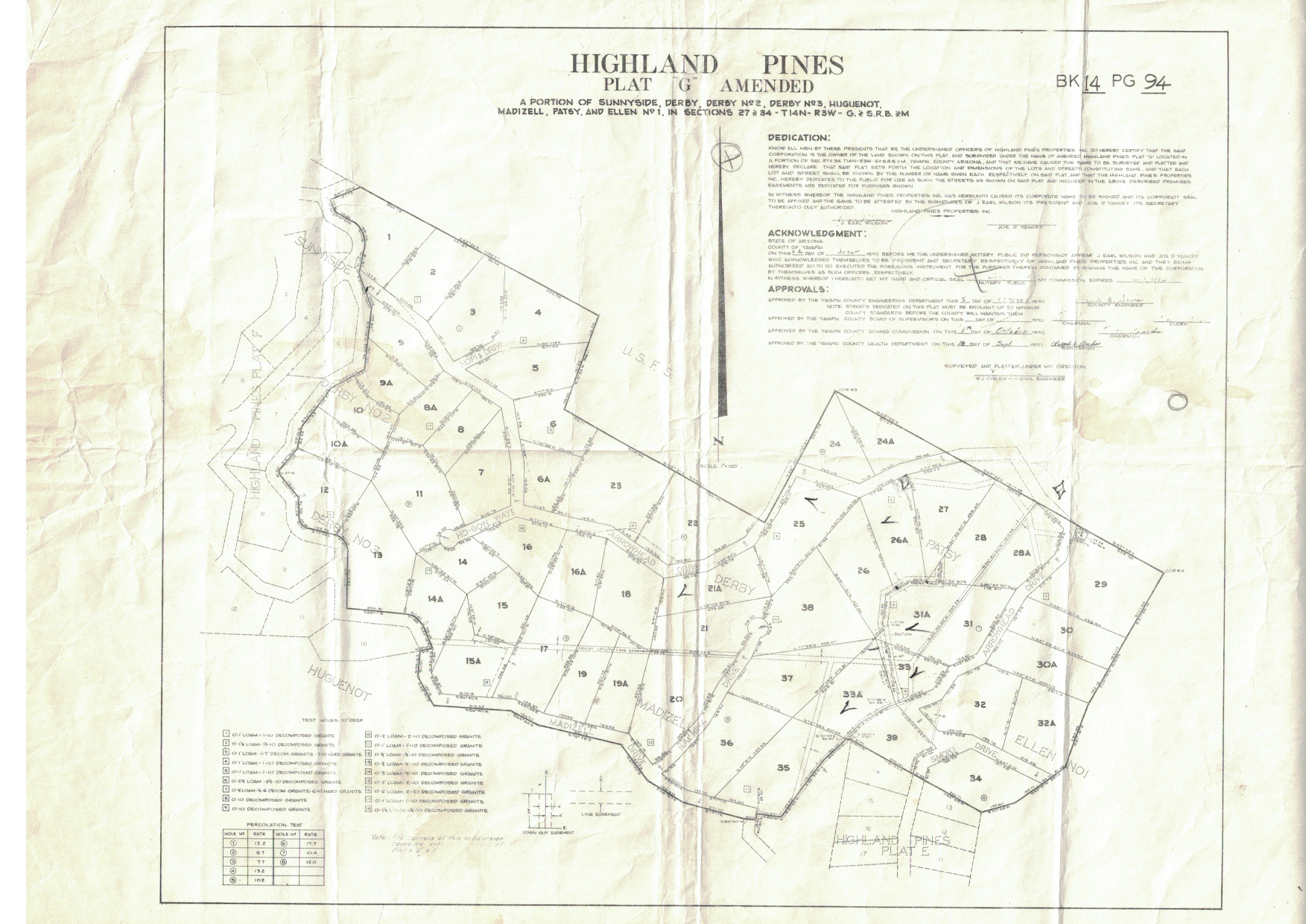
Highland Pines Plat G Amended, Highland Pines Properties, Inc. 1970

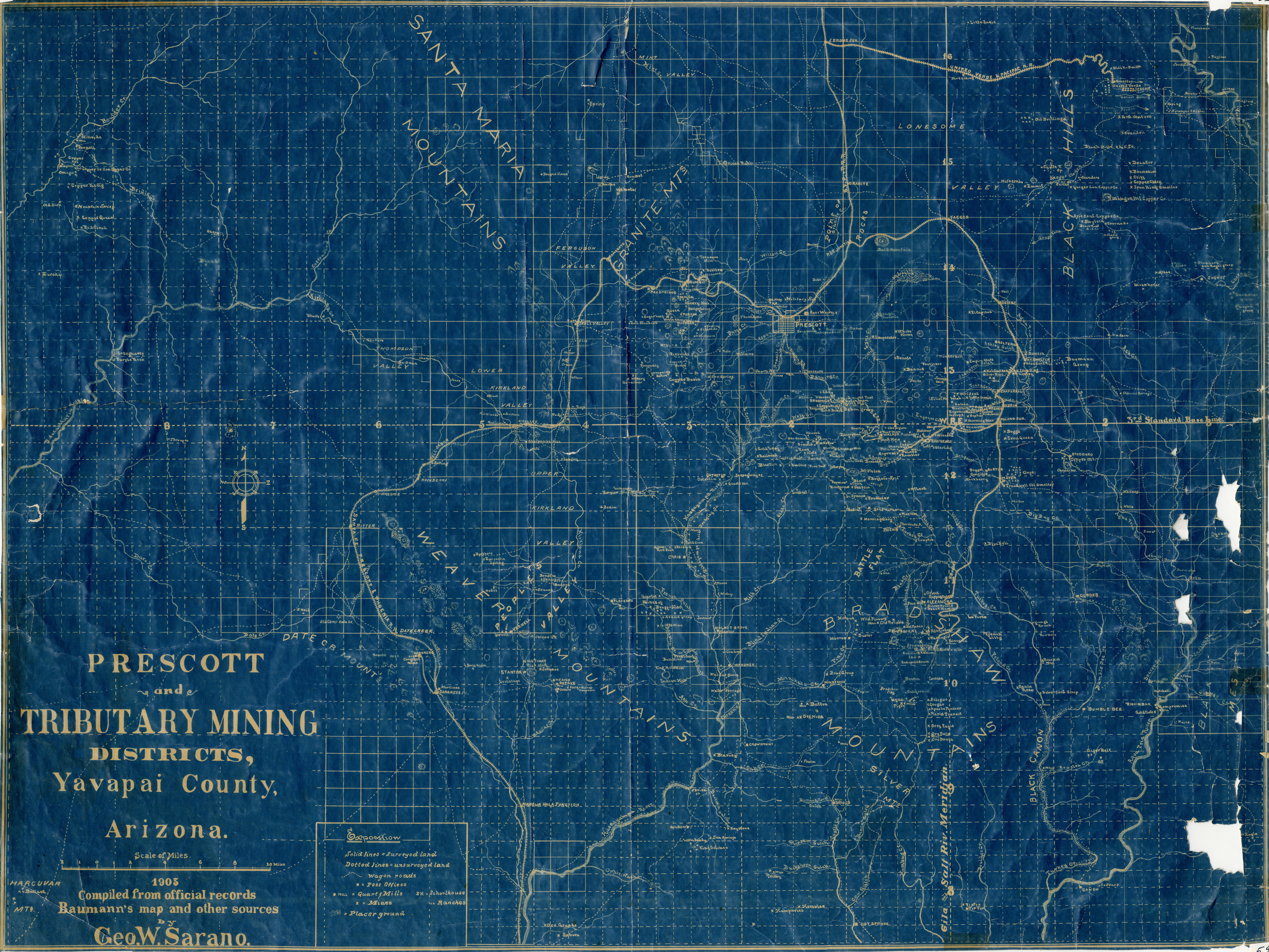
Original Highland Pines, AZ Map

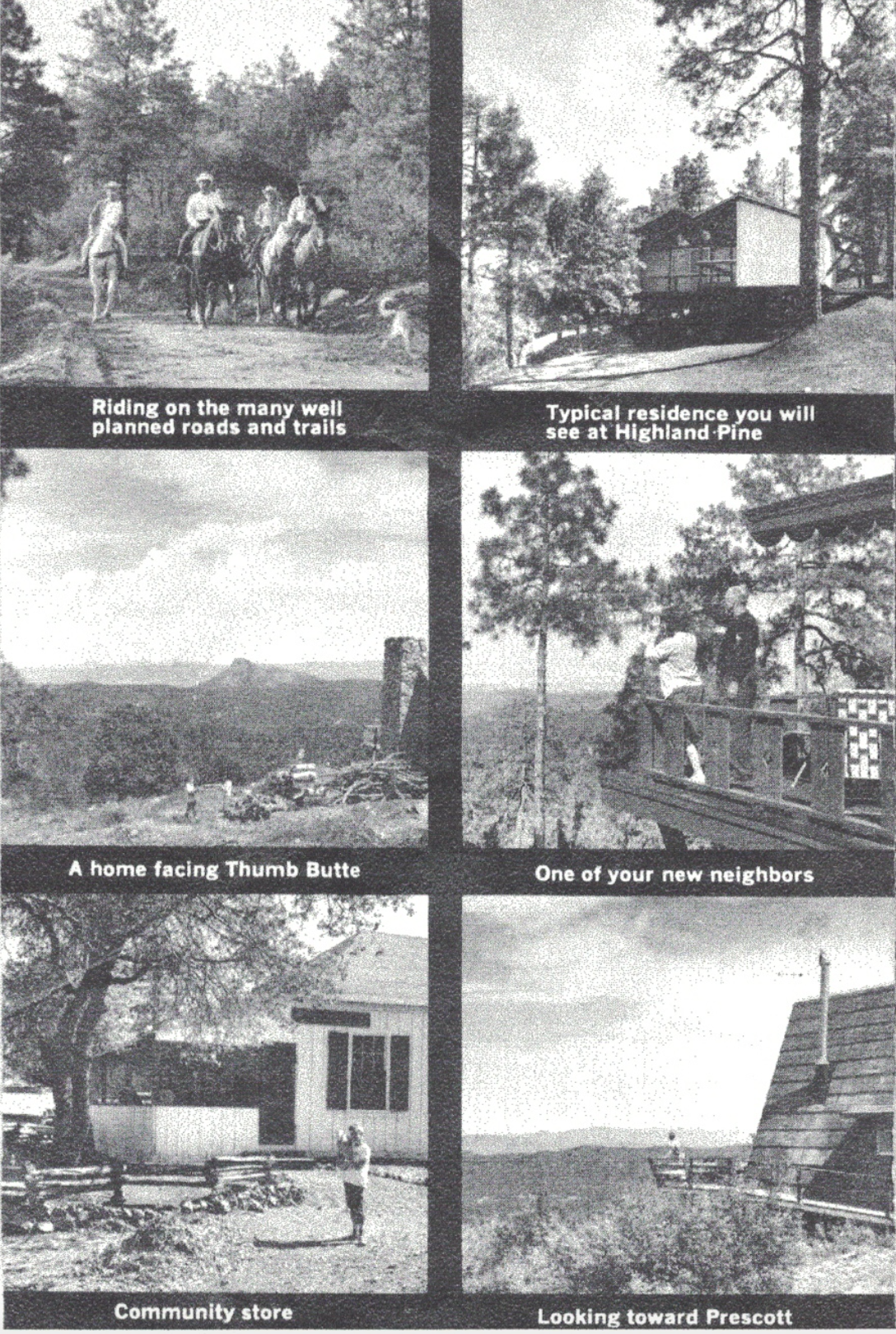
Highland Pines Properties, Sales Promotional

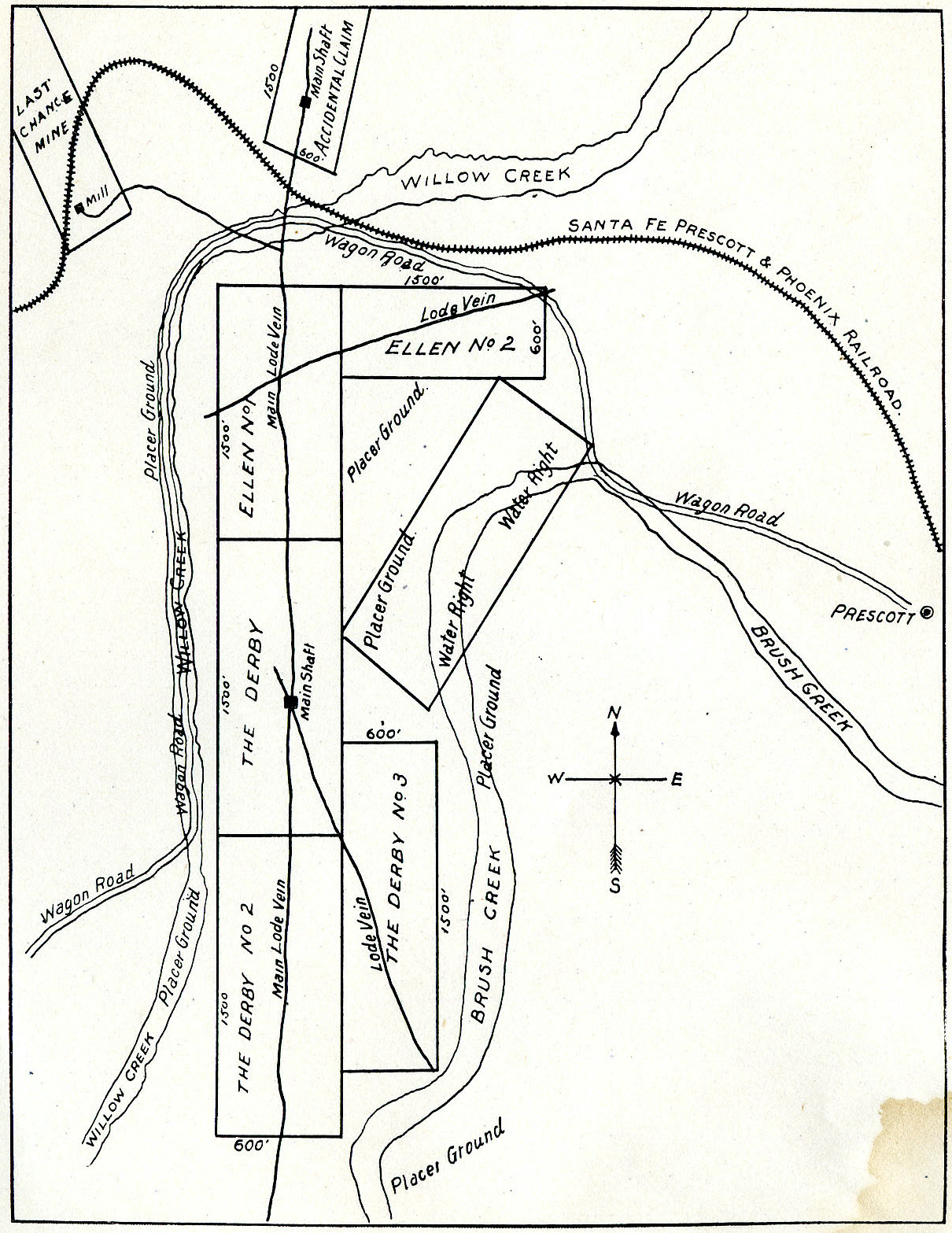
Derby, Derby No.2, Derby No. 3, Ellen No. 1, Ellen No. 2, Last Chance, Accidental Lode Claims

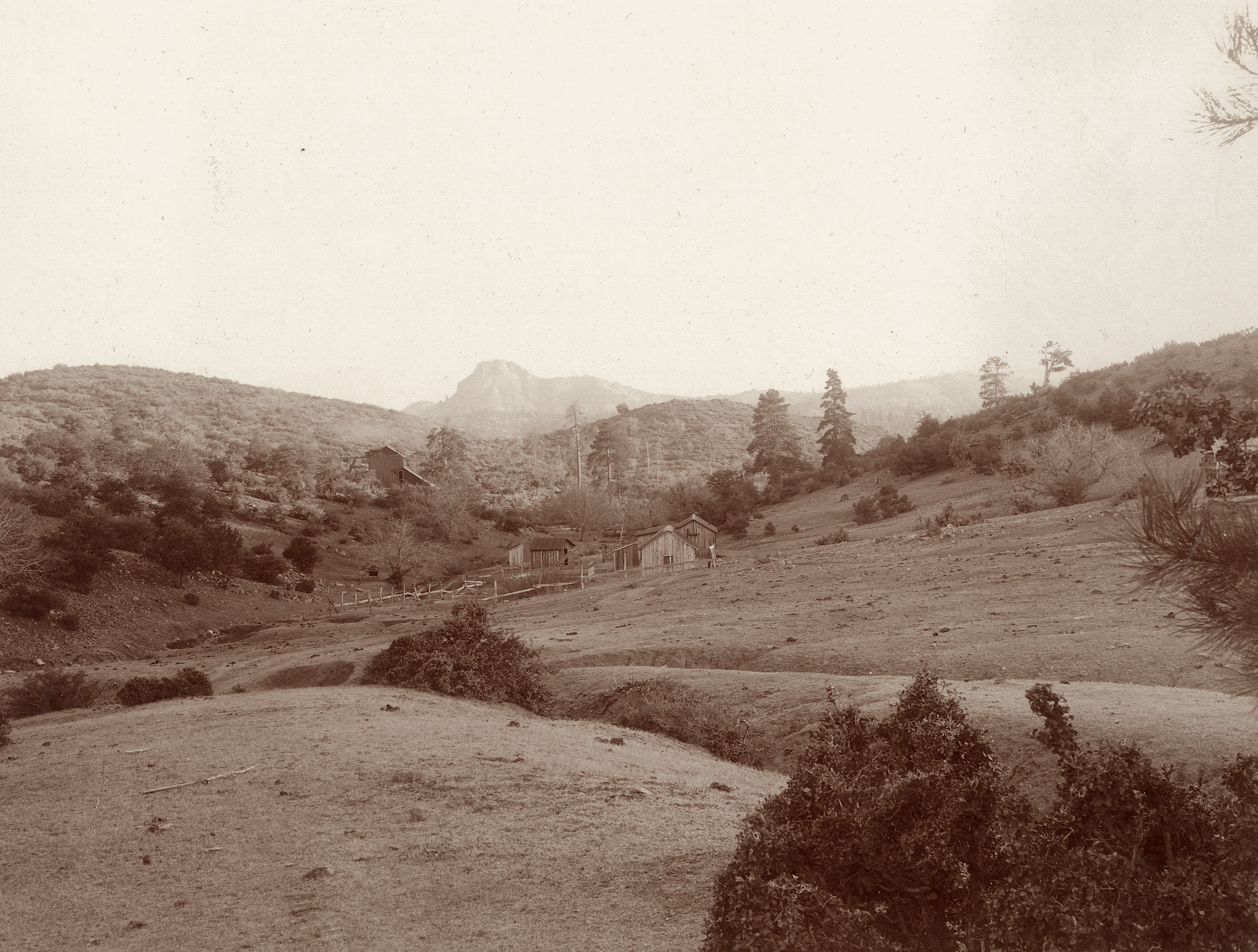
Millsite & Camp, Derby Mine, Thumb Butte Mining District

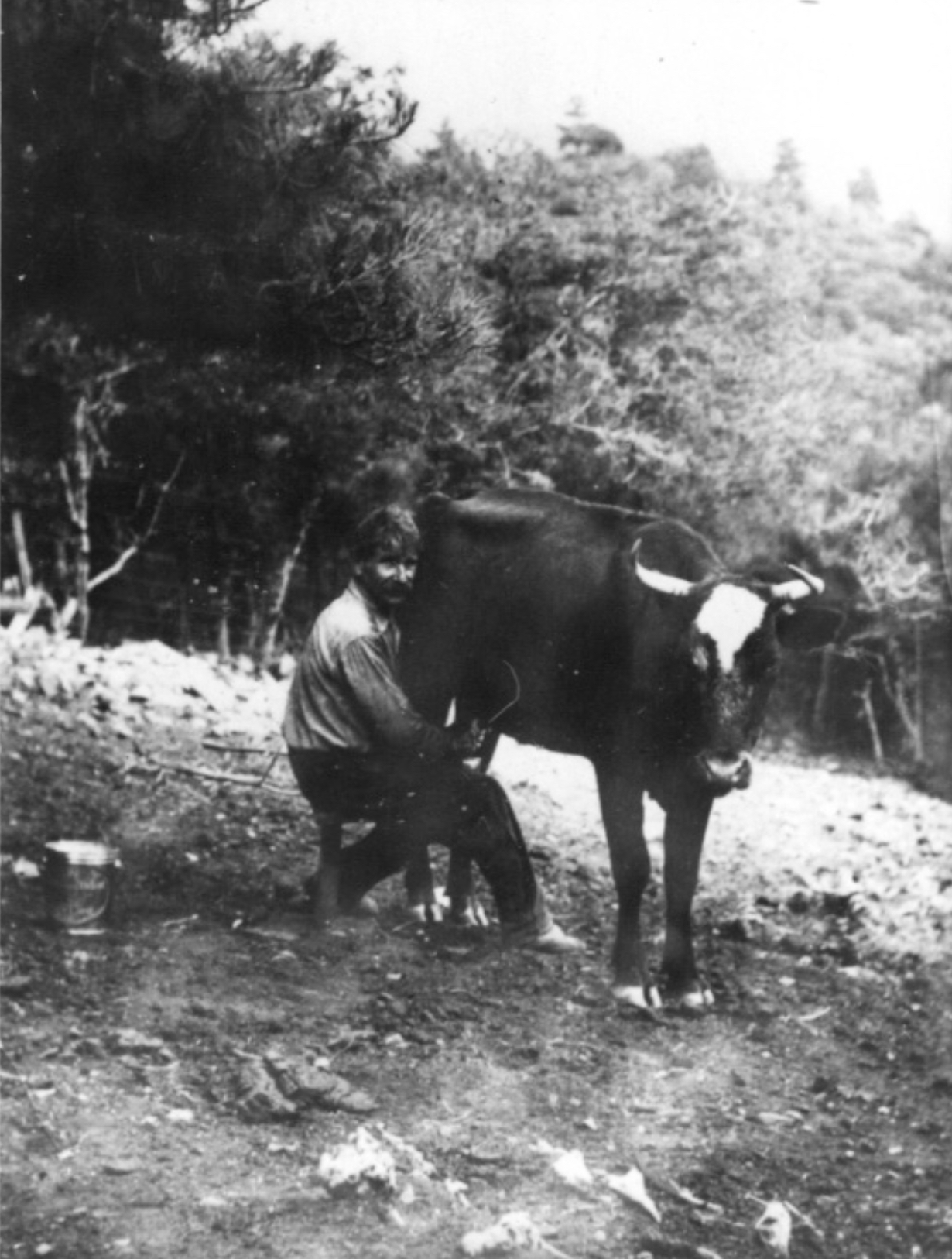
Fred J. Smith with calf at 'Derby Mine'

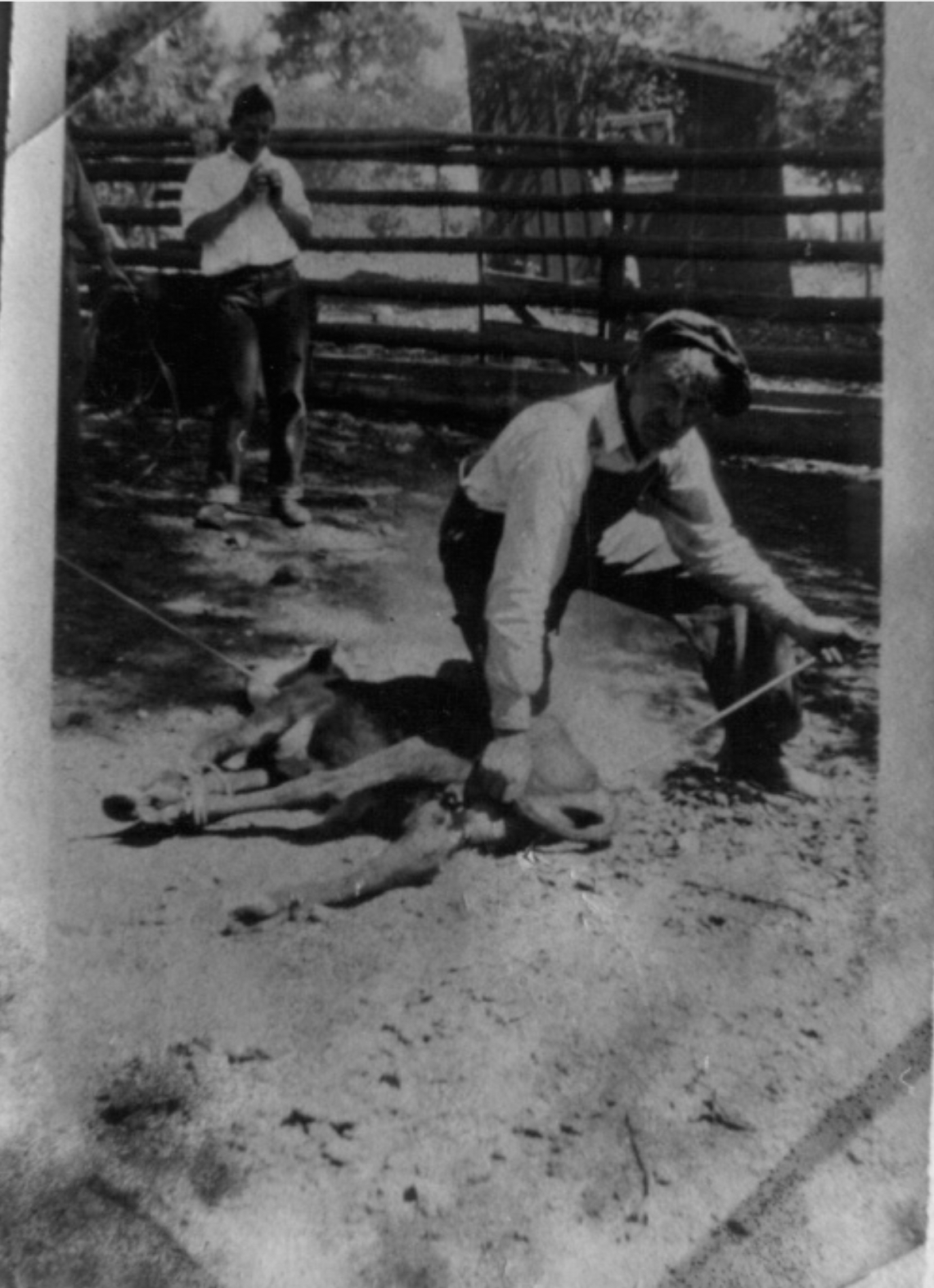
Early stock at Highland Pines

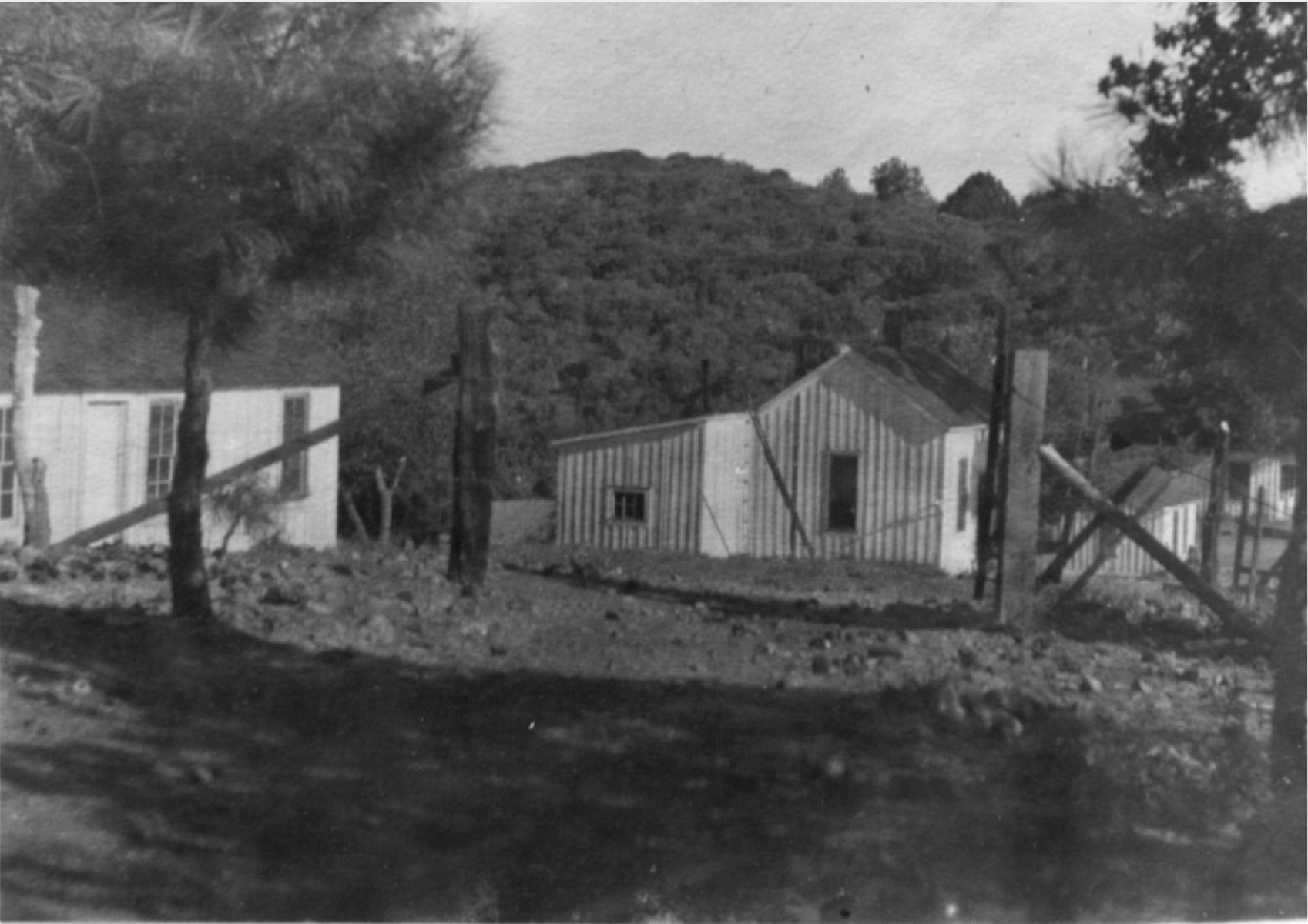
Miners Shanties, Skyline Drive (Highland Pines)

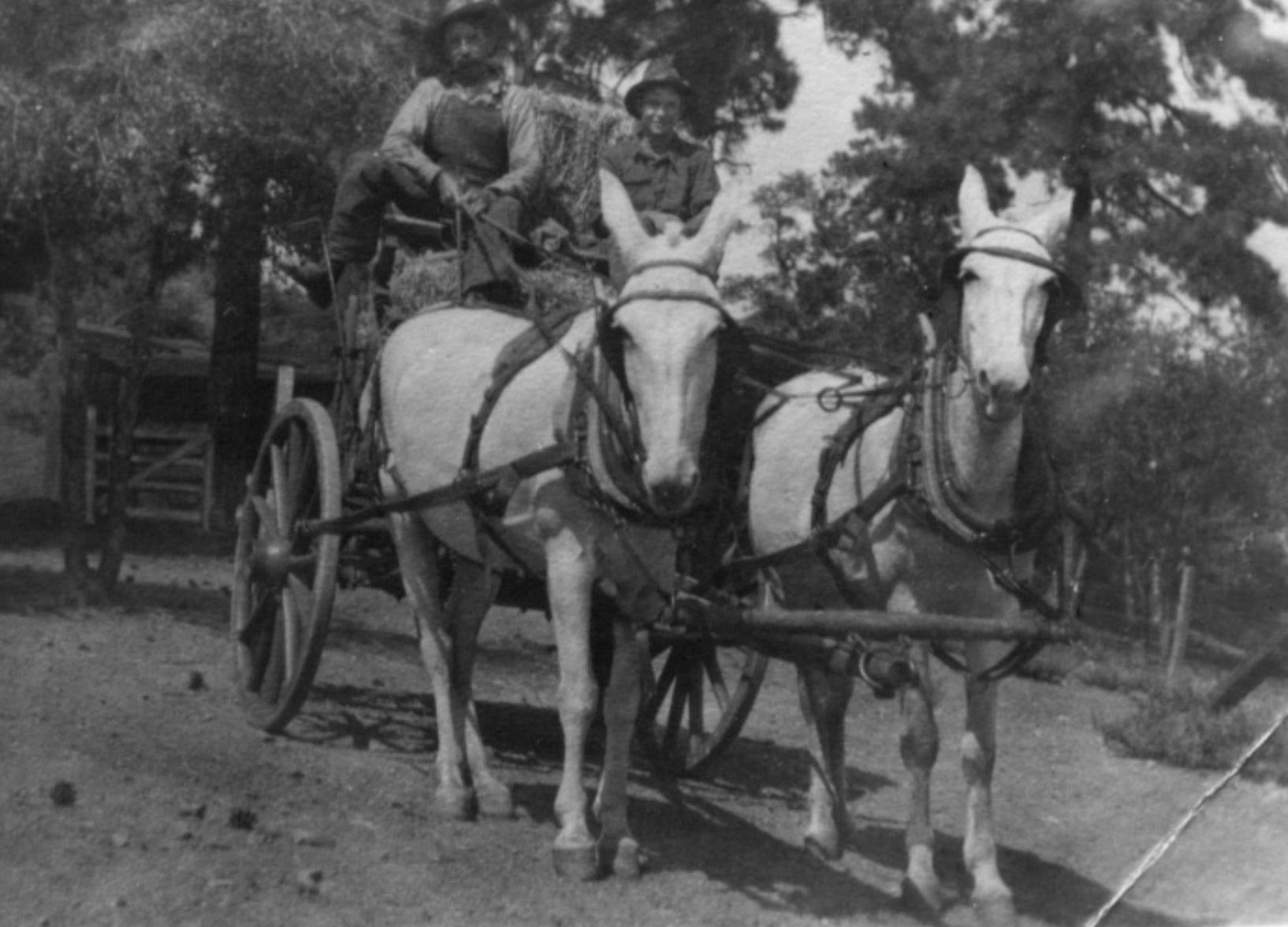
Madizelle Mining Company, Hay Bale Delivery, Highland Pines, Arizona

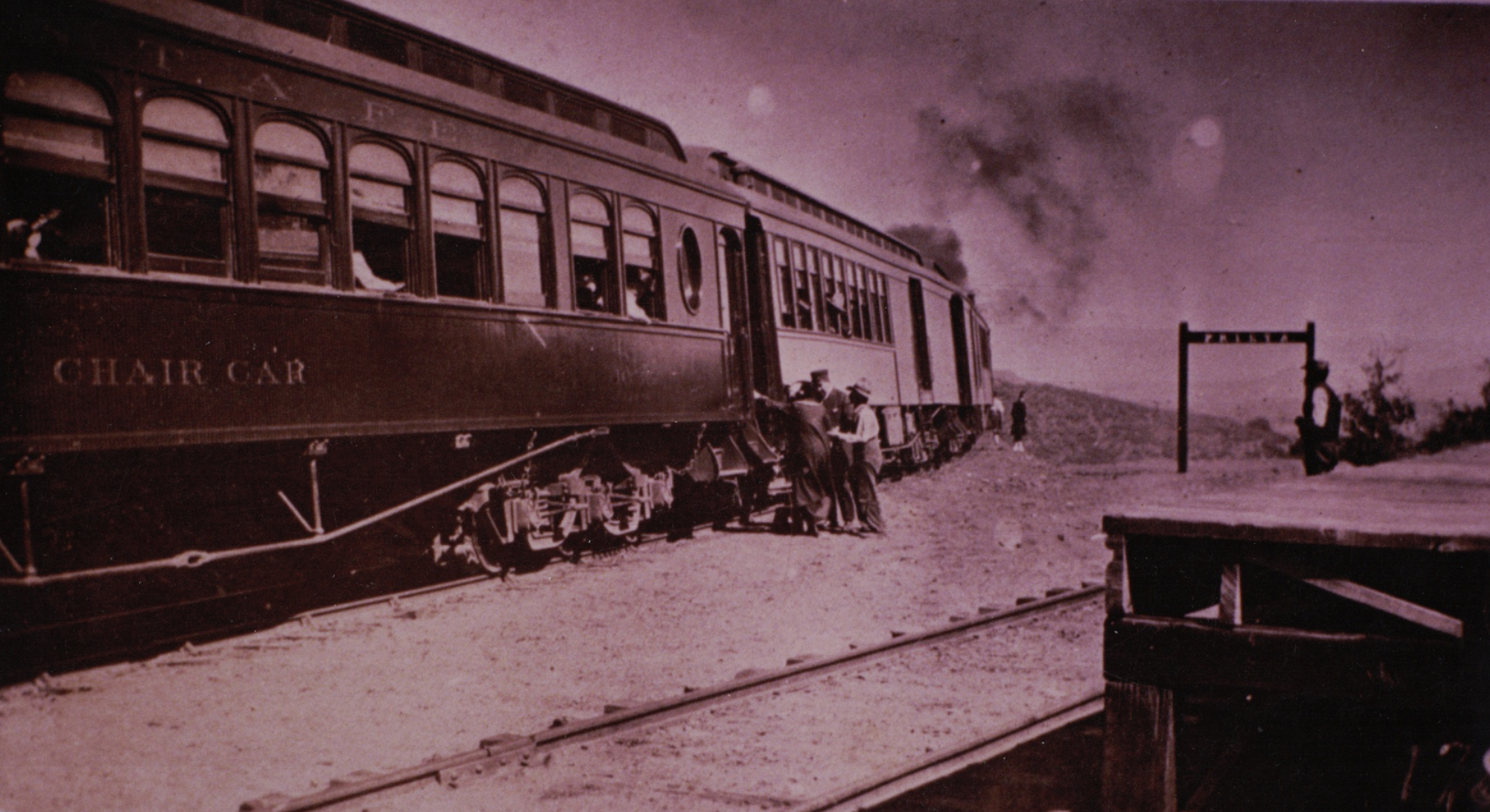
Sierra Prieta 'Summit Station' Santa Fe Prescott Phoenix Railway

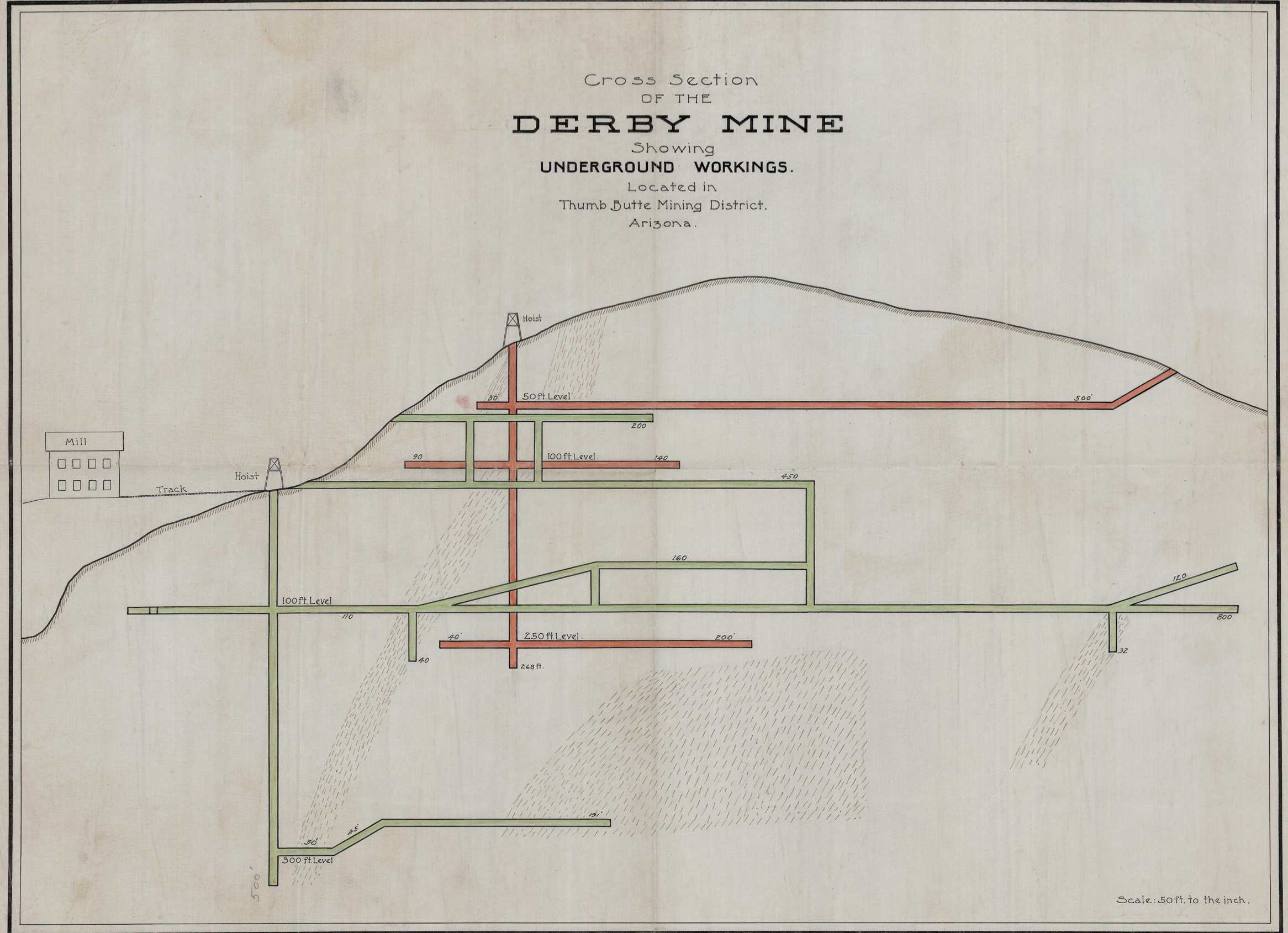
Promotional Plan of Underground Workings, Derby Mine (Prospect)

== See also ==
- Spenazuma, Arizona
- Arizona Geological Survey
- Youngberg, Arizona
- Goldfield, Arizona
- Iron Springs, Arizona
- Iron Springs Recreation Area
- Prospecting
- George U. Young
- Benson Syndicate
