= Santa Fe, Prescott and Phoenix Railway =

Former railway in Arizona

Overview
- Headquarters: Prescott, Arizona
- Locale: Central Arizona
- Dates of operation: 1891–1911

Technical
- Track gauge: 4 ft 8 1/2 in (1,435 mm) standard gauge

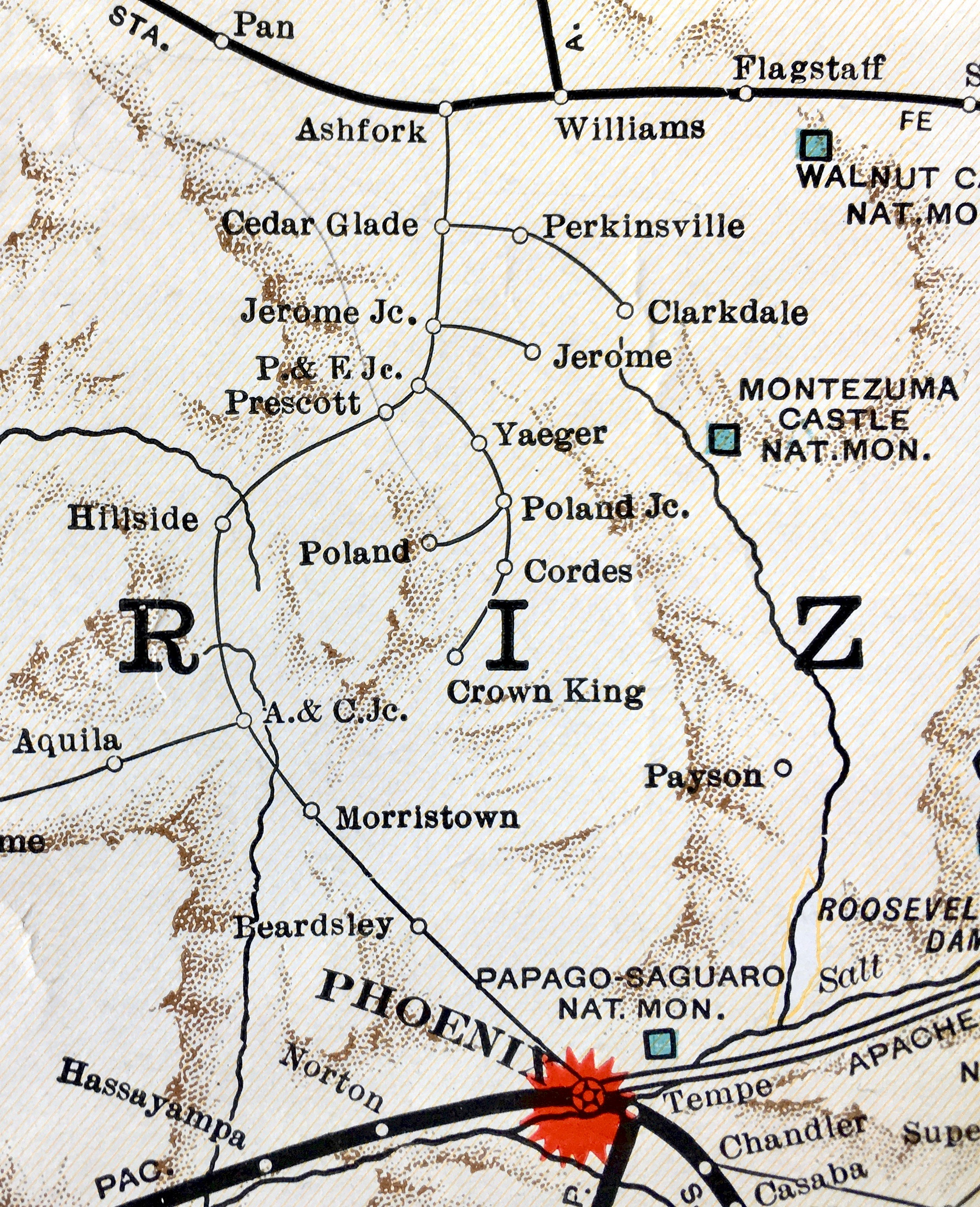
Route in 1930

The Santa Fe, Prescott and Phoenix Railway (SFP&P) was a common carrier railroad that later became an operating subsidiary of the Atchison, Topeka and Santa Fe Railway in Arizona. At Ash Fork, Arizona, the SFP&P connected with Santa Fe's operating subsidiary, the Atlantic & Pacific Railroad mainline, that ran from California to Chicago. The SFP&P's 195-mile (314 km) line extended the Santa Fe Railway south into Phoenix. The SFP&P extended another 100 miles (160 km) to the east from Phoenix to Florence and Winkelman via the Phoenix and Eastern Railroad (which would become a Southern Pacific Railroad subsidiary in 1907). The SFP&P also served several mines in the Prescott area, including the Derby Mine by way of the Summit (flag) Station at 'Prieta' in the Sierra Prieta range, through its various subsidiary railroads.

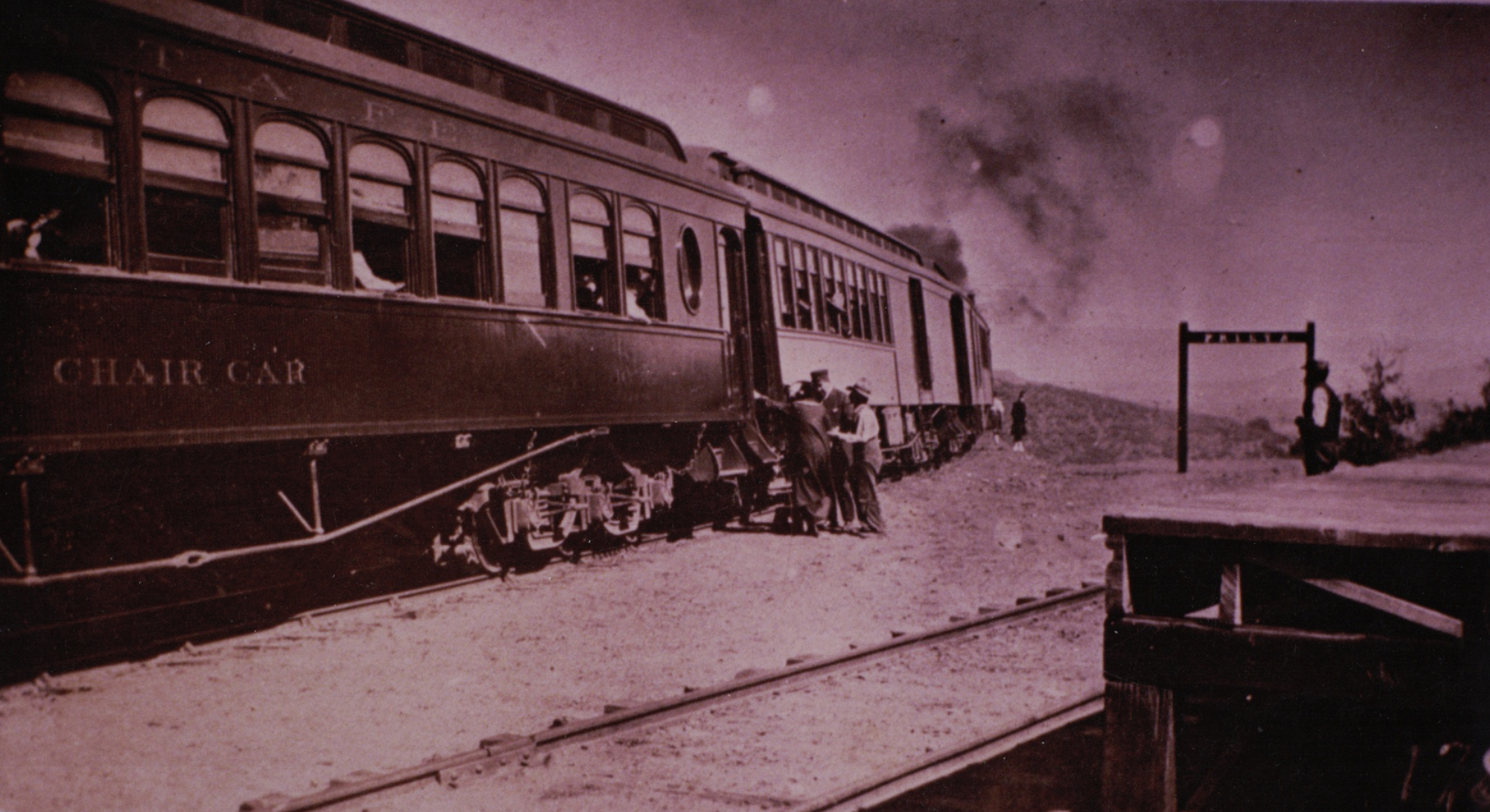
Sierra Prieta 'Summit Station' Santa Fe Prescott Phoenix Railway

On December 28, 1911, the line was merged into Atchison, Topeka and Santa Fe Railway's non-operating subsidiary (paper railroad) of the California, Arizona and Santa Fe Railway. Today the line from Ash Fork to Phoenix is operated by the BNSF Railway. Due to its many winding curves and bridges, the route was popularly known as the Peavine. In the 1960s, the AT&SF built a new line to avoid the worst grades and curves, bypassing the city of Prescott, called the New Peavine Bypass. The old route in Prescott and Chino Valley became a rail trail called the Peavine Trail.

== History ==
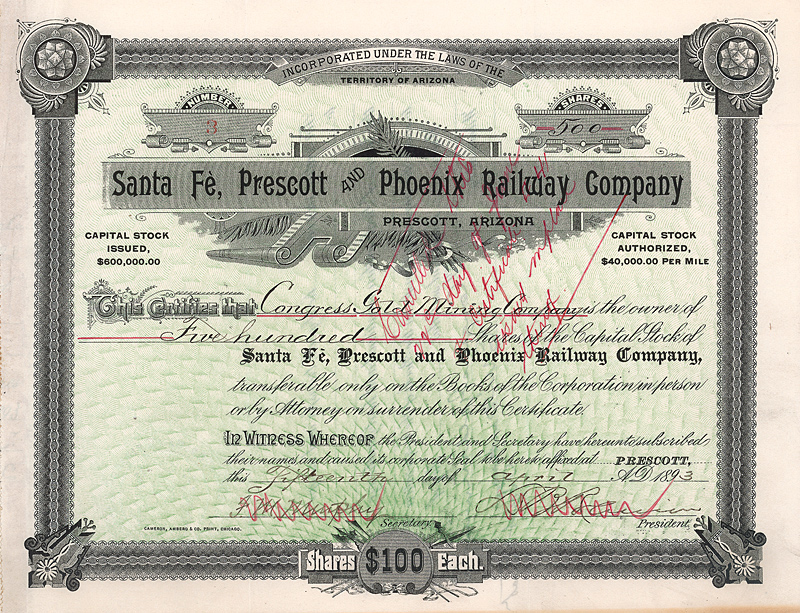
Share of the Santa Fe, Prescott & Phoenix Railway Company from the 15. April 1893

The SFP&P was chartered on May 27, 1891. Construction commenced on August 17, 1892, from the Atlantic & Pacific connection at Ash Fork. By April 1893 trains were operating between Ash Fork and Prescott. On March 13, 1895, the line ran all the way to Phoenix.

On June 30, 1899, the SFP&P began operating the Prescott and Eastern Railroad that ran between Entro (near Prescott) to Mayer. In 1901–02 the SFP&P also operated its subsidiary the Bradshaw Mountain Railroad.

On November 27, 1904, the SFP&P started operating Santa Fe Railway's subsidiary, the Phoenix and Eastern Railroad between Phoenix – Florence – Winkelman. The SFP&P stopped operating the Phoenix & Eastern when Southern Pacific Railroad acquired the Phoenix–Winkelman line on March 13, 1907.

On November 1, 1905, the SFP&P began operating the Arizona & California Railway that ran from a connection with the Santa Fe Railway in the Mojave Desert at Cadiz, California, to a connection with SFP&P at Matthie, Arizona, (located between Prescott and Wickenburg). By the end of 1909 the Arizona & California was an operating subsidiary of the SFP&P, using 3 4-6-0 locomotives made by Brooks Locomotive Works.

On December 29, 1911, the SFP&P was merged into the California, Arizona and Santa Fe Railway, a non-operating subsidiary (paper railroad) of the Santa Fe Railway.

== Motive power ==
The SFP&P operated a fleet of about 27 steam locomotives. 21 of the locomotives were Brooks Locomotive Works 4-6-0 (also known as a Chesapeake or Ten-wheeler, UIC classification 2'C) steam locomotives built between 1893 and 1903. Most of these locomotives would be renumbered ATSF #2421-2435.

The SFP&P also had six Brooks Locomotive Works 2-8-0 (also known as a Consolidation) steam locomotives built between 1904 and 1906. These locomotives would be renumbered ATSF #2439-2444.

=== Operating railroads ===
- 1897–1911 by the Santa Fe, Prescott & Phoenix Railway
- 1912– by the Atchison, Topeka & Santa Fe Railway

== Route ==
=== Mainline ===
- Ash Fork
- Paulden
- Prescott
- Alto
- Summit Station (Prieta)
- Iron Springs
- Skull Valley
- Kirkland
- Congress
- Wickenburg
- Phoenix

The original mainline ran via Prescott, the Peavine Bypass runs from Paulden to Skull Valley farther west.

=== Branches ===
- Prescott & Eastern Railroad
  - Entro – Dewey – Poland Junction – Mayer
- Bradshaw Mountain Railroad
  - Poland Junction – Poland
  - Mayer – Turkey Creek – Saddle – Crown King
- Phoenix and Eastern Railroad (1904–1907)
  - Phoenix – Mesa – Florence – Kelvin – Winkelman
- Arizona & California Railway
  - Cadiz – Parker, Arizona – Bouse – Salome – Matthie

The Arizona & California gave ATSF a more direct route from Los Angeles to Phoenix.

== See also ==
- List of defunct Arizona railroads
- Highland Park, Yavapai County, Arizona
- George U. Young
- Iron Springs, Arizona
- Iron Springs Recreation Area
- Sierra Prieta
