= Highland Park, Arizona =

Highland Park, Arizona may refer to:

- Highland Park, Cochise County, Arizona
- Highland Park, Yavapai County, Arizona
