= Iron Springs, Arizona =

Unincorporated community in the state of Arizona, United States

- Unincorporated community
- Location within the state of Arizona Iron Springs, Arizona (the United States)
- Coordinates: 34°35′05″N 112°34′12″W
- Country: United States
- State: Arizona
- County: Yavapai
- Elevation: 6,073 ft (1,851 m)
- Time zone: UTC-7 (Mountain (MST))
- ZIP codes: 86330
- GNIS feature ID: 30427

Iron Springs (also Ironsprings) is an unincorporated community in central Yavapai County, Arizona, United States, in the Prescott National Forest. It lies along Iron Springs Road northwest of the city of Prescott, the county seat of Yavapai County. Its elevation is 6,073 feet (1,851 m). Although Iron Springs is unincorporated, it has a post office, with the ZIP code of 86330.

Originally summer homes, it continues to this day as a year round retreat.

== Education ==
It is in the Prescott Unified School District, which operates Prescott High School.

== See also ==
- United States General Land Office
- Santa Fe, Prescott and Phoenix Railway
- Arizona Territory
- George U. Young
- Prescott, Arizona
- Binger Hermann
- Highland Park, Yavapai County, Arizona

== Climate ==
According to the Köppen Climate Classification system, Iron Springs has a semi-arid climate, abbreviated "BSk" on climate maps.
