= George U. Young =

American businessman, Arizona mining promoter (1867–1926)

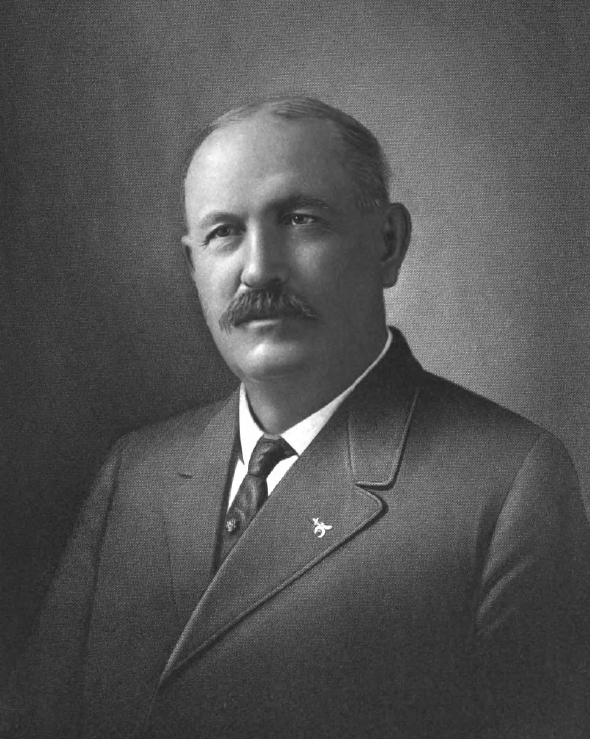

15th Secretary of Arizona Territory
- In office May 1, 1909 – February 12, 1912
- Nominated by: William Howard Taft
- Preceded by: John H. Page
- Succeeded by: Sidney P. Osborn (as the Secretary of State of Arizona)

28th Mayor of Phoenix
- In office April 7, 1914 – May 1, 1916
- Preceded by: Lloyd B. Christy
- Succeeded by: Peter Corpstein

Personal details
- Born: February 10, 1867 Hamburg, Clark County, Indiana
- Died: November 26, 1926 (aged 59) Derby Mine near Prescott, Arizona
- Party: Republican; Progressive
- Spouse: Ellen M. Smith (m. 1900)

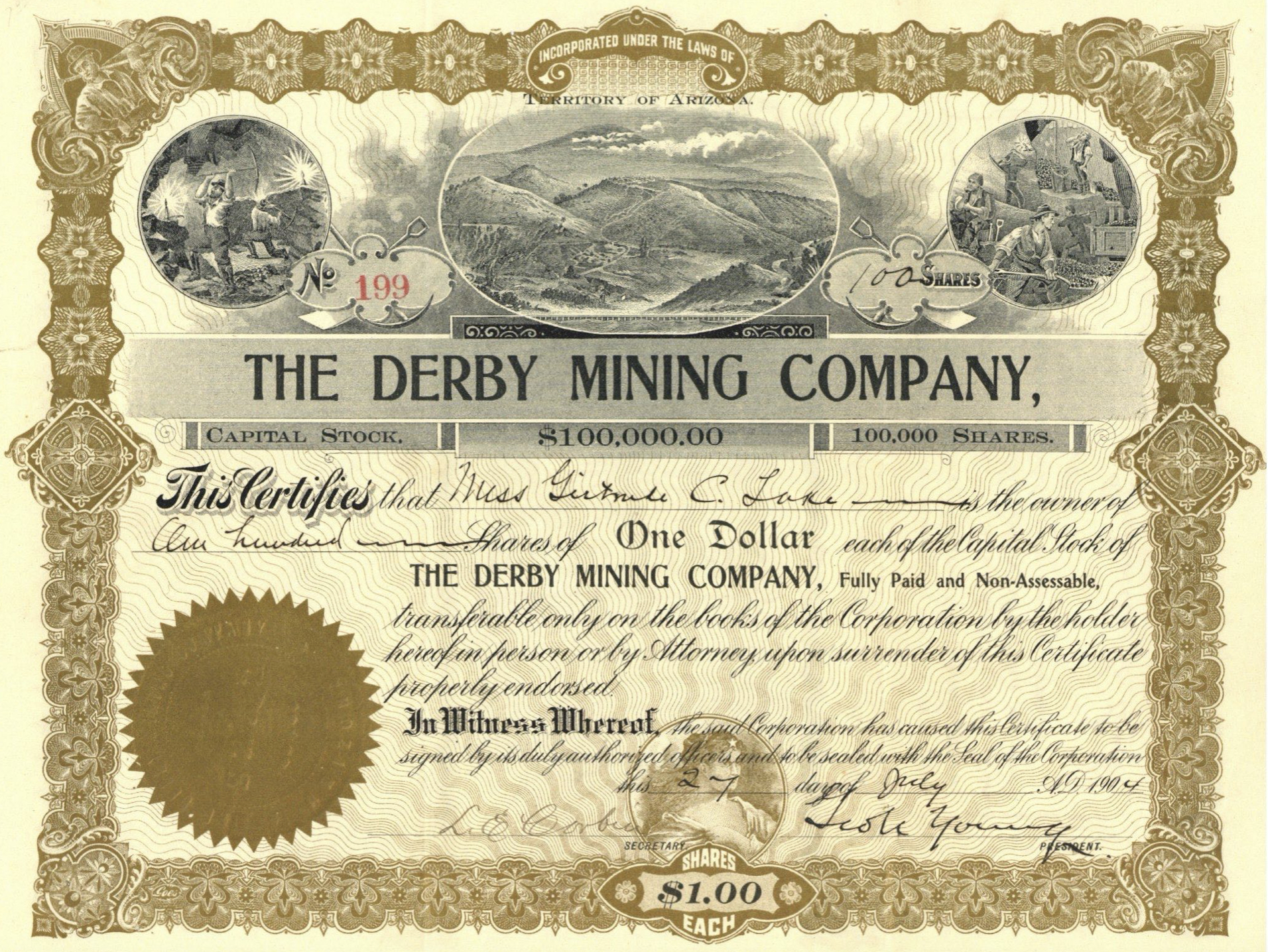
Derby Mining Company, Stock Certificate, 1904

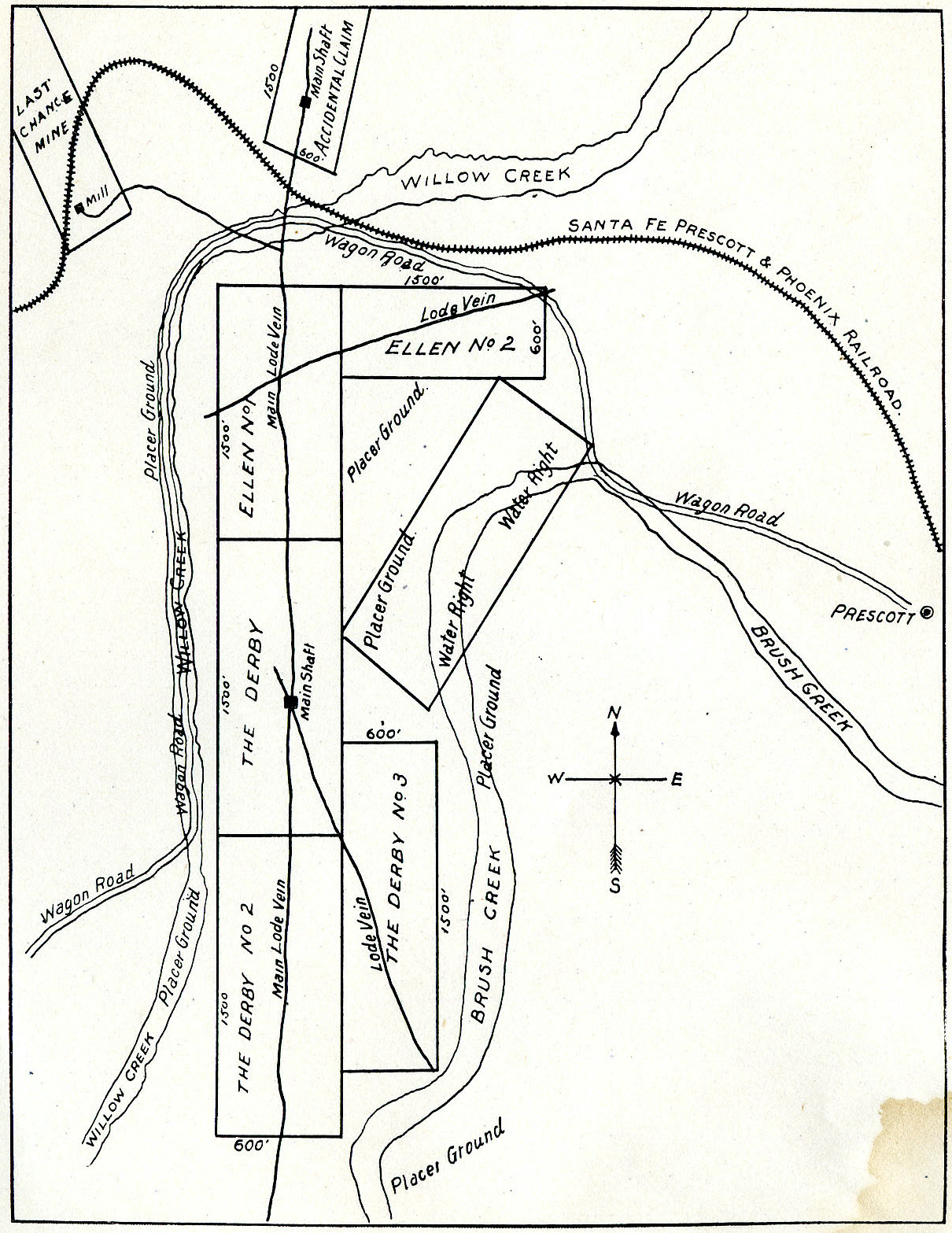
Derby, Derby No.2, Derby No. 3, Ellen No. 1, Ellen No. 2, Last Chance, Accidental Lode Claims

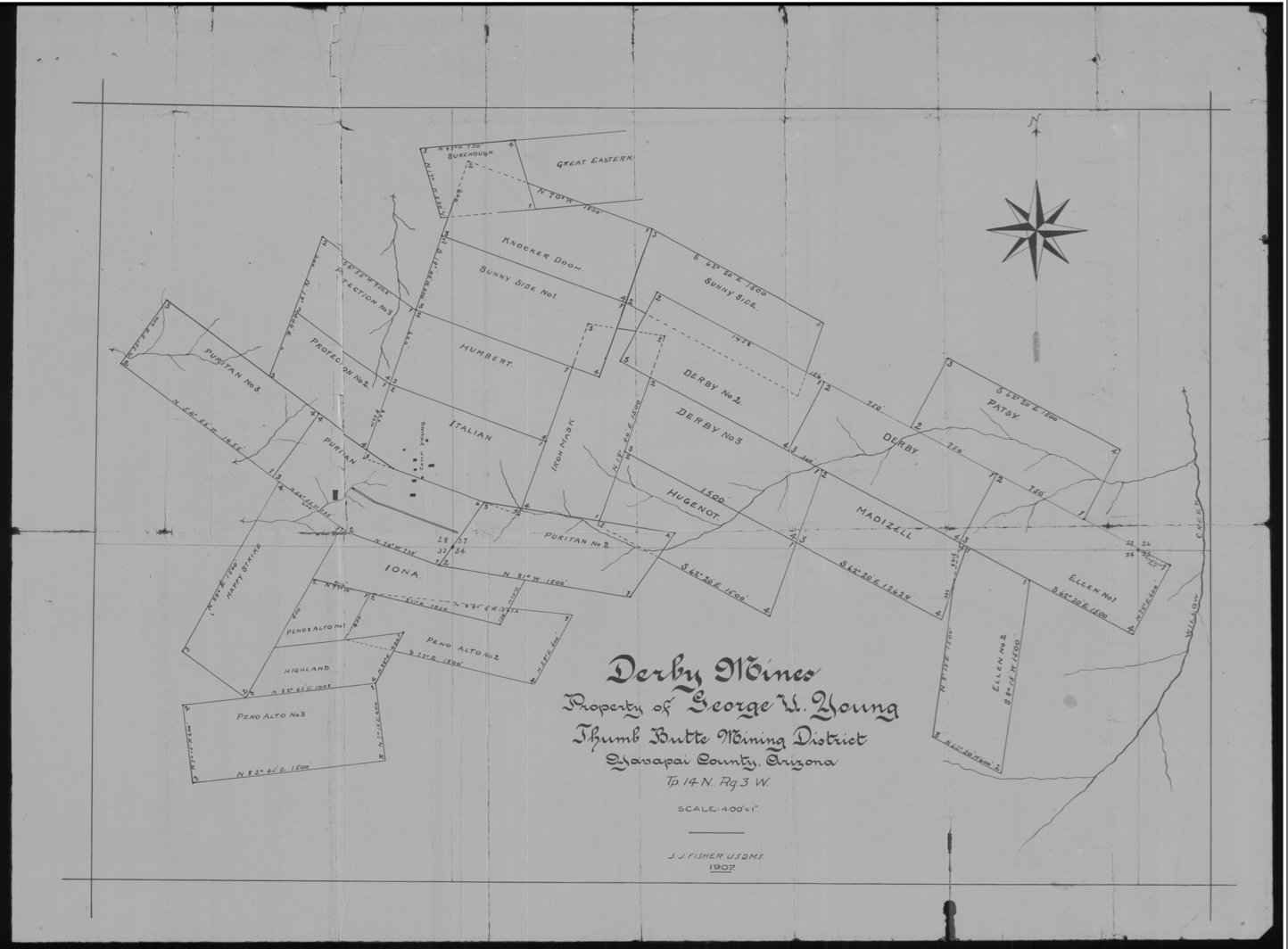
Derby Mines, Property of George U. Young, 1907

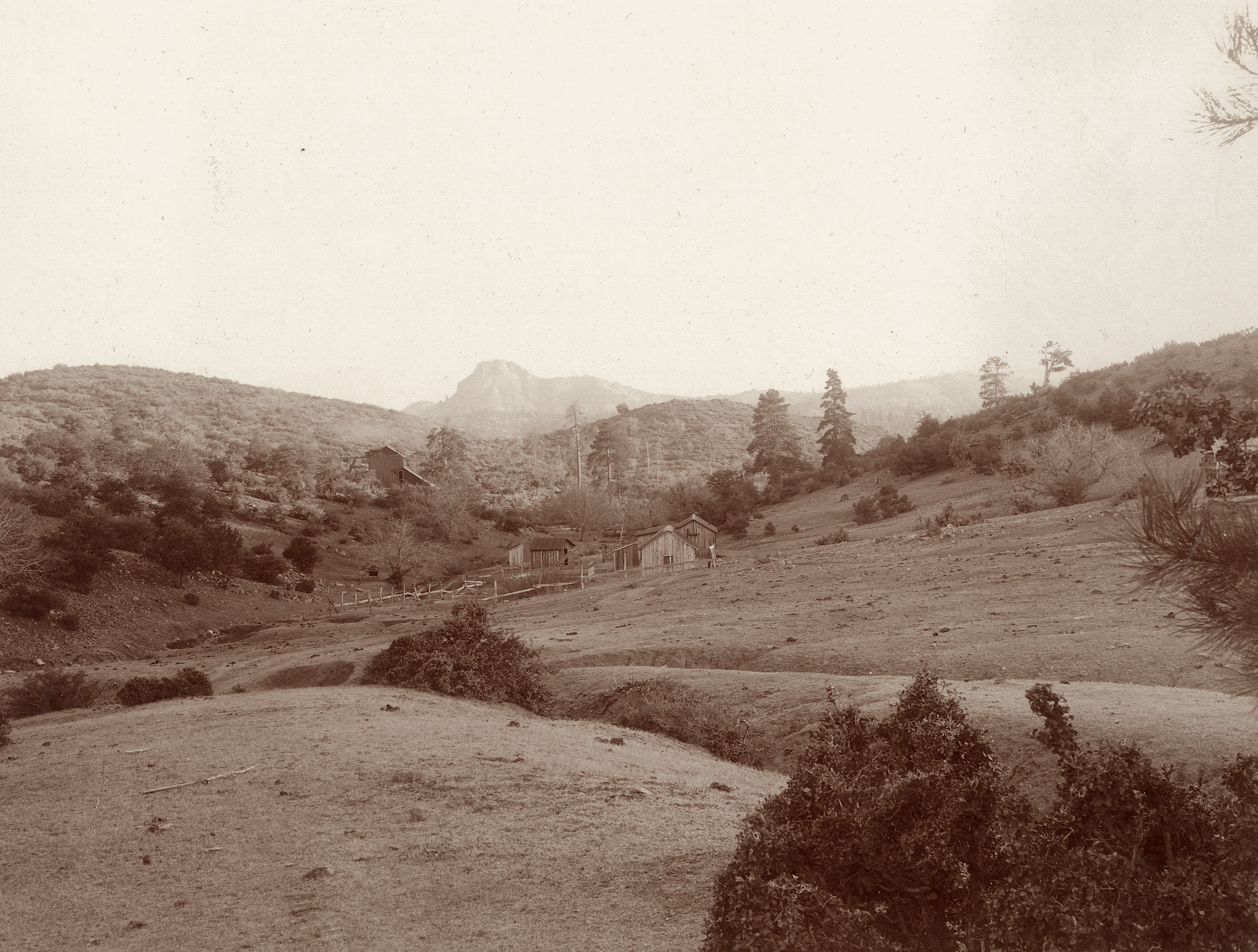
Millsite & Camp, Derby Mine, Thumb Butte Mining District

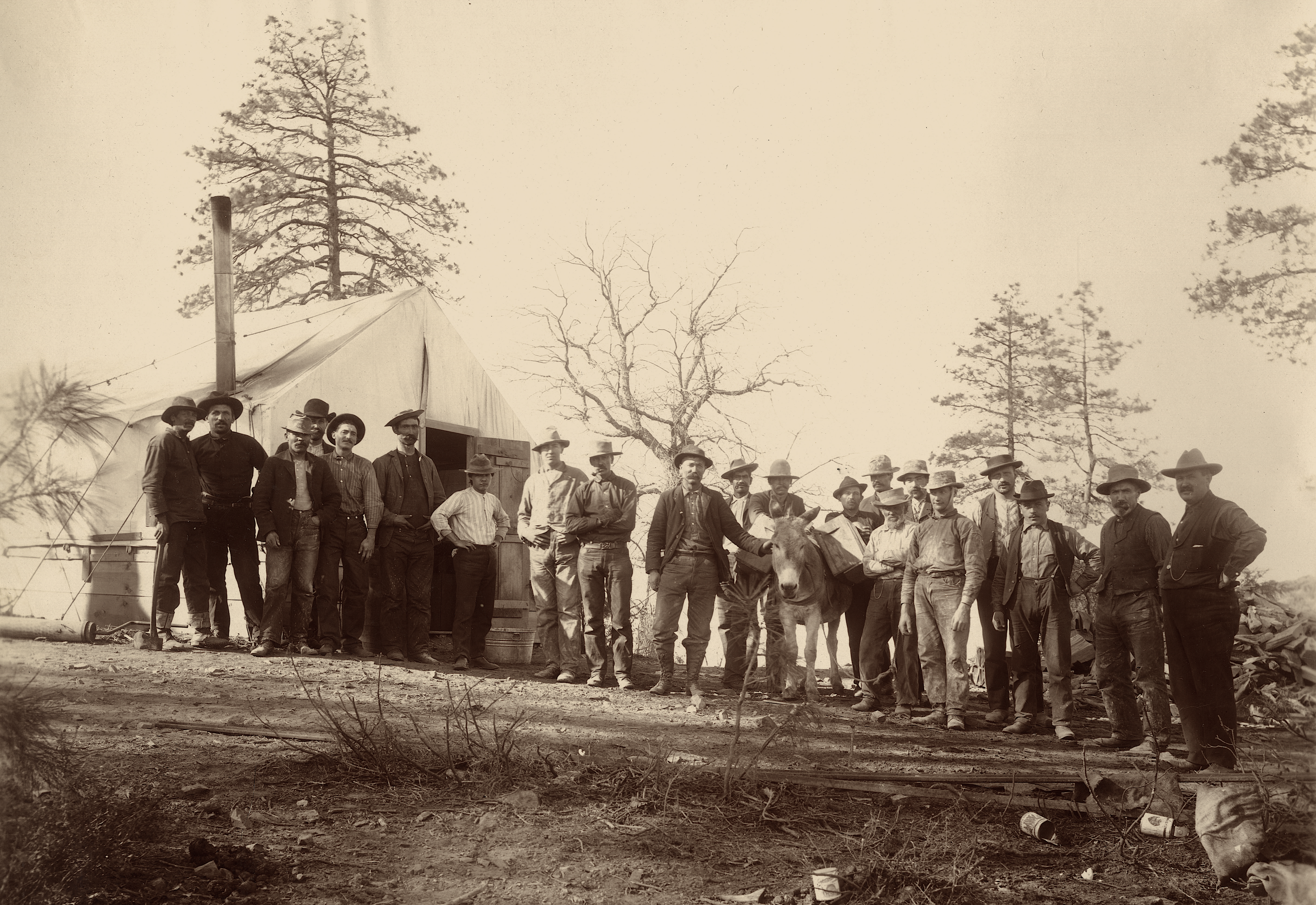
Miners in Thumb Butte Mining District

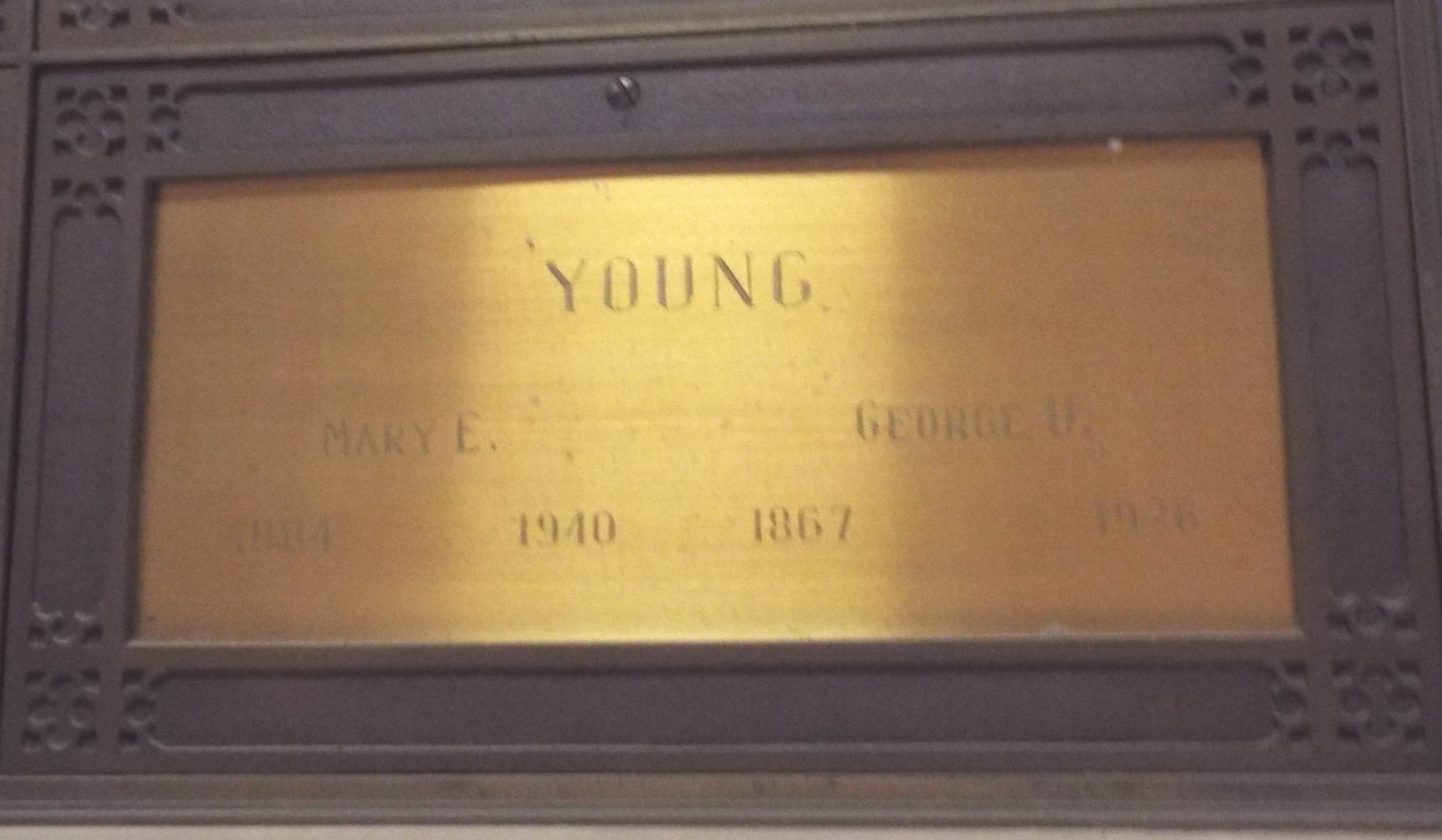
The crypt containing the cremated remains of George Ulysses Young (1867–1926) and Mary E. Young (1884–1940).

George Ulysses Young (February 10, 1867 – November 26, 1926) was an American businessman and politician. Active initially in journalism, he redirected his business interests to the expansion of railroads and the promotion of mining. Politically he served as Secretary of Arizona Territory and as Mayor of Phoenix.

== Early life ==
Born to John Alexander and Elizabeth (Wilson) Young on February 10, 1867, in Hamburg, Clark County, Indiana. (Note: Some sources list Young's mother as Mary (Wilson) Young.) While he attended public schools, he was primarily self-taught. By age 12 he was literate in both Greek and Latin. His mother died when Young was a boy and his father moved the family to Kansas in 1879. He began working at age 14, taking a job as a farm hand. A year later he was teaching at a local school. Young also began a study of law. After being admitted to the Kansas bar when he was 21, he began a successful legal practice, winning eighteen cases. Young left his legal practice in 1890 and moved to Phoenix, Arizona Territory.

== Arizona ==
In Arizona, Young became a bookkeeper for a company building a railroad line between Ashfork and Phoenix. He then worked his way up to fireman and engineer with the Atlantic & Pacific Railroad. Young was then elected principal for the schools in Williams. He remained there for four years. During this time he became the owner and publisher of the Williams News. In another business venture, Young joined with Buckey O'Neill and became an organizer and promoter for the Grand Canyon Railway. Following O'Neill's death, Young became the primary force behind the railroad's completion. The effort was financially unsuccessful and Young stated losses valued over $75,000 in the venture. Young joined an American Railway Union strike in 1904 and never returned to work for the railroads.

Young married Mary Ellen Smith of Williams on September 26, 1900. The union produced two daughters, Helen Young, later Helen Y. Brown and a son, George Young Jr.. Mary Ellen often went by the name of Ellen M. Young. George U. Young Jr. lived in Mesa, Arizona until he died in the 1970s. Fraternally, Young was a 32nd degree Mason. He was also a member of the Benevolent and Protective Order of Elks, Knights of Pythias, and the Nobles of the Mystic Shrine.

== Young Mines Company Ltd. (Goldfield, Arizona) ==
Around 1893, Young became interested in prospecting and the promotion of mining stock. In Goldfield, Arizona, later renamed Youngberg, Arizona, Young was the president and general manager of Young Mines Company, Ltd.. Young Mines Company Ltd. became the claimant of the multiple Mammoth Lode claim's, otherwise referred to as The Mammoth Mines, which are depicted on several Bureau of Land Management sheets as connected mineral surveys.

The original plats for the lode mining claims claimed by Young Mines Company, Ltd. are depicted on U.S. Mineral Surveys No. 3884, 3886 and 1130 (multiple sheets). The Plat was ultimately amended in 1961, along with the corresponding field notes. Then claim(s) were relinquished by claimant in 1967–1968. A hearing examiners order Contest No. Arizona 961, dated September 17, 1968, declared many of the claims invalid. According to the Plat and notes of record, The Mammoth, Mammoth No. 2 and Montezuma lodes, M.S. 1130 were canceled December 16, 1997 (9605), making the cancelling an official part of the field notes of survey. Mineral Survey 3884 which depicted the 'Arpad' et, al. lodes was cancelled February 3, 1999.

== Derby Mine ==
Young associated himself with the Derby Mine, which was originally located on January 1, 1900, by located by Silas P. Hill and J.C. Forrest, and the Derby Mining Company in the Thumb Butte Mining District. The promotions of the Derby Mining Company stock took place between the Copper Basin and Mint Valley Mining Districts in the Sierra Prieta Range Yavapai County west of Prescott.

There is a rich history of prospects, mining activity and the promotion of mining claims by Young. During the late 1800s and early 1900s, lode mining claims were located by prospectors who, like Young, identified these claims under both the 1866 Mining Act, and The General Mining Act of 1872. Regularly used by Young in his promotions of this popular field was his office letterhead, which read: 'Stocks, Bonds, Lands, Investments; Land and Irrigation Projects Examined; Mine Reports a Specialty.

George U. Young acted as president, general manager and lessee of the Derby Mining Company in about 1902 and vice president and power of attorney of the later Madizelle Mining Company (1908), offering capital stock in both companies. Certificates were primarily issued through brokers, to investors on the east coast. Young's cattle ranching prospects for the Derby lands were as just as much a part of the ground as his mining promotions. Both were well known throughout the Thumb Butte District, where present day Highland Park is centered.

On June 17, 1907, the U.S. Surveyor General for Arizona issued official survey instructions[2] for mineral survey twenty four-twenty four to J.J. Fisher, a U.S. Deputy Mineral Surveyor. This effort resulted in the 'Plat of the (Mining) Claim of George U. Young, which was incorporated into land patent documents to the Madizelle Mining Company.[3] Official records indicate the mineral plat represents twenty five lode mining claims situated in the Thumb Butte Mining District: Puritan, Puritan No. 2, Puritan No. 3, Iron Mask, Derby, Derby No. 2, Derby No. 3, Ellen No. 1, Ellen No. 2, Madizelle, Huguenot, Patsy, Humbert, Italian, Happy Strike, Sunny Side No. 1, Sunny Side, Surenough, Penos Alto No. 1, Penos Alto No. 2, Penos Alto no. 3, Highland, Knocker Doom, Protection No.2 and Protection #3.

George U. Young filed many types of lode mining claim location notices for claims throughout the Thumb Butte Mining District. One of his first mineral discoveries was aptly named the Accidental. George U. Young was a well known promoter in the Territory, publicly promoting himself, as well as his related mining ventures since the 1890s. In 1912, Geo. U. Young sat as a director on the Phoenix Real Estate Board, which like the Madizelle Mining Company, also operated from the building block at 403-404 Fleming in downtown Phoenix, present site of the Wells Fargo tower. Regularly used by Young was his office letterhead, which read: 'Stocks, Bonds, Lands, Investments; Land and Irrigation Projects Examined; Mine Reports a Specialty.' Young's mining ventures were well known throughout the Thumb Butte District, where present day Highland Park is centered.

The primary foundation of present-day Highland Pines, is U.S. Mineral Survey 2424 the 'Plat of the (Mining) Claim of George U. Young, which was incorporated into land patent documents, to the later Madizelle Mining Co., George U. Young acting as power of attorney for the company.

Young is also associated with several other lode mining claim location notices, for claims throughout the Highland Park area. One of his first locations is known as the 'Accidental' Lode Mining Claim. Additional lode mining claims situated in the Thumb Butte Mining District are the Isabella, Big Ben No. 1, Big Ben No. 2, Ellen M., Iona, Great Eastern, Last Chance (J.J. Fisher), Star, Lowry Hill, Lowry Cross, Ohio, Norman, Summit, Edgar, Alto, and Protection. Prominent locators working with Young in the early 1900s included Thomas Smith, Frank Polson, Thomas C. Hill, Silas 'S.P.' Hill, James R. Lowry, James Samuels, Norman Hale, and Joseph Dougherty. The mining efforts here were all greatly served by the simple flag station with one switch, known by local miners as Summit Station, otherwise known as Sierra Prieta on the Santa Fe, Prescott and Phoenix Railway. This was the main delivery system for the hauling of heavy equipment to the mining activity in the area.

== Politics ==
Politically, Young was secretary of the Republican territorial committee in 1908. On April 8, 1909, President William Howard Taft nominated him to become territorial secretary. Young took his oath of office on May 1 and he held the office until Arizona achieved statehood on February 14, 1912. While in office, Young's primary concern was dealing with Arizona's 1910 constitutional convention. To aid in the efforts, Phoenix's first post office substation was opened adjacent to Young's office on January 2, 1911. The substation dealt almost exclusively with mail related to Arizona's proposed constitution. In 1912, Geo. U. Young sat as a director on the Phoenix Real Estate Board, which also operated from the building block at 403-404 Fleming in downtown Phoenix, present site of the Wells Fargo tower.

On several occasions, Young served as acting governor. In July 1911, he granted clemency to several prisoners. This action angered Governor Richard Elihu Sloan, who was vacationing in California at the time. Sloan commented on the issue, saying "This is one reason why I spend so much time at home, I am almost afraid to get out of the territory for this sort of things has happened before." During his final months in office, Young oversaw the sale of office furniture belonging to the federal government.

With statehood coming, Young was a Republican candidate for governor in 1911, but lost in the primary to Edmund W. Wells. He was elected Mayor of Phoenix and sworn in on April 7, 1914. The same year he was the Progressive party candidate for governor. He did fairly well for a third-party candidate, garnering over 10% of the vote, but lost to incumbent Democrat George W. P. Hunt and Republican nominee Ralph Cameron/ Young ran for reelection as mayor in 1916 but was defeated. He made another unsuccessful run for mayor in 1920. During the 1924 United States Presidential Election, Young was a Robert M. La Follette supporter.

== 1920-1926 ==
After a mining accident at his Goldfield mining operation, Young experienced a severe decline in his health, starting from about 1920 on, and in late 1925 he was rendered an invalid. He died from apparent apoplexy on November 26, 1926, at his vacation home near the Derby Mine. He was cremated and his remains interred at Phoenix's Greenwood/Memory Lawn Mortuary & Cemetery.
