= Spenazuma, Arizona =

Ghost town in Graham County, Arizona

- Ghost town
- Location within Arizona Location within the United States
- Coordinates: 32°57′17″N 110°11′44″W
- Country: United States
- State: Arizona
- County: Graham
- Founded: 1898
- Abandoned: 1899
- Time zone: UTC-7 (MST (no DST))

Spenazuma was a short-lived mining town, now a ghost town, in Graham County, Arizona, United States. The townsite is now privately owned, and the site of a working ranch.

== History ==
The town of Spenazuma was part of an elaborate swindle by an east coast con man, Richard C. Flower, to sell shares in the Spenazuma Mining Company. In 1898, Flower bought some nearby mining claims, laid out the townsite of Spenazuma, and sold shares in eastern states on the pretense that the Spenazuma Mining Company owned gold mines of immense value. Several trainloads of eastern investors were brought to Spenazuma to sustain the illusion.

It is unclear how large the mining town was during its brief life, although friendly newspaper accounts credit it with several stores and businesses, and regular stagecoach service to the railroad station at Geronimo, Arizona.

The swindle collapsed after an investigation by Arizona Republican reporter George Smalley in 1899. The town was quickly deserted. Flower ostensibly dropped out of the company management, although the remaining management immediately started another mining swindle at Aura, Arizona, now also a ghost town.

== Geography ==
The townsite is at 32°57′17″N 110°11′44″W, at an elevation of 3840 feet above sea level.
