= Sierra Prieta =

Landform in Yavapai County, Arizona

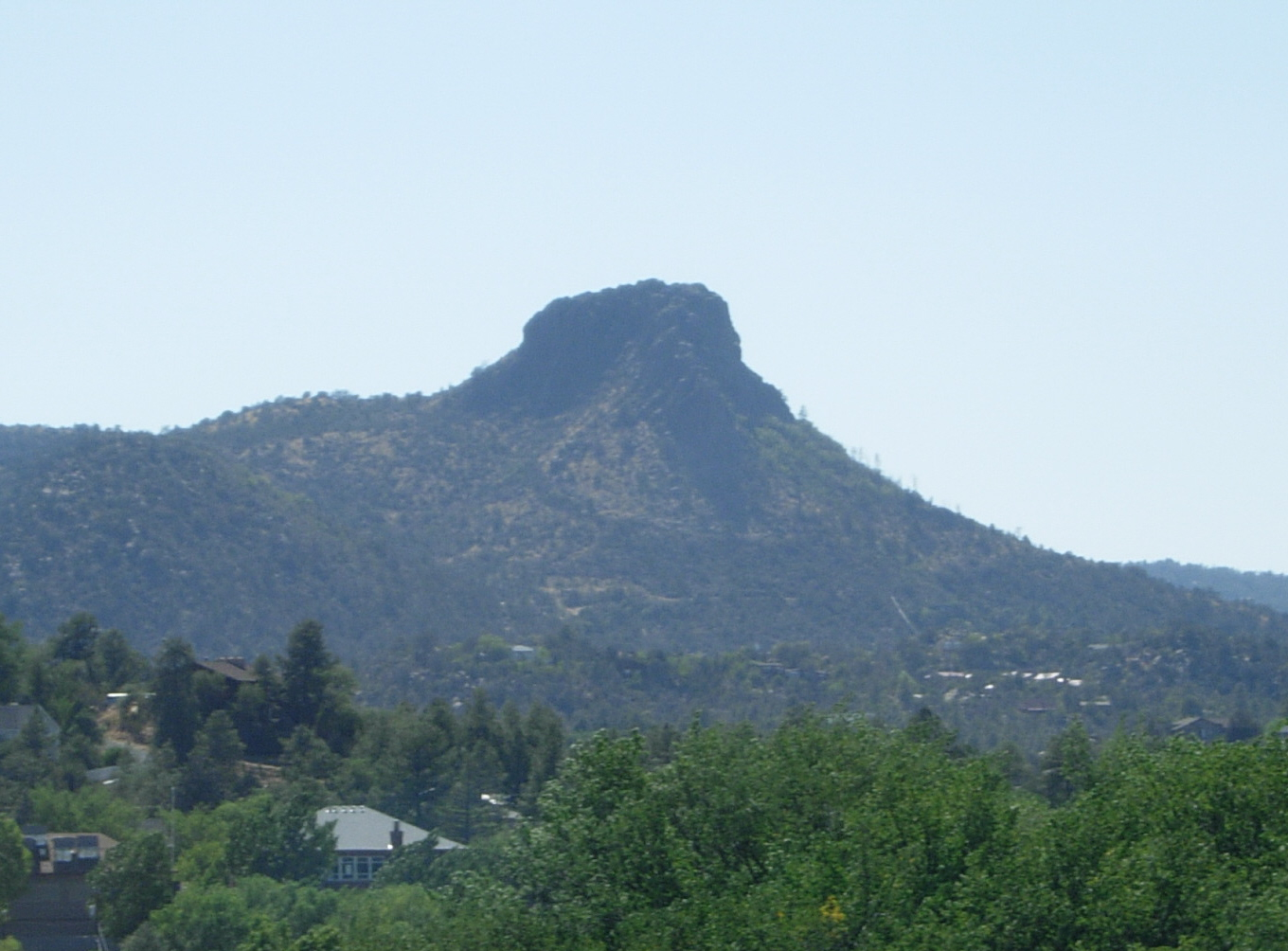
- Thumb Butte, at Prescott's west side

Highest point
- Peak: Granite Mountain
- Elevation: 7,626 ft (2,324 m)
- Coordinates: 34°38′26″N 112°34′35″W

Dimensions
- Length: 16 mi (26 km) NW-SE

Geography
- Location within Arizona
- Country: United States
- State: Arizona
- Region: Arizona transition zone
- County: Yavapai
- Communities: Prescott, Skull Valley, Iron Springs, Highland Pines and Williamson Valley
- Range coordinates: 34°32′17″N 112°35′24″W
- Borders on: Skull Valley, Santa Maria Mountains, Chino Valley, Williamson Valley, Lonesome Valley, Prescott, Arizona, Bradshaw Mountains and Weaver Mountains

The Sierra Prieta is a 14 miles (23 km) long mountain range in central-northwest Arizona. The range is the mountainous region west of Prescott, with prominent Thumb Butte, 6,514 feet (1,985 m), a volcanic plug, on the city's west perimeter.

The range is attached to the northwest of the Bradshaw Mountains, and Granite Mountain, a recreation site, as well as a rockclimbing location, is part of the range's northeast section, overlooking Williamson Valley, further northeast.

The Sierra Prieta range is adjacent the northwest perimeter of the Arizona transition zone, mostly known by its perimeter Mogollon Rim.

== Description ==
Sierra Prieta is a mostly northwest by southeast section of mountains. The highest peak in the south is Mount Francis, 7,110 feet (2,167 m), which borders the Bradshaw Mountains; Arizona State Route 89 traverses between the two mountain ranges.

The range highpoint is Granite Mountain, 7,626 feet (2,324 m), anchoring the range's N & NNE; it is separated from the central section by Little Granite Mountain, 7,082 feet (2,159 m) to the southwest, and by Tonto Mountain, 5,631 feet (1,716 m), which is due west. Two other peaks form the range's center, West Spruce Mountain, 7,160 feet (2,182 m), and Williams Peak, 7,055 feet (2,150 m).

=== Routes ===
Besides Arizona 89 going southwest from Prescott between the Bradshaw Mountains, County 10 rises to Iron Springs, (Iron Springs Pass) in the range's north. It is often used as a shorter route through the lower elevation Skull Valley during winter snowstorms.

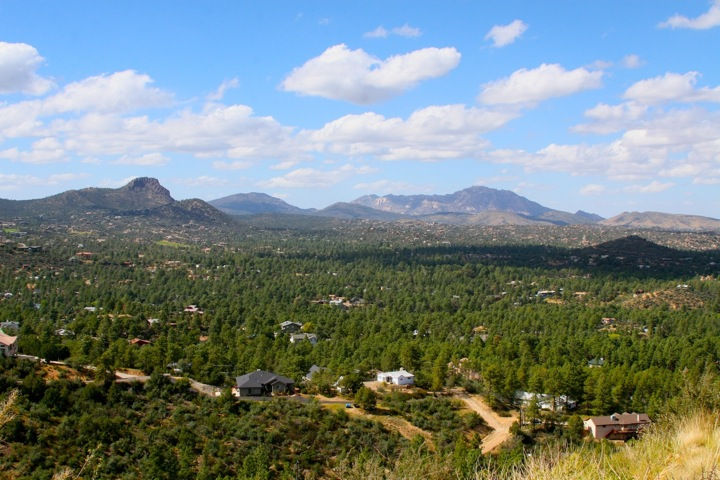
Northerly view of Thumb Butte, Granite Mountain massif, and S & W Prescott.
(The Sierra Prieta is to the photo-left.)

=== Notable ===
The Sierra Prieta range is known in cowboy camps around the world as "The Sierry Petes" a colloquial and period pronunciation of the name made famous in the cowboy poem by the same name but more widely known as "Tyin' A Knot In The Devil's Tail" by Arizonan, Gail Gardner.
