= Iron Springs Recreation Area =

- Iron Springs Shelter No. 1
- U.S. National Register of Historic Places
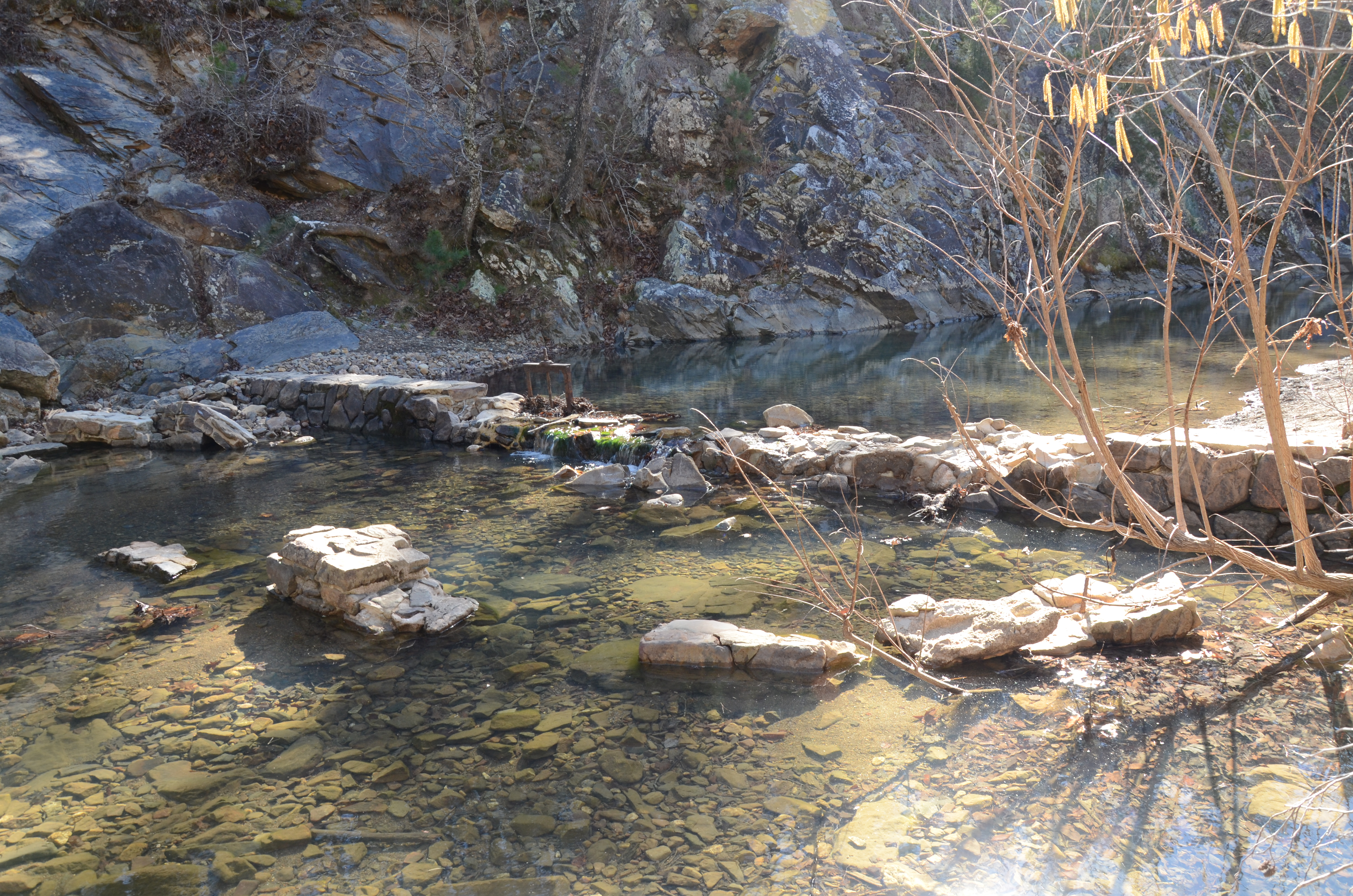

- Location within Arkansas Location within the United States
- Nearest city: Jessieville, Arkansas
- Coordinates: 34°45′41″N 93°4′9″W
- Area: less than one acre
- Built: 1933
- Built by: Civilian Conservation Corps
- Architectural style: Rustic
- MPS: Facilities Constructed by the CCC in Arkansas MPS
- NRHP reference No.: 93001091
- Added to NRHP: October 20, 1993

The Iron Springs Recreation Area is a roadside picnic area on Arkansas Highway 7, north of Jessieville in the Ouachita National Forest. The area has three shelters for picnicking, vault toilets, and an accessible trail for viewing the springs in the area. The facilities were largely built by the Civilian Conservation Corps (CCC) in the 1930s, with two shelters and the nearby dam listed on the National Register of Historic Places.

== Setting and history ==
The Iron Springs picnic area is set on the west side of Arkansas Highway 7, about 4.5 miles (7.2 km) north of Jessieville, between the road and the Middle Fork Saline River. The river is impounded by a low fieldstone dam, built by the CCC in 1933, which features alternating chutes and steps, and impounds enough water to form a modest swimming hole.

The picnic area includes three covered shelters, two of which were built by the CCC in 1933. The first is about 24 by 14 feet (7.3 m × 4.3 m), built with open log construction and topped by a gable roof. The north and south sides of the shelter have log balustrades, while the other two sides are open; a picnic table is set under the shelter. The second is more square in shape, with a pyramidal roof, but also has balustrades on the north and south sides.

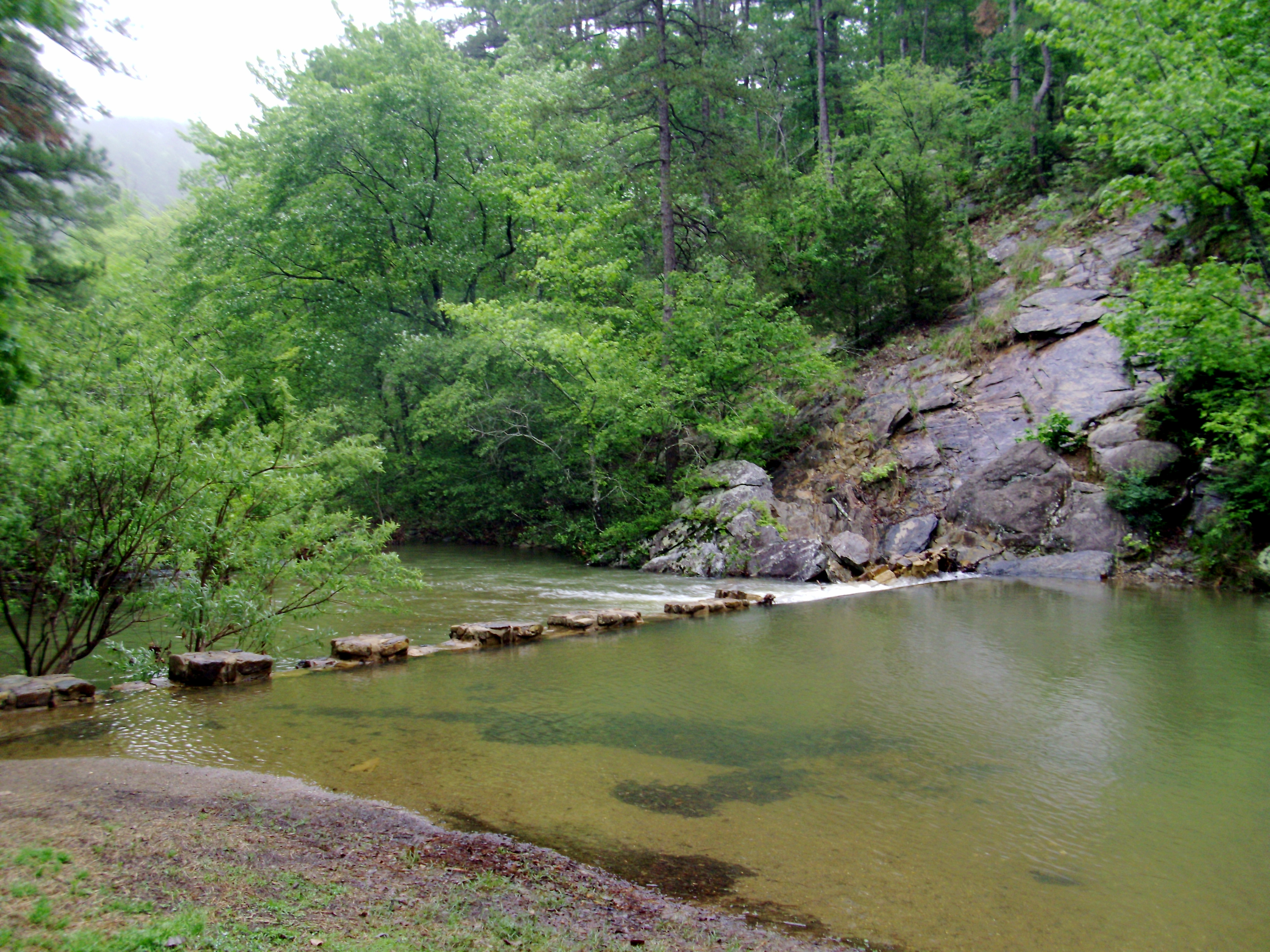
CCC dam at Iron Springs, 2014

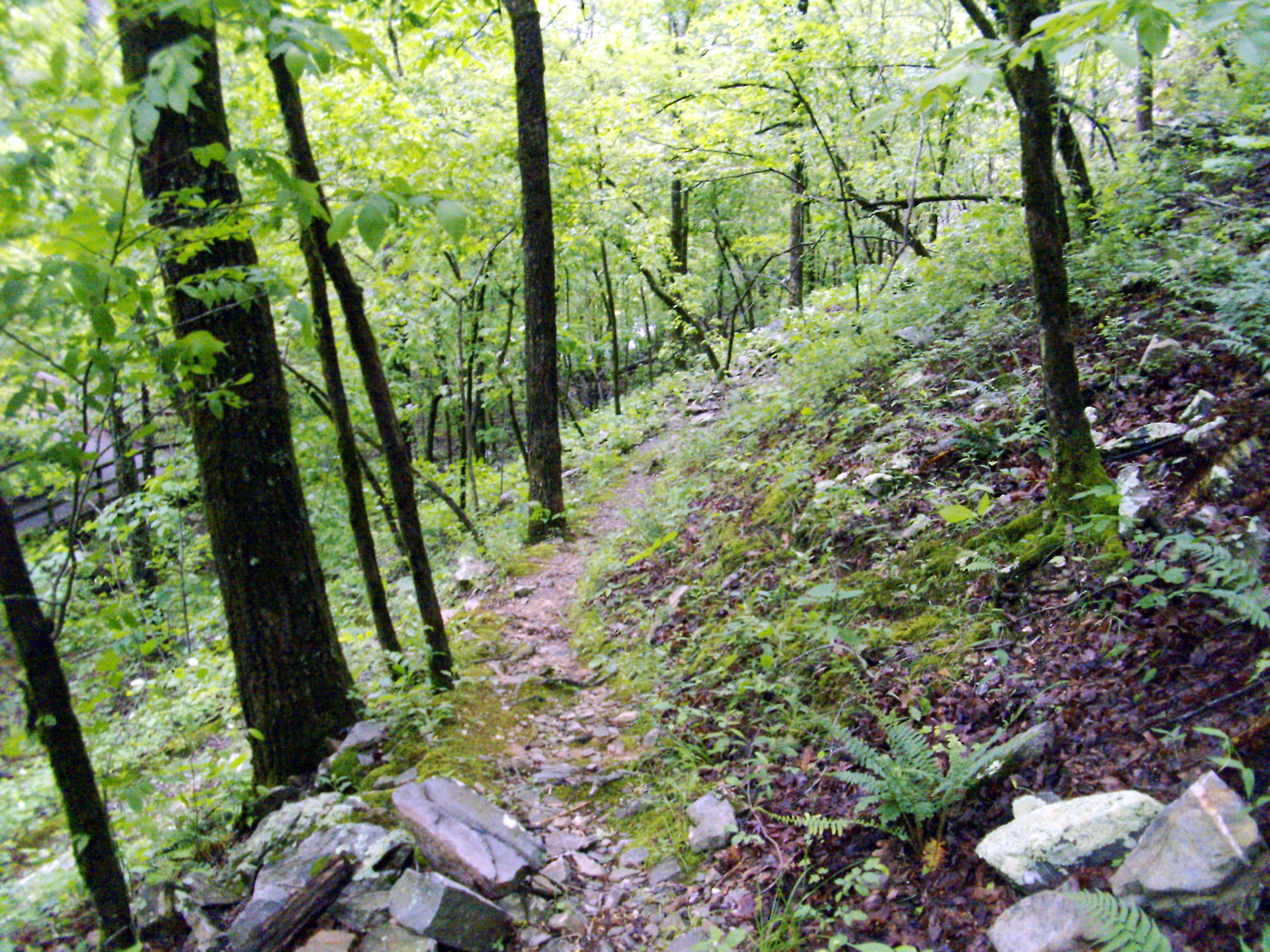
Trail up the mountain, 2014

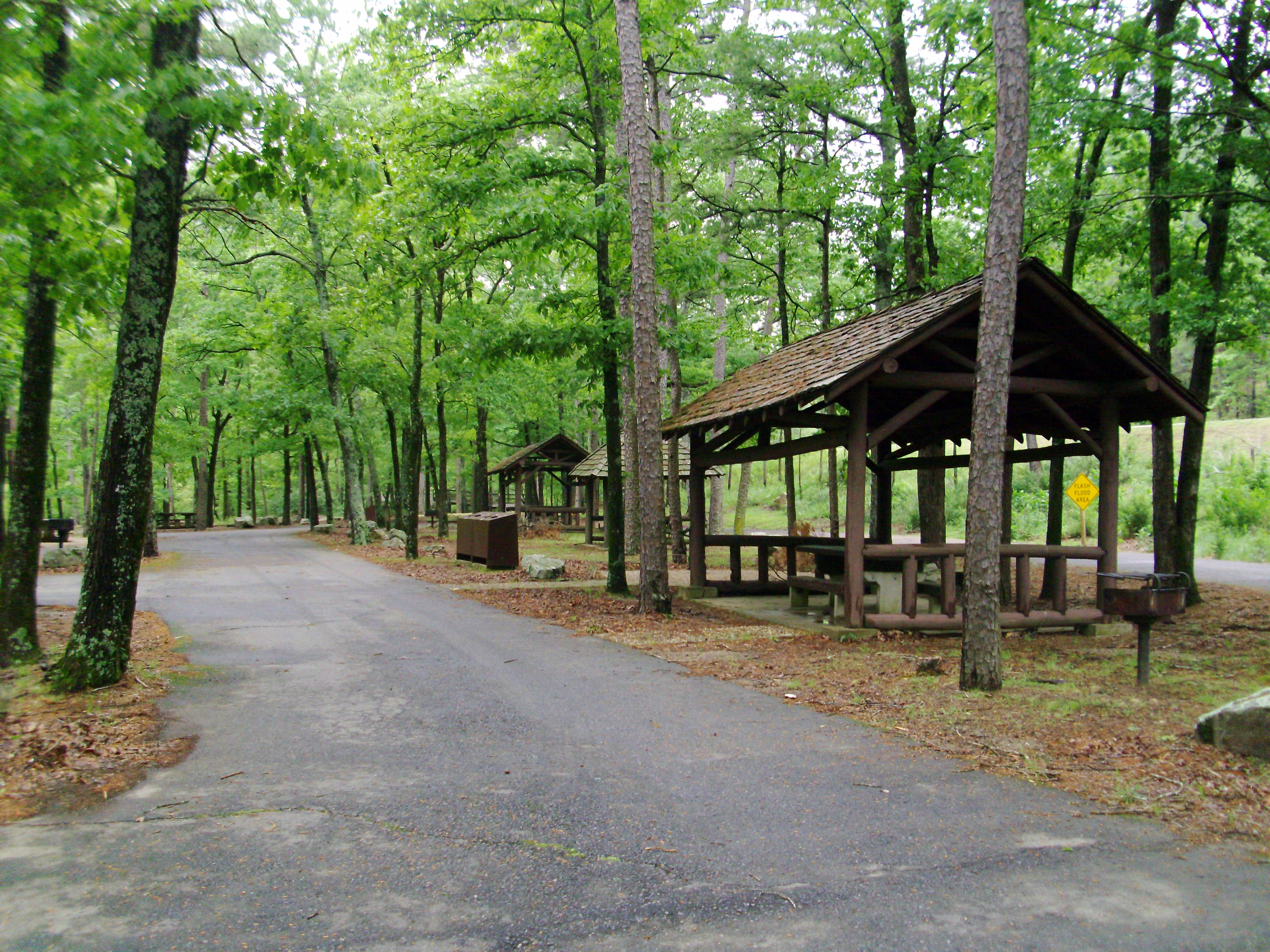
Picnic area, 2014

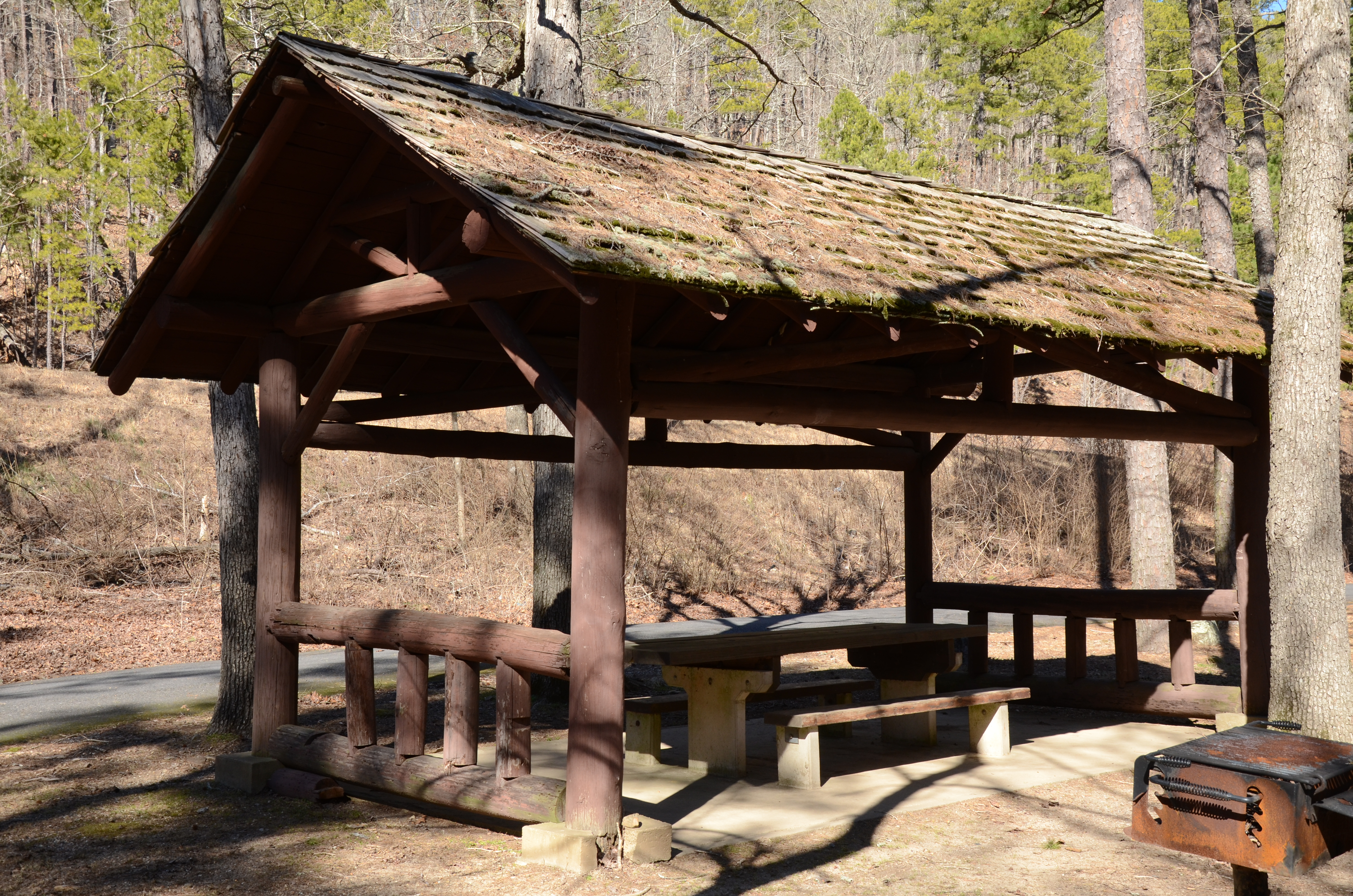
Iron Springs Shelter No. 1, 2016

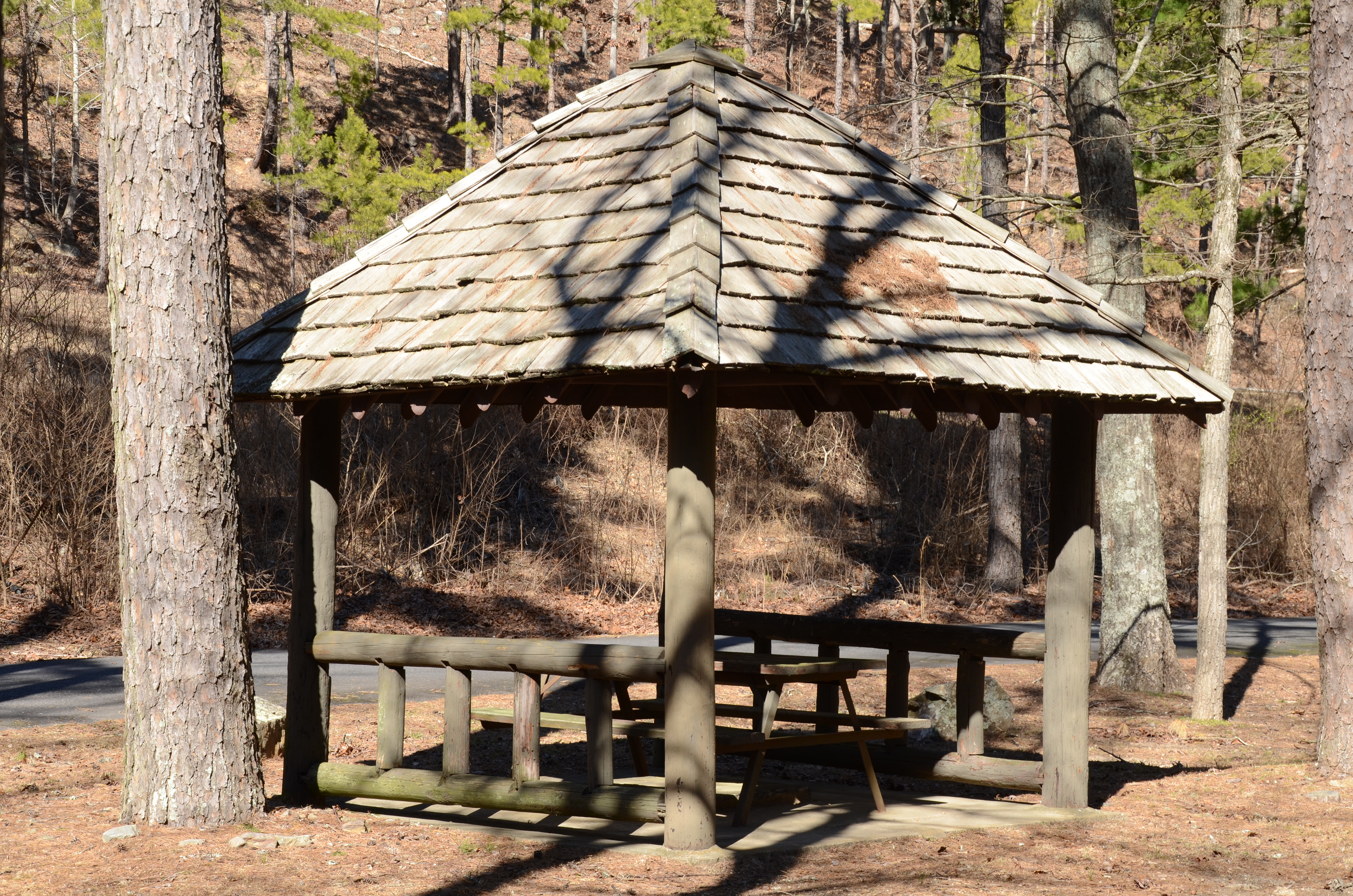
Iron Springs Shelter No. 2, 2016

== See also ==
- National Register of Historic Places listings in Garland County, Arkansas
