= Apache, Arizona (disambiguation) =

Apache in Arizona include:

== Places ==
Places named Apache in the U.S. state of Arizona include:

=== In Apache County ===
- Apache County, Arizona; a county
  - Apache County School District No. 27
- Apache Peak (White Mountains), Apache County; the tallest peak of Sunrise Park Resort, a mountain in the White Mountains on the Colorado Plateau

=== In Conchise County ===
- Apache, Arizona; a ghost town in Conchise County
- Apache Peak (Whetstone Mountains), Conchise County; the highest peak of the Whetstone Mountains; a mountain in Coronado National Forest
- Apache Pass, a mountain pass in Conchise County
  - Apache Pass Station, a former stagecoach station in the pass
- Apache Spring, a spring in Apache Pass, Conchise County

=== In Maricopa County ===
- Apache Lake (Arizona); a lake, a dam reservoir on the Salt River in Maricopa County
- Apache Wells, Arizona; a community in the city of Mesa, Maricopa County; a suburb of Phoenix

=== Elsewhere ===
- Apache Junction, Arizona; a city in Pinal County
  - Apache Junction High School
- Fort Apache, Arizona; an unincorporated community in Navajo County
- Fort Apache Indian Reservation, Arizona
  - Fort Apache Historic Park in Gila County on the reservation
- Apache Trail, a stagecoach trail in the Superstition Mountains of Arizona
- Apache Creek Wilderness

== Other uses ==
- The Apache, one of the indigenous peoples of Arizona

== See also ==
- Search for Apache+Arizona
- Apache–Sitgreaves National Forests, Arizona
