= Woodbury Fire =

2019 wildfire in Arizona, USA

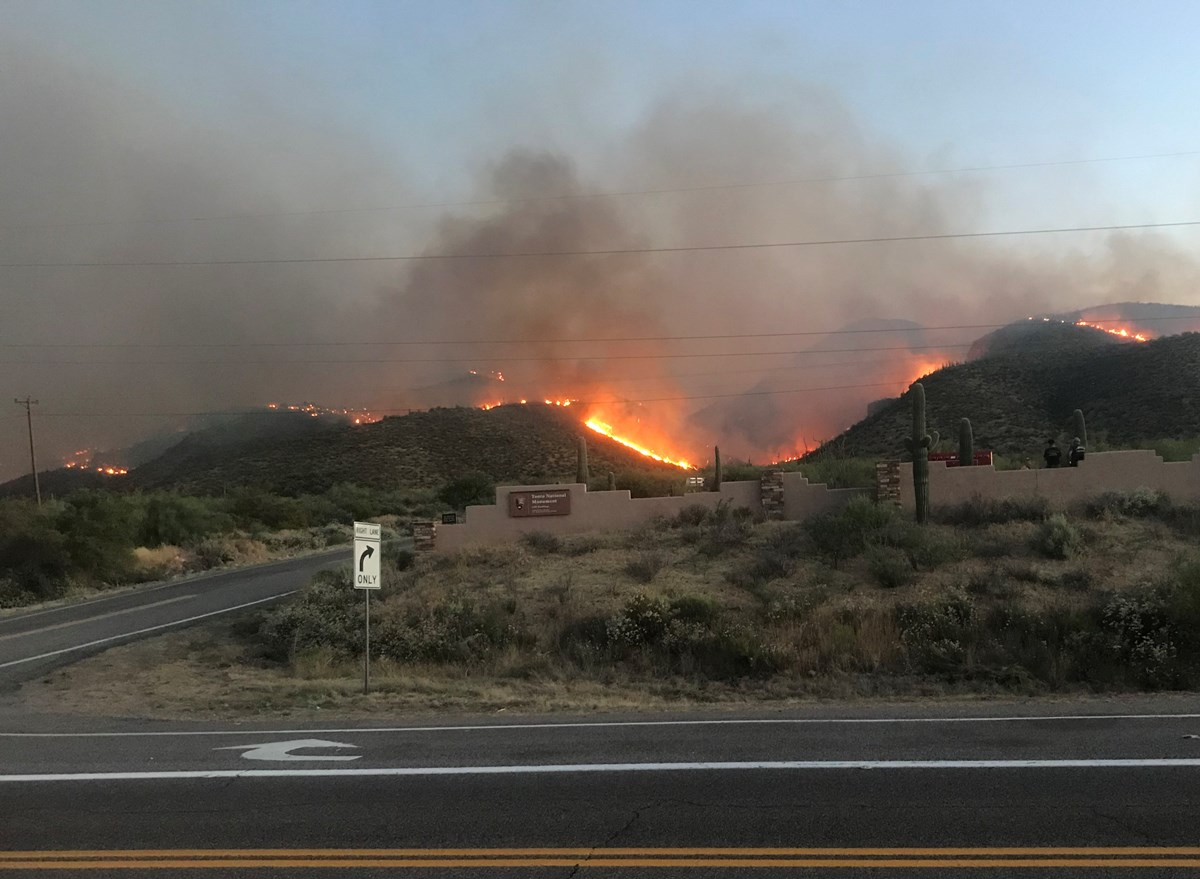
- Tonto National Monument during firing operations
- Location: Superstition Mountains, Arizona

Statistics
- Burned area: 123,875 acres (50,130 ha)

Ignition
- Cause: Human activity

Woodbury Fire was a wildfire in the Superstition Wilderness, northwest of Superior, Arizona, that started on June 8, 2019. The fire burned a total area of 123,875 acres. It was the fifth largest wildfire in Arizona’s history. The blaze caused the evacuation of homes, road and campground closures, endangered wildlife habitats, and the destruction of hiking trails and archaeological sites.

== Origin ==
The fire erupted five miles in the Superstition Mountains east of Mesa, near the Woodbury Trailhead, north of Superior, Arizona, in the Tonto National Forest. The origin of the fire was human-based.

== Description ==
The fire was reported around 1:28 PM on June 8. On June 18, the fire was only 6% contained, and 40,557 acres were burnt. By June 21, the fire had burnt 54, 998 acres, while the containment had dropped from 42% to 34%. As of Tuesday night, June 26, the fire had scorched 121,899 acres, and firefighters had contained 48% of the fire.

Due to the size and complexity of the fire, both government agencies and private contractors were deployed to gain control of the fire. By mid-June, there were 450 firefighters to fight the flames.

On Monday, July 15, by 7:00 PM, the fire was fully contained.

=== Use of UAS ===
On June 26, 2019, an unmanned aircraft system (UAS) was deployed by Justin Baxter, a drone fire operations specialist, and his three-man team. They flew a Matrice 600 (M600) for gathering data on the magnitude of damage and locating hot spots using an infrared sensor.

== Consequences ==
The fire destroyed the habitat of the white-tailed and mule deer, javelinas, bighorn sheep, black bears, coyotes, bobcats and gray foxes. It also burnt 989 acres of land within Tonto National Monument.

== Closures ==
The areas burned by the fire presented the risk of severe flooding due to which a 7-mile, unpaved section of State Route 88 (Apache Trail), starting past Tortilla Flat to State Highway 188 at Theodore Roosevelt Dam, was closed. Apache Lake and Marina, Apache Campgrounds, and picnic sites were also sealed.

A portion of the Arizona Trail (AZT) and Hewitt Station (Forest Road 357) was also closed for public safety. The Forest Service closed sites included Crabtree Wash, Davis Wash, Burnt Corral, Three-Mile Wash, and Fish Creek.
