= Canyon Lake (Arizona) =

Waterbody in Maricopa County, Arizona

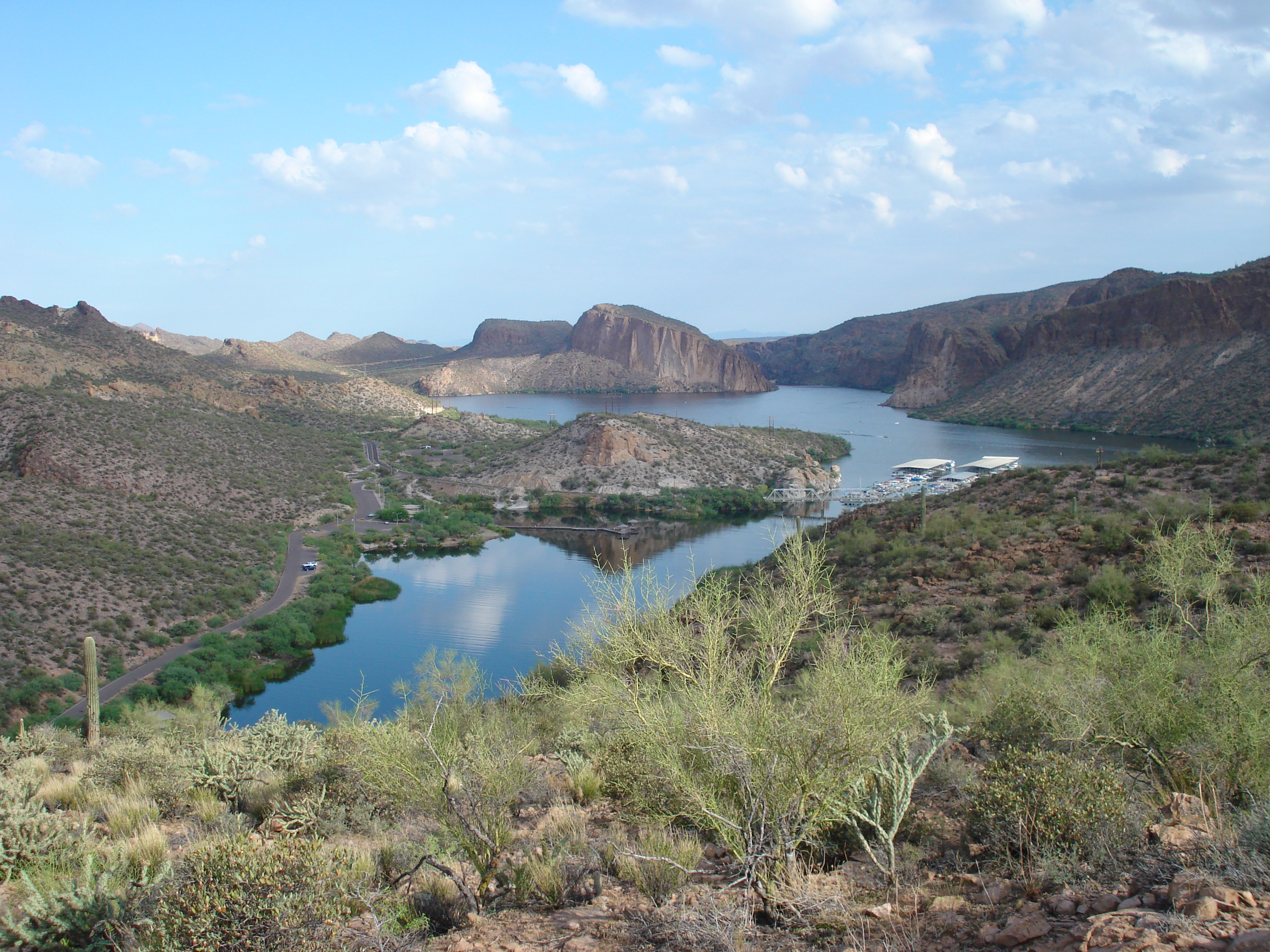
- View from the Boulder Canyon Trail

- Location within Arizona Location within the United States
- Location: Maricopa County, Arizona
- Coordinates: 33°32′37″N 111°26′12″W
- Lake type: reservoir
- Primary inflows: Salt River
- Primary outflows: Salt River
- Basin countries: United States
- Surface area: 950 acres (380 ha)
- Average depth: 130 ft (40 m)
- Surface elevation: 1,660 ft (510 m)

Canyon Lake is one of four reservoirs that were formed by the damming of the Salt River in the U.S. state of Arizona as part of the Salt River Project. It was formed by the Mormon Flat Dam, which was completed in 1925 after two years of construction. Canyon Lake, with a surface area of 950 acres (380 ha), is the third and smallest of the four lakes created along the river. Two others, Apache Lake and Roosevelt Lake, are upstream. The fourth, Saguaro Lake, is downstream.

Canyon Lake lies approximately 15 miles (24 km) up the Apache Trail from Apache Junction, Arizona and 51 miles (82 km) east of Phoenix. It is within the Superstition Wilderness of Tonto National Forest and is a popular recreation area for the Phoenix metropolitan area. Recreation amenities include hiking trails, camping, and boating, all managed by the United States Forest Service. Canyon Lake is a popular stop along the Apache Trail (Arizona State Route 88) from Apache Junction, Arizona, passing Tortilla Flat, Arizona, before reaching Apache Lake and Roosevelt Lake behind Theodore Roosevelt Dam.

In 2022, a fish kill caused by golden algae affected 100,000 fish.

== Fish species ==
- Rainbow Trout
- Largemouth Bass
- Smallmouth Bass
- Yellow Bass
- Crappie
- Sunfish
- Catfish (Channel)
- Walleye
- Carp

== Gallery ==
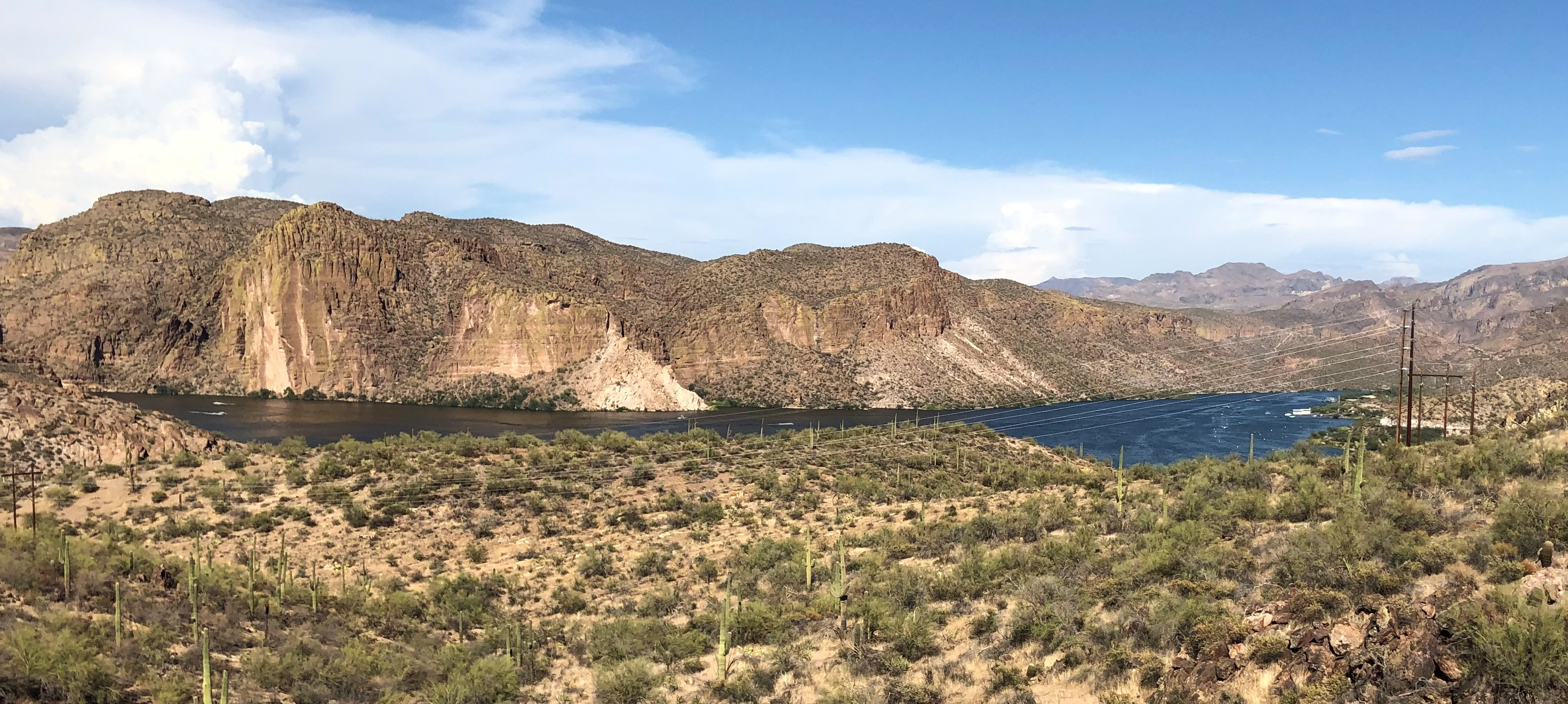
Canyon Lake as seen from Canyon Lake Vista on the Apache Trail (Arizona State Route 88)

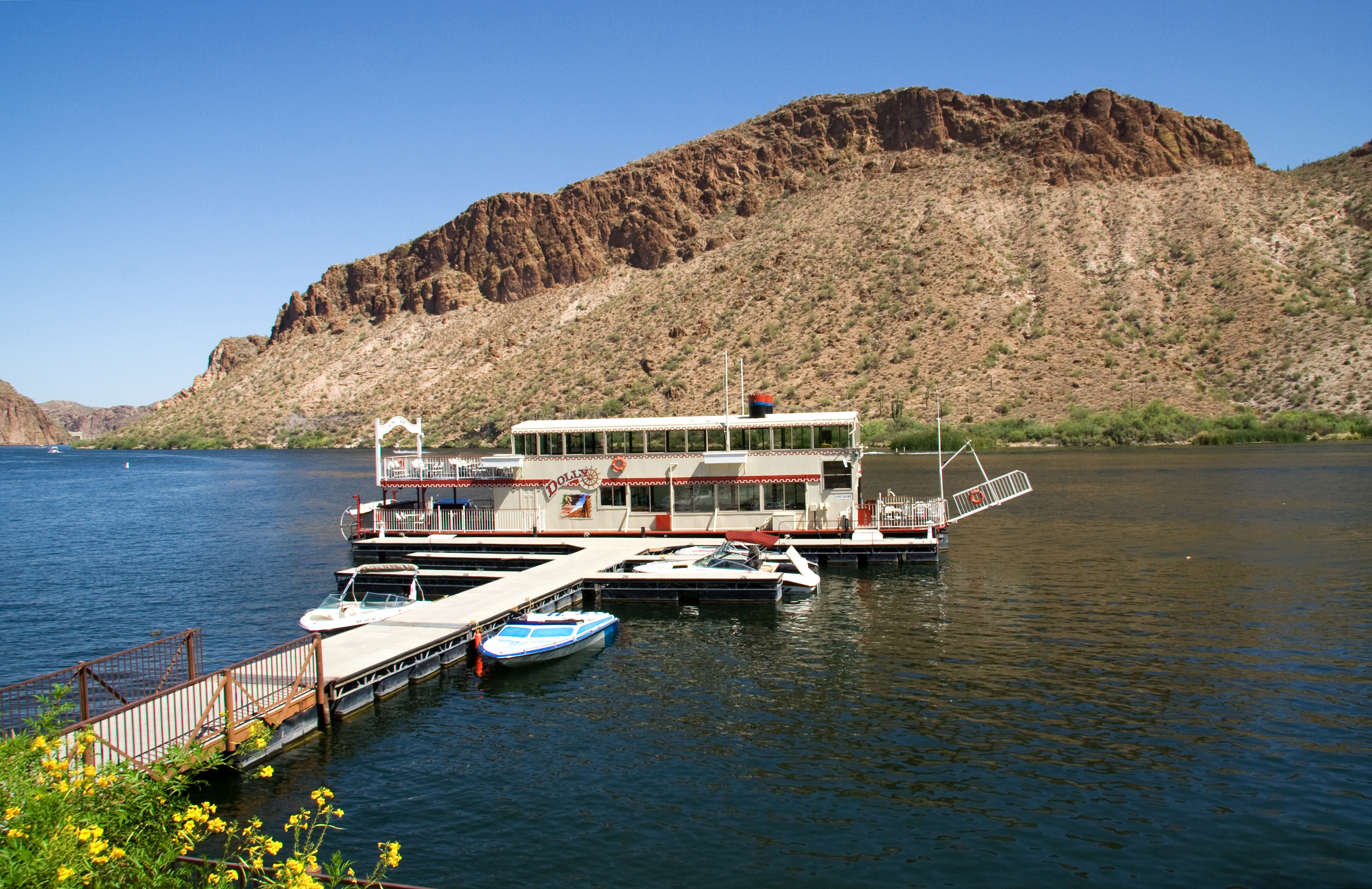
The Dolly Steamboat

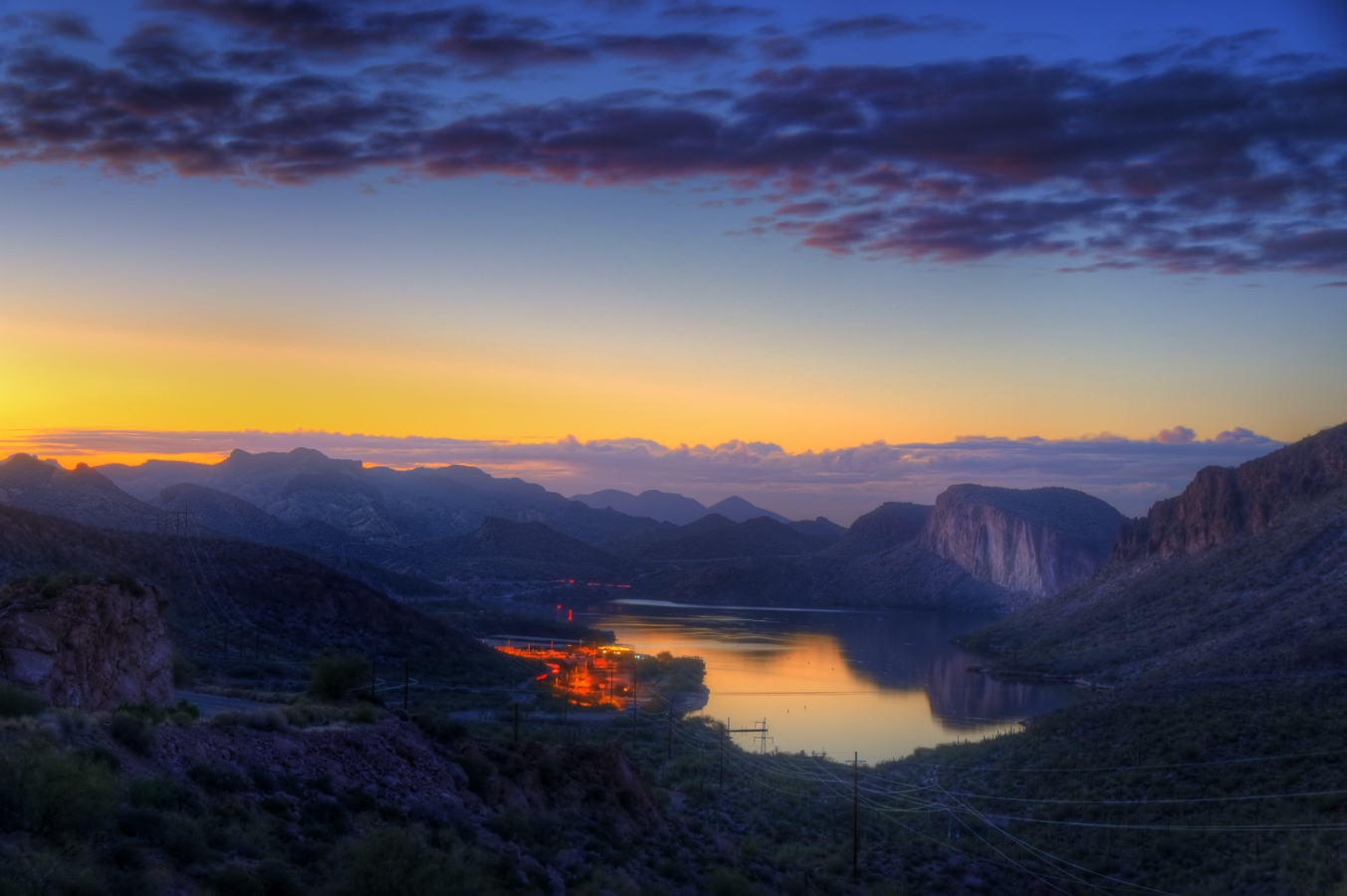
The lake at dusk...

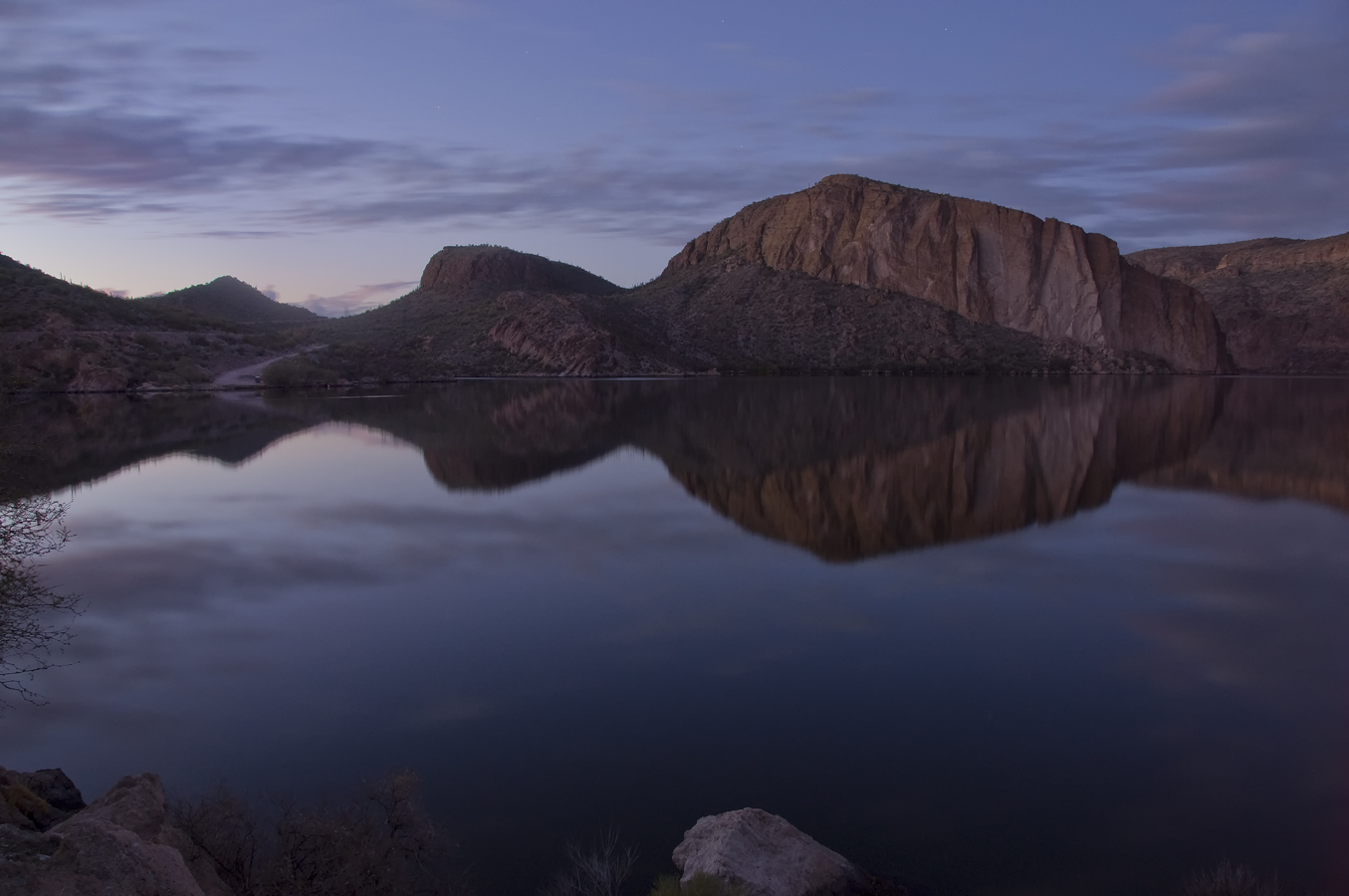
...and just after sunset.
