= Horse Mesa Dam =

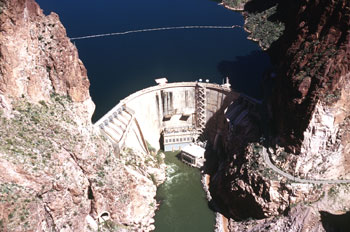
- Interactive map of Horse Mesa Dam
- Country: United States
- Location: Tonto National Forest, Maricopa County, Arizona
- Coordinates: 33°35′27″N 111°20′38″W
- Construction began: 1924
- Opening date: 1927
- Owner: U.S. Bureau of Reclamation
- Operator: Salt River Project

Dam and spillways
- Type of dam: Concrete thin arch
- Impounds: Salt River
- Height: 305 ft (93 m)
- Length: 660 ft (200 m)
- Width (crest): 8 ft (2.4 m)
- Width (base): 57 ft (17 m)
- Dam volume: 162,000 yd^{3} (124,000 m^{3})
- Spillways: Gated concrete tunnel and over-the-crest
- Spillway capacity: 150,000 cu ft/s (4,200 m^{3}/s)

Reservoir
- Creates: Apache Lake
- Total capacity: 245,138 acre⋅ft (0.302373 km^{3})
- Catchment area: 5,842 mi^{2} (15,130 km^{2})
- Surface area: 2,656 acres (1,075 ha)
- Normal elevation: 1,919 ft (585 m)

Power Station
- Turbines: 3x 11^{2}/_{3}MW units, 1x 97MW pumped-storage unit
- Installed capacity: 129 MW

The Horse Mesa Dam is a concrete thin arch dam located in the Superstition Mountains, northeast of Phoenix in Maricopa County, Arizona.

The dam is 660 feet (200 m) long, 300 feet (91 m) high and was built between 1924 and 1927. The dam includes three conventional hydroelectric generating units totaling 32 megawatts (MW) and a pumped-storage unit with a capacity of 97 MW.

The dam and associated infrastructure were listed on the National Register of Historic Places in 2017.

A few homes are nearby for temporary employee housing. Its name is derived from when sheep-herders used to graze their saddle and pack animals on the mesa when they were driving their flocks through the area. It has an estimated elevation of 2,067 feet (630 m) above sea level.

== Reservoir ==
The dam forms Apache Lake as it impounds the Salt River. The dam and reservoir are located downstream from the Theodore Roosevelt Dam, and upstream from the Mormon Flat Dam.

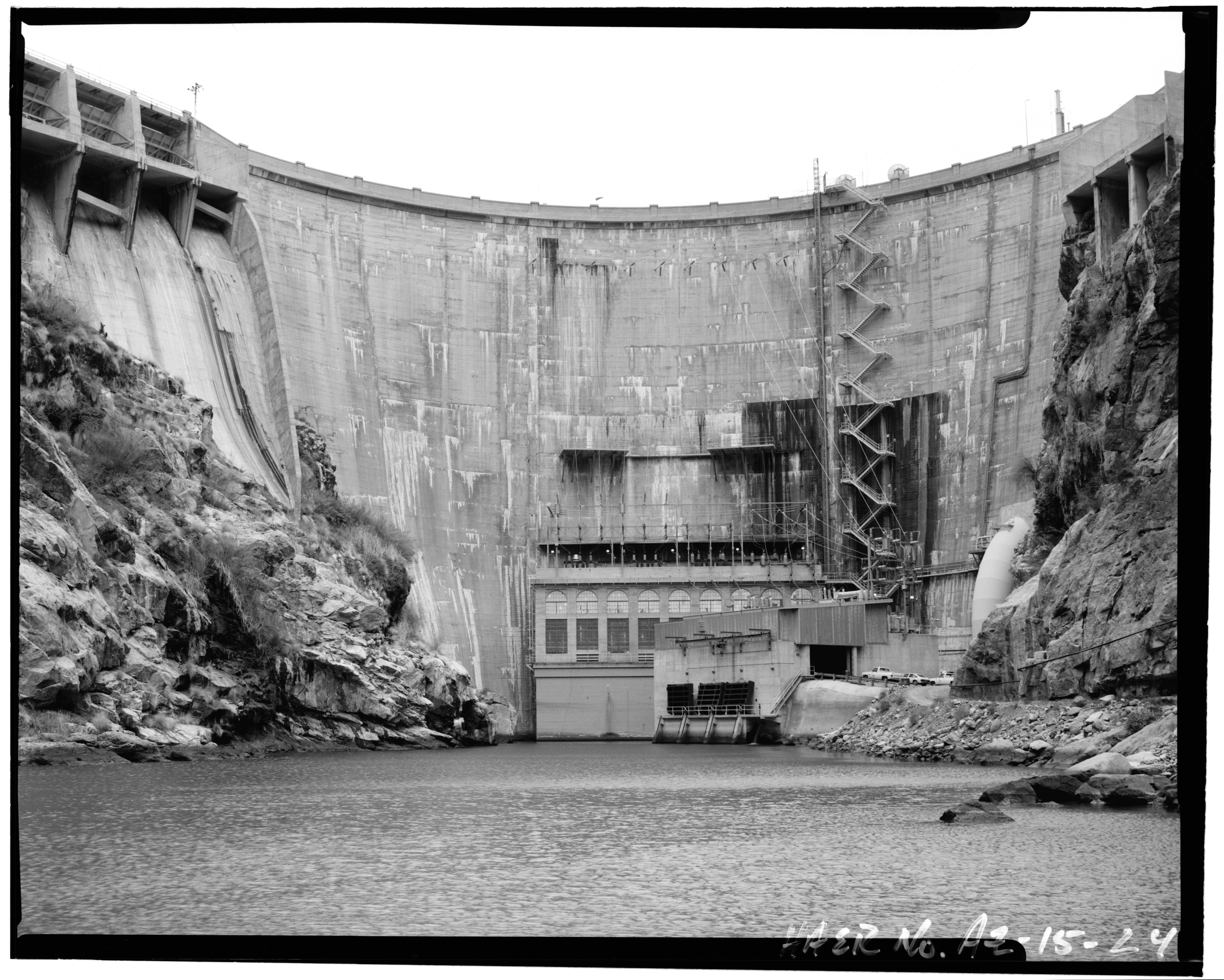
Downstream view of Horse Mesa Dam.

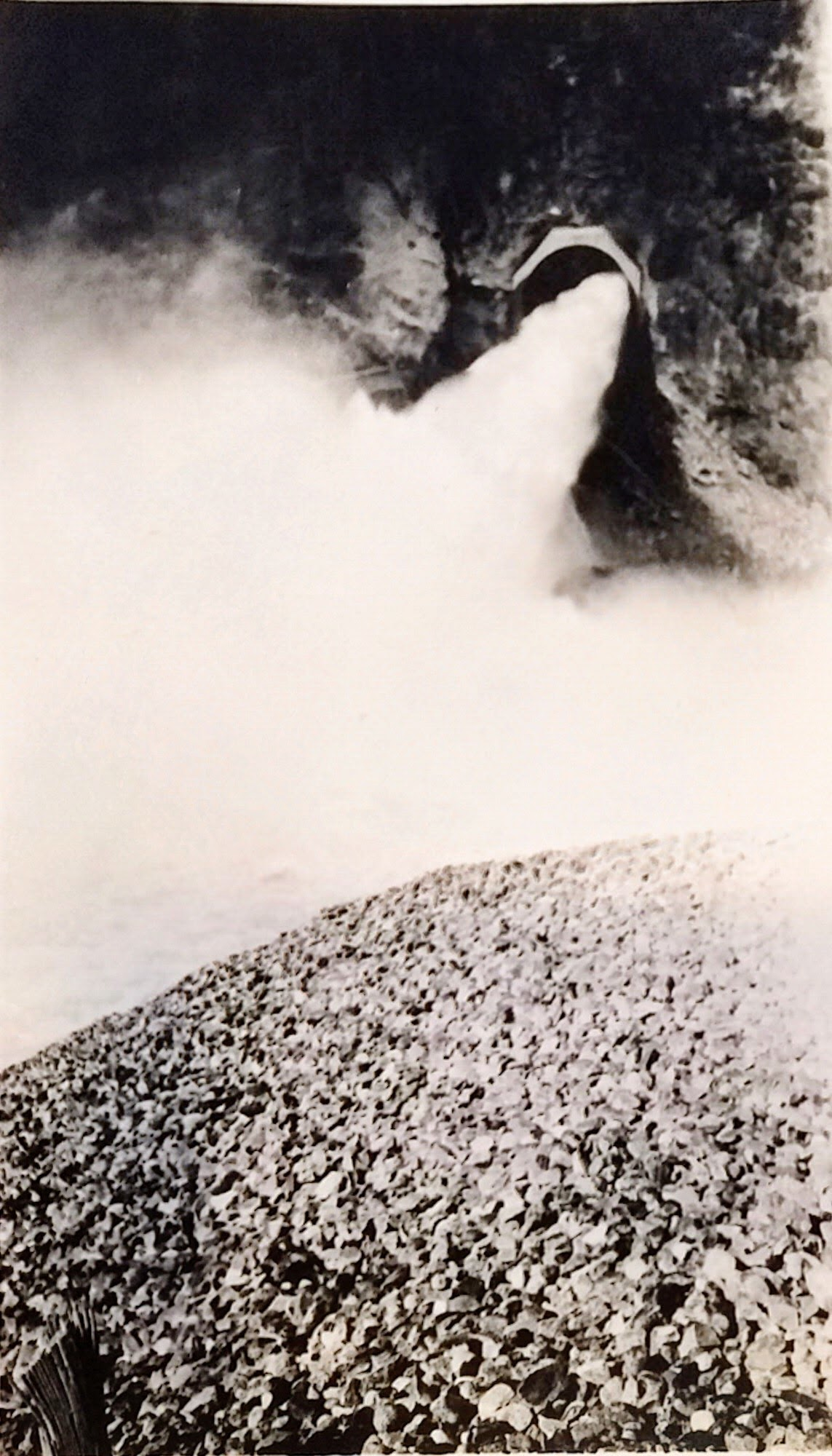
Water flowing out of a spillway at Horse Mesa, circa 1940

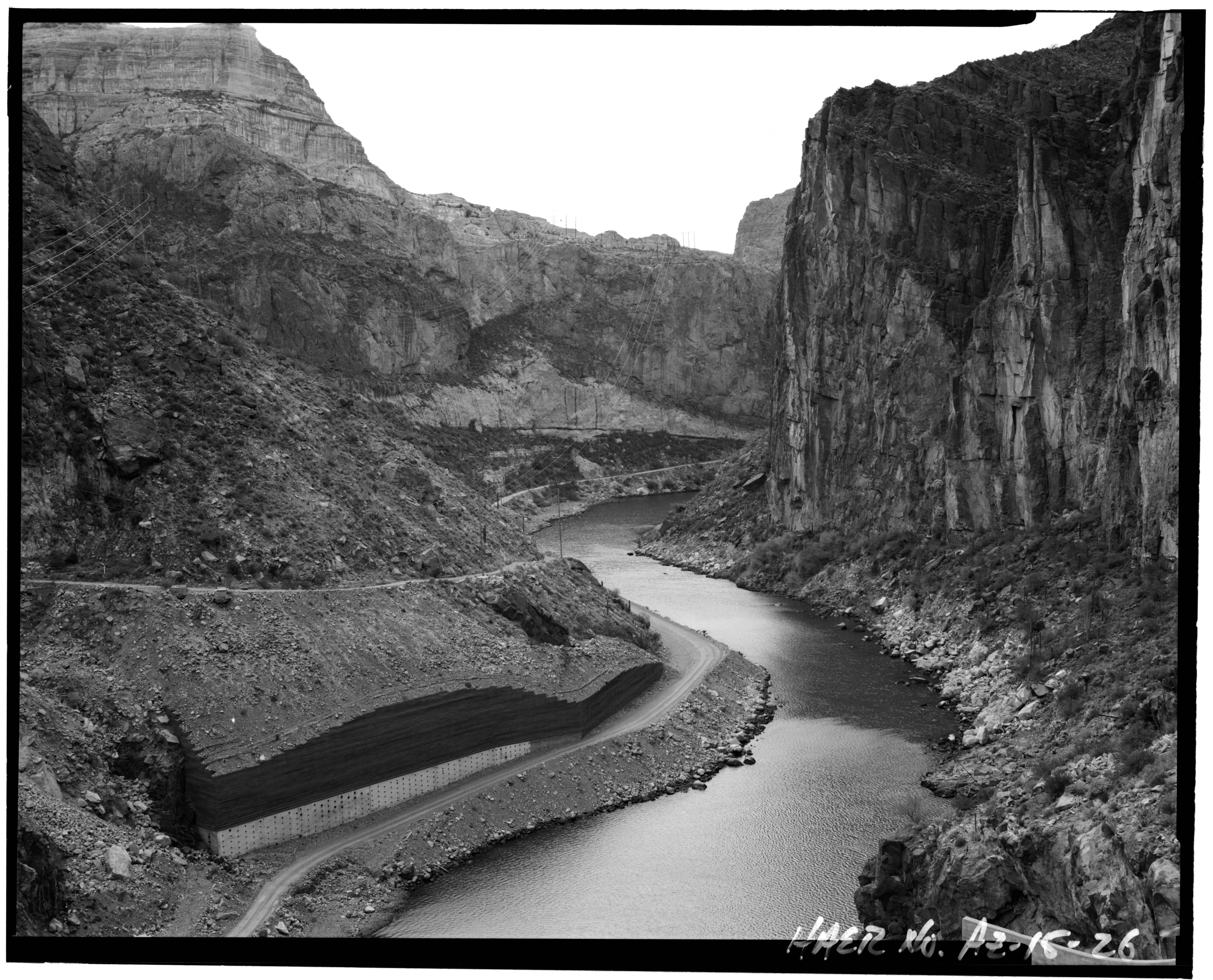
Salt River below the dam.
