= Goldfield Mountains =

Mountains in Maricopa County, Arizona

Coordinates: 33°31′N 111°31′W

The Goldfield Mountains of Arizona are located adjacent to the Superstition Mountains, between Usery Pass and Canyon Lake (Arizona). In 1893, the southern part of the Goldfield Mountains was a large mining district.

== Hiking ==
Because there are no trails on the higher parts of the mountains, hiking is only done by advanced hikers. The trails on the lower parts of the mountains are dirt roadways that were created for miners and ranchers. Arizona State Route 88 runs south of the mountains, and the Saguaro Lake (Arizona) can be found north of them.

== Vegetation and Wildlife ==
The vegetation zone in the Goldfield Mountains is the Arizona Upland subdivision of the Sonoran Desert, which is also called the saguaro-palo verde forest. Wildlife in these mountains is part of the upper Sonoran ecosystem. These mountains are part of the Tonto National Forest. They contain palo verde, mesquite, ironwood, desert willow, and catclaw trees. There are ocotillo, saltbush, creosote bush, jojoba, agave, and hackberry shrubs. There are also many different kinds of cacti present there. Saguaros are plentiful and so are the pencil cholla cacti. Many different kinds of animals and wildlife creatures have been spotted in the Goldfield Mountains. These include deer, javelinas, foxes, coyotes, roadrunners, red-tailed hawks, bald eagles, and desert tortoises. There are smaller species in these mountains that are protected including gila monsters and smaller lizards, rattlesnakes and smaller snakes, ground squirrels, tarantulas, centipedes, and horned toads.
