= Arizona State Route 88 =

Highway in Arizona

State Route 88
- SR 88 highlighted in red

Route information
- Maintained by ADOT
- Length: 45.67 mi (73.50 km)
- Existed: 1927–present
- Tourist routes: Apache Trail Historic Road

Major junctions
- West end: US 60 in Apache Junction
- East end: SR 188 near Theodore Roosevelt Lake

Location
- Country: United States
- State: Arizona
- Counties: Pinal, Maricopa

Highway system
- Arizona State Highway System; Interstate; US; State; Scenic Proposed; Former
← SR 87	→ US 89

State Route 88 is a state highway in the U.S. state of Arizona. It runs from U.S. Route 60 (US 60) in Apache Junction through desert terrain to SR 188 near Roosevelt Dam. Following the Salt River for much of its length, the section east of Tortilla Flat is known as the Apache Trail and is part of the National Forest Scenic Byway system. The Apache Trail was built in the mid-1920s, and the number 88 was assigned in 1927. An eastern extension of State Route 88 to Globe, Arizona was redesignated as State Route 188 on August 20, 1999.

== Route description ==
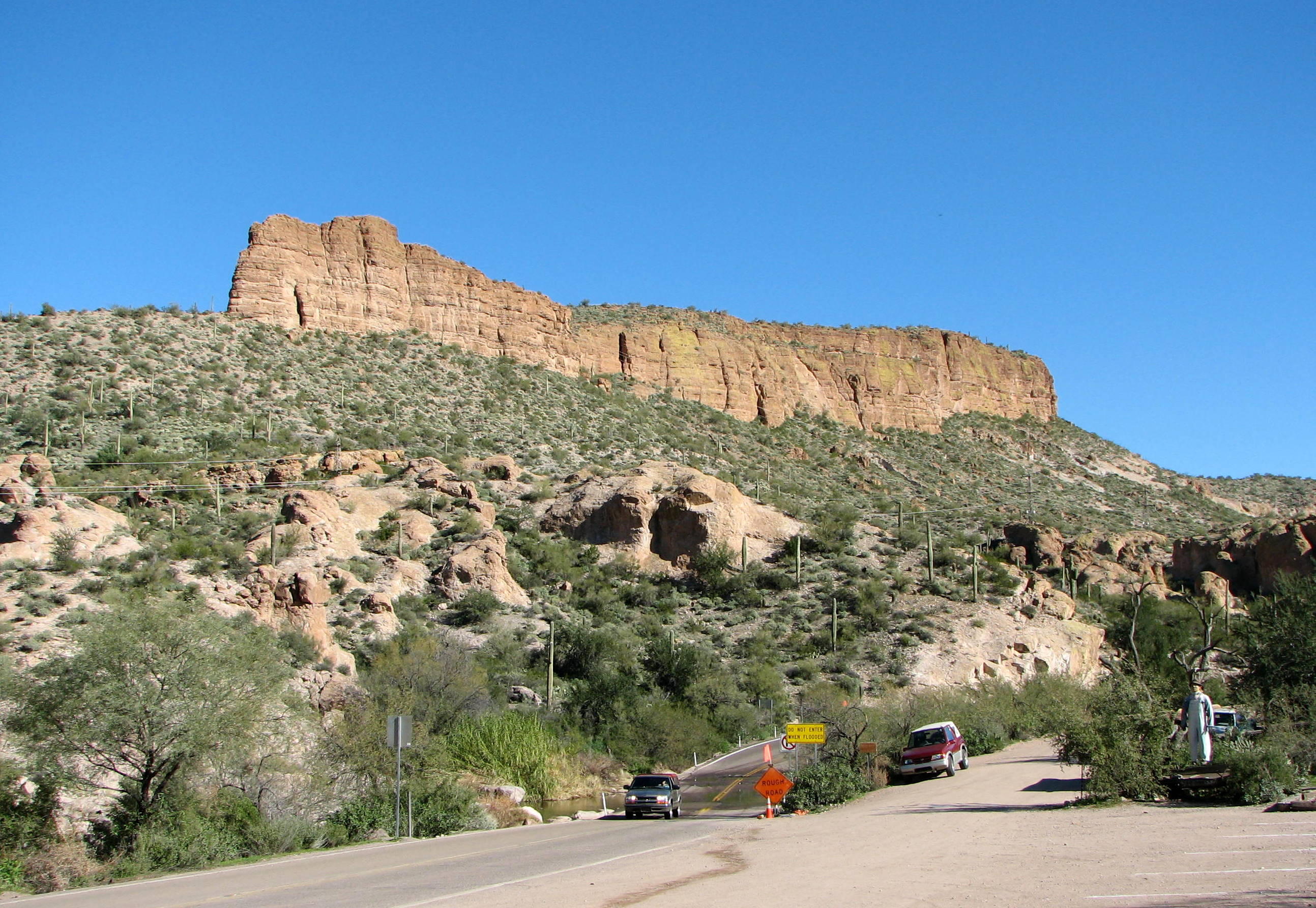
State Route 88 at Tortilla Flat

SR 88 begins at a diamond interchange with US 60, the Superstition Freeway, in southern Apache Junction. The route follows Idaho Road northward through a residential area with four lanes. Following a junction with Old West Highway, SR 88 turns northeast onto Apache Trail and narrows to two lanes. The route exits the city limits of Apache Junction, entering desert terrain. Passing a ghost town known as Goldfield, Apache Trail enters Tonto National Forest just northwest of Lost Dutchman State Park. SR 88 nears Canyon Lake south of the Mormon Flat Dam and follows a part of the southern shore of Canyon Lake. Apache Trail heads away from the Salt River. It passes through the town of Tortilla Flat, becoming an unpaved dirt trail winding eastward through the Superstition Mountains. SR 88 again turns northeast and nears Apache Lake. The route follows the Salt River northeast to the Theodore Roosevelt Dam, near which the route is again paved. SR 88 intersects with SR 188 along the coast of Theodore Roosevelt Lake.

The highway is maintained by the Arizona Department of Transportation (ADOT), which is responsible for maintaining highways in the state, including SR 88. As part of this role, ADOT periodically surveys traffic along its routes. These surveys are presented in the form of average annual daily traffic, which is the number of vehicles who use the route on any average day during the year. In 2009, ADOT calculated that around as few as 400 vehicles used the route daily near the Roosevelt Dam and as many as 16,000 daily at the US 60 interchange in Apache Junction. The section east of Canyon Lake is part of the Apache Trail National Forest Scenic Byway system. No part of the highway has been listed in the National Highway System, a system of roads in the United States important to the nation's economy, defense, and mobility. Part of SR 88, known as the Apache Trail Historic Road, is one of only four state designated Historic Roads under the Arizona Parkways, Historic and Scenic Roads program.

Following the 2019 Woodbury Fire and subsequent damage to the unpaved portion of the route due to catastrophic flooding from the remnants of Hurricane Lorena, the road was closed from milepost 222 to 229 (roughly midway from Tortilla Flat to Roosevelt Dam). SR 88 was reopened in September 2024 after a $4 million restoration project. The road is limited to high-clearance four-wheel drive vehicles and utility terrain vehicles.

== History ==
SR 88 highway shield upon designation in 1927.

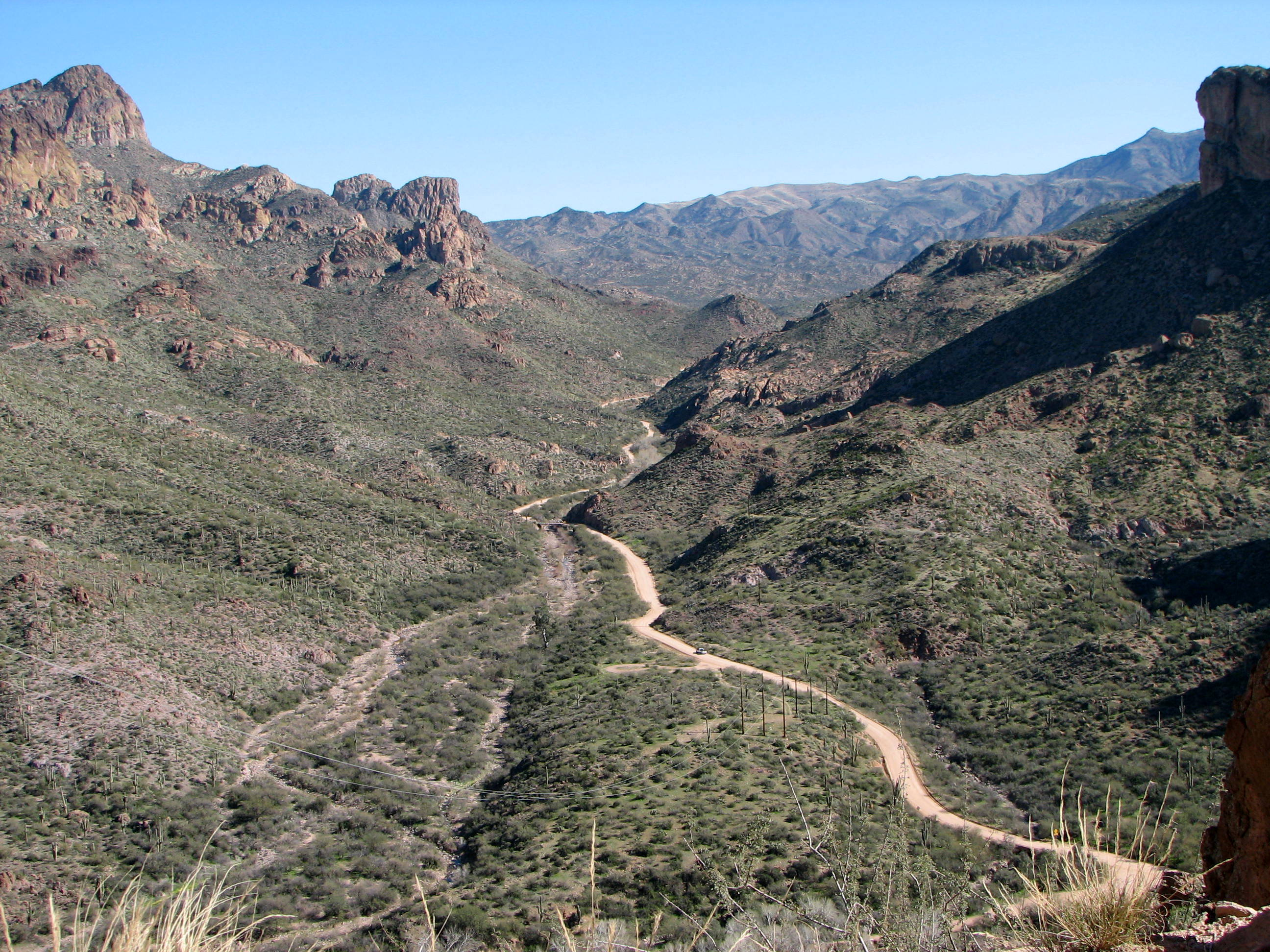
SR 88 near Fish Creek Hill

The Apache Trail connected the Old Spanish Trail where Apache Junction is today and Roosevelt Lake with an unpaved road as early as 1925, following much of the modern route. By the next year, SR 66 followed the Apache Trail and the Old Spanish Trail was numbered as US 80. The number 88 was given to the route by 1927, but continued past its current terminus east to US 180 west of Globe. US 60 and US 89 became concurrent with US 80 at the western terminus by 1935, and the US 70 designation was added to the road by 1939. The section of the route from Apache Junction to Canyon Lake was paved in the late 1940s. By 1958, the section east of Roosevelt Dam was paved. The extra designations at SR 88's western terminus were removed by 1971, leaving only the US 60 designation. August 20, 1999, the section east of Roosevelt Dam was renumbered as SR 188, cutting SR 88 back to its current terminus.

== Junction list ==
County	Location	mi	km	Destinations	Notes
Pinal	Apache Junction	0.00	0.00	US 60 (Superstition Freeway) – Phoenix, Globe	Interchange; western terminus; exit 196 on US 60; continues south as Idaho Road
Pinal	Apache Junction	1.84	2.96	Old West Highway (Historic US 80)	
Maricopa		45.67	73.50	SR 188 – Payson, Globe	Eastern terminus; former southern terminus of SR 188; Apache Trail continues east as SR 188 south (former SR 88 east)
1.000 mi = 1.609 km; 1.000 km = 0.621 mi

== See also ==
- Apache Trail
