= Apache Trail =

Historic stagecoach trail in Arizona

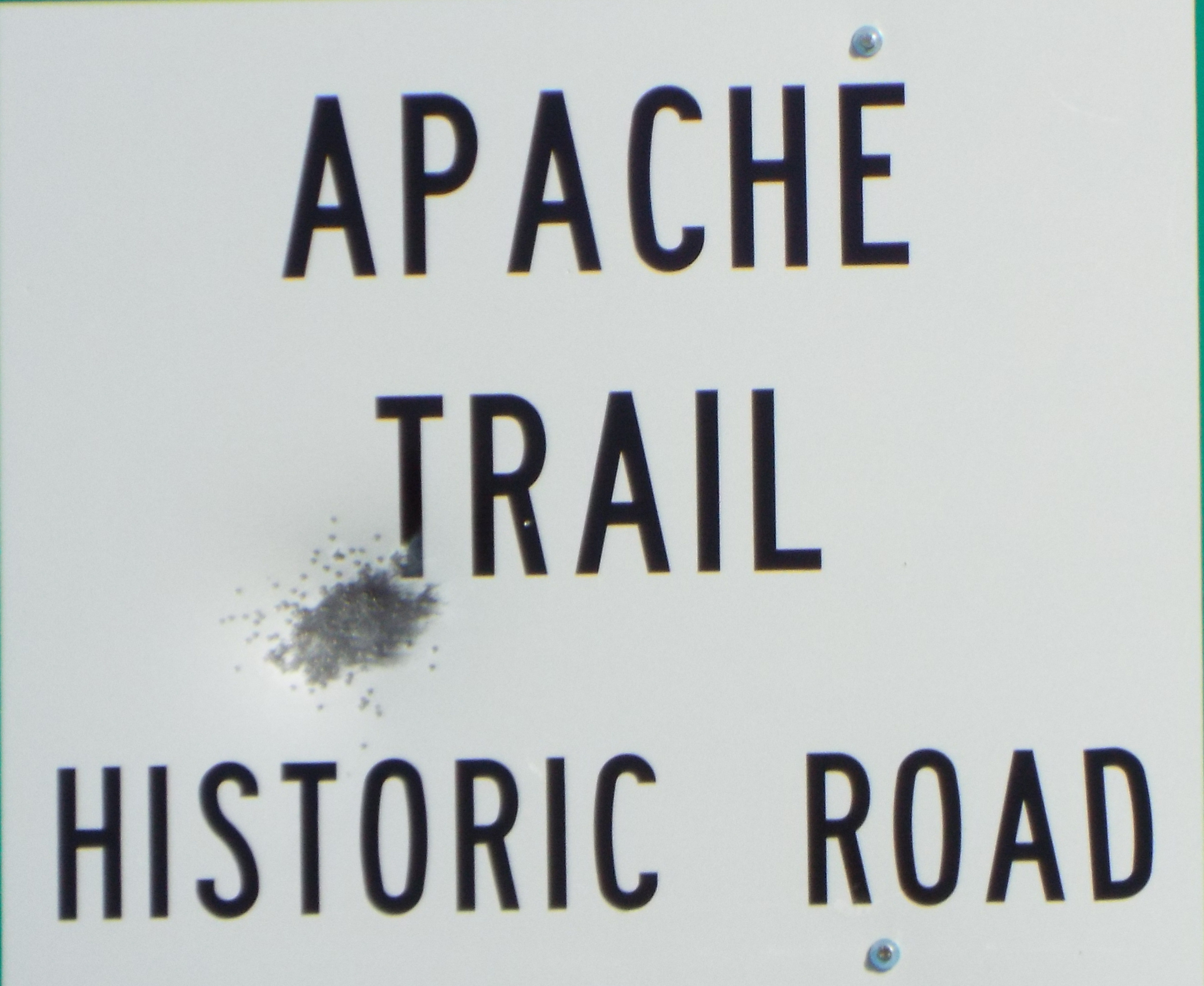
Historic Apache Trail road sign

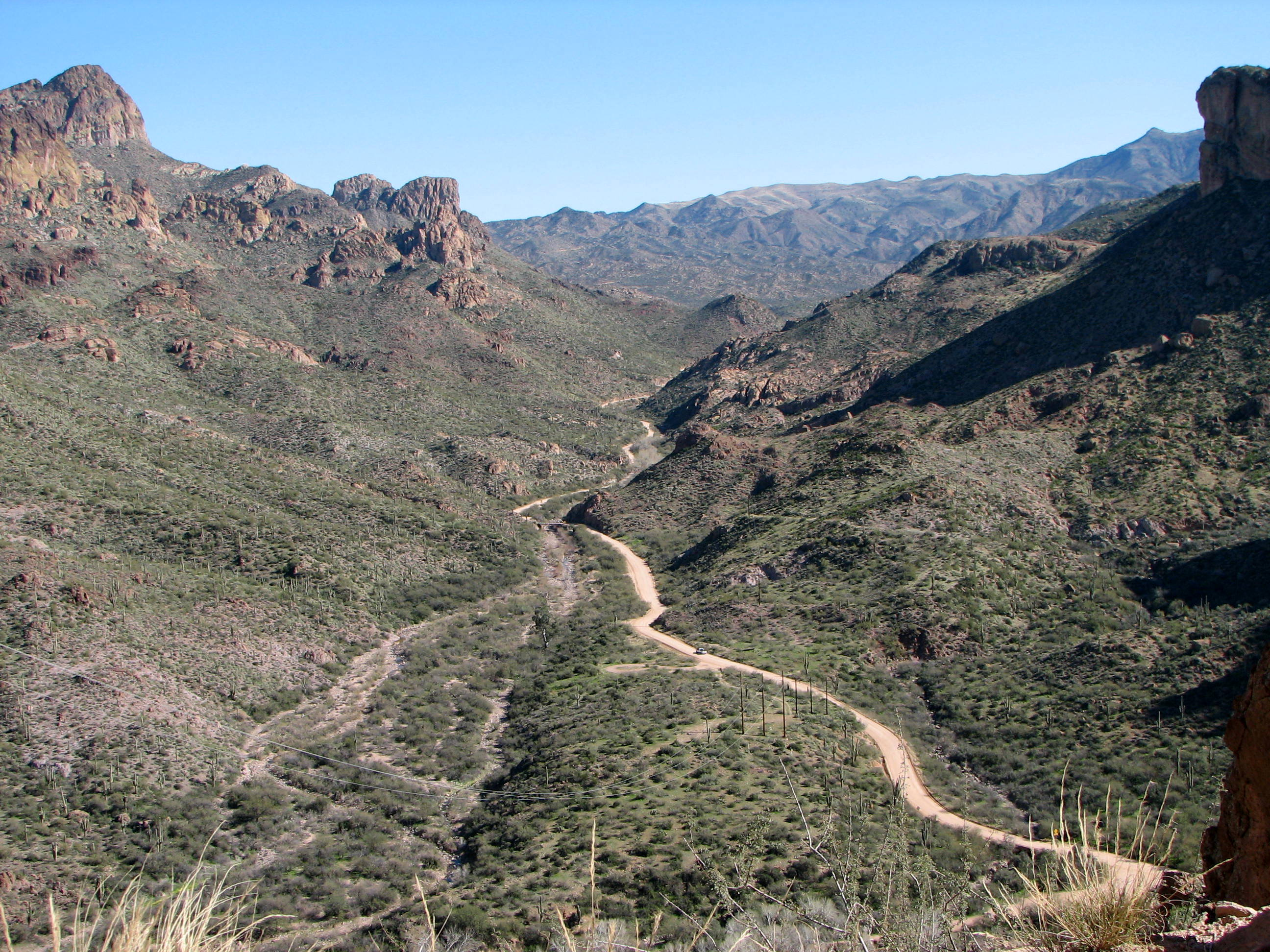
Apache Trail at Fish Creek Hill

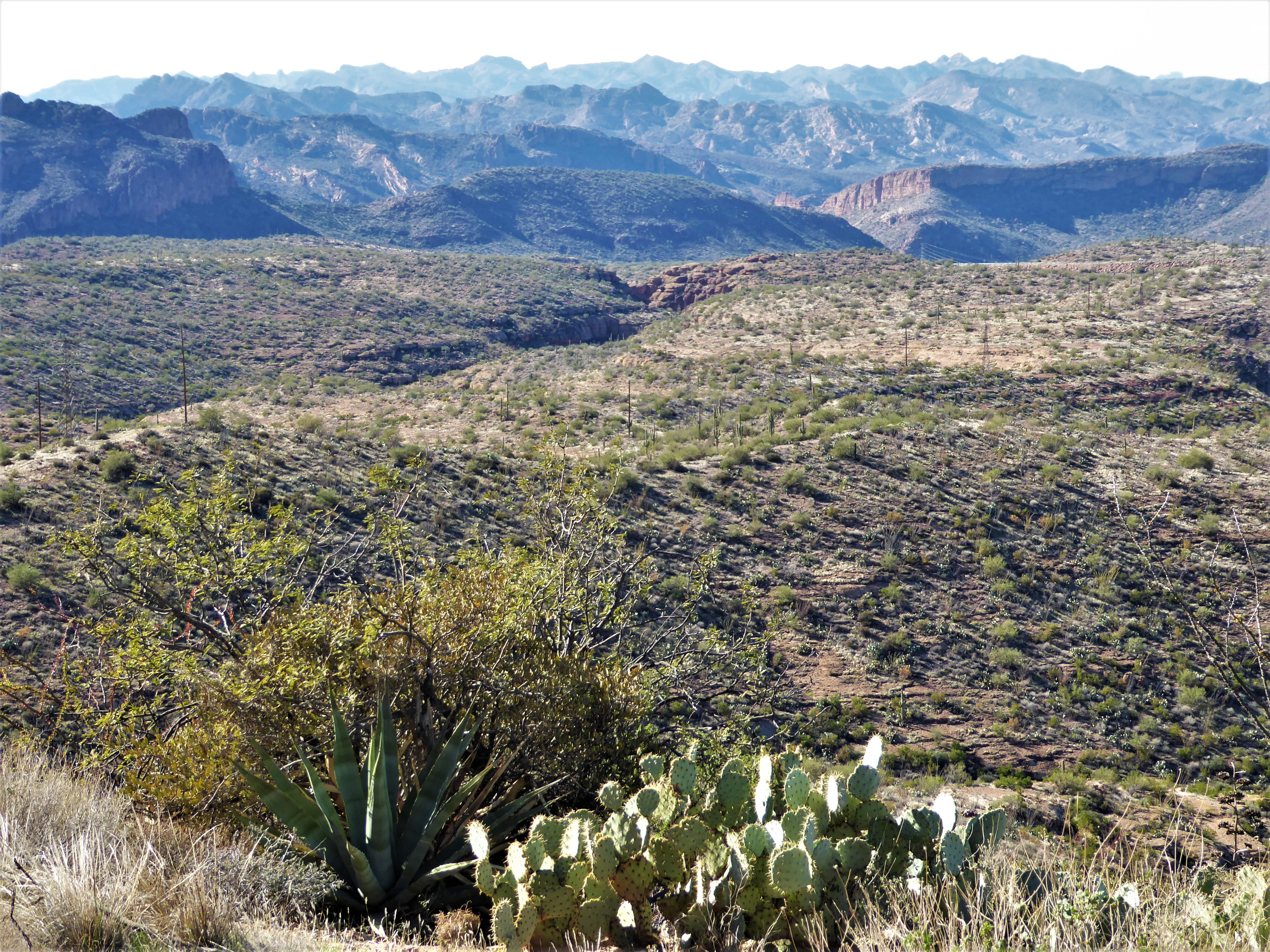
Apache Trail - looking southwest from near highest point

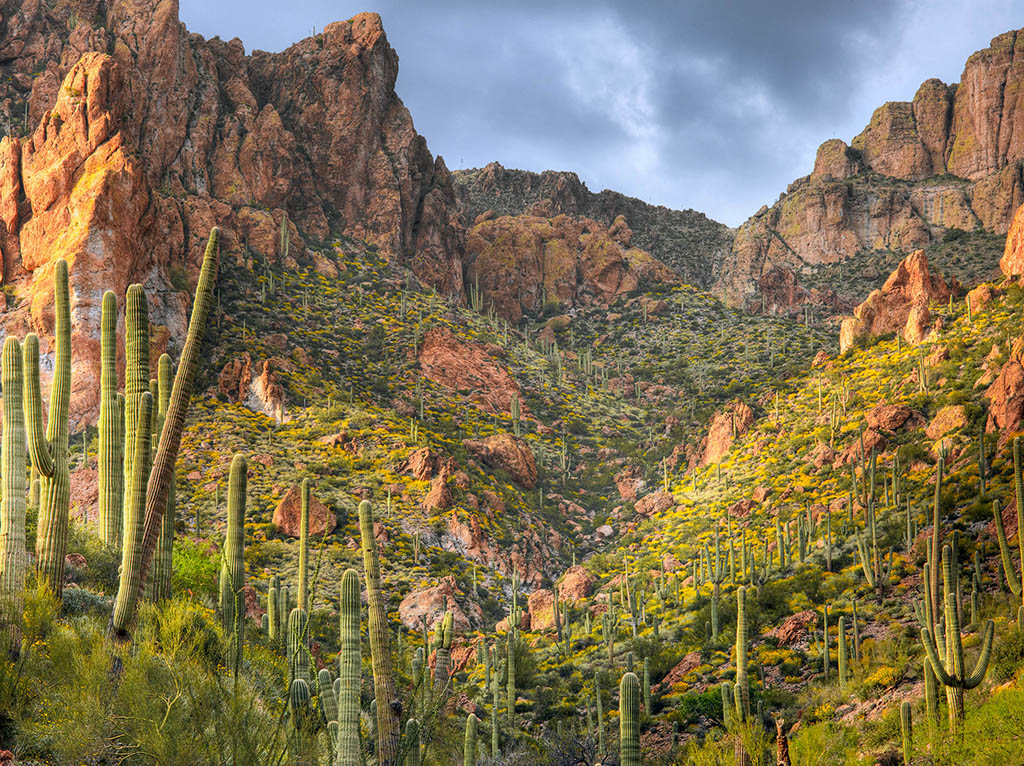
Saguaros along the Apache Trail

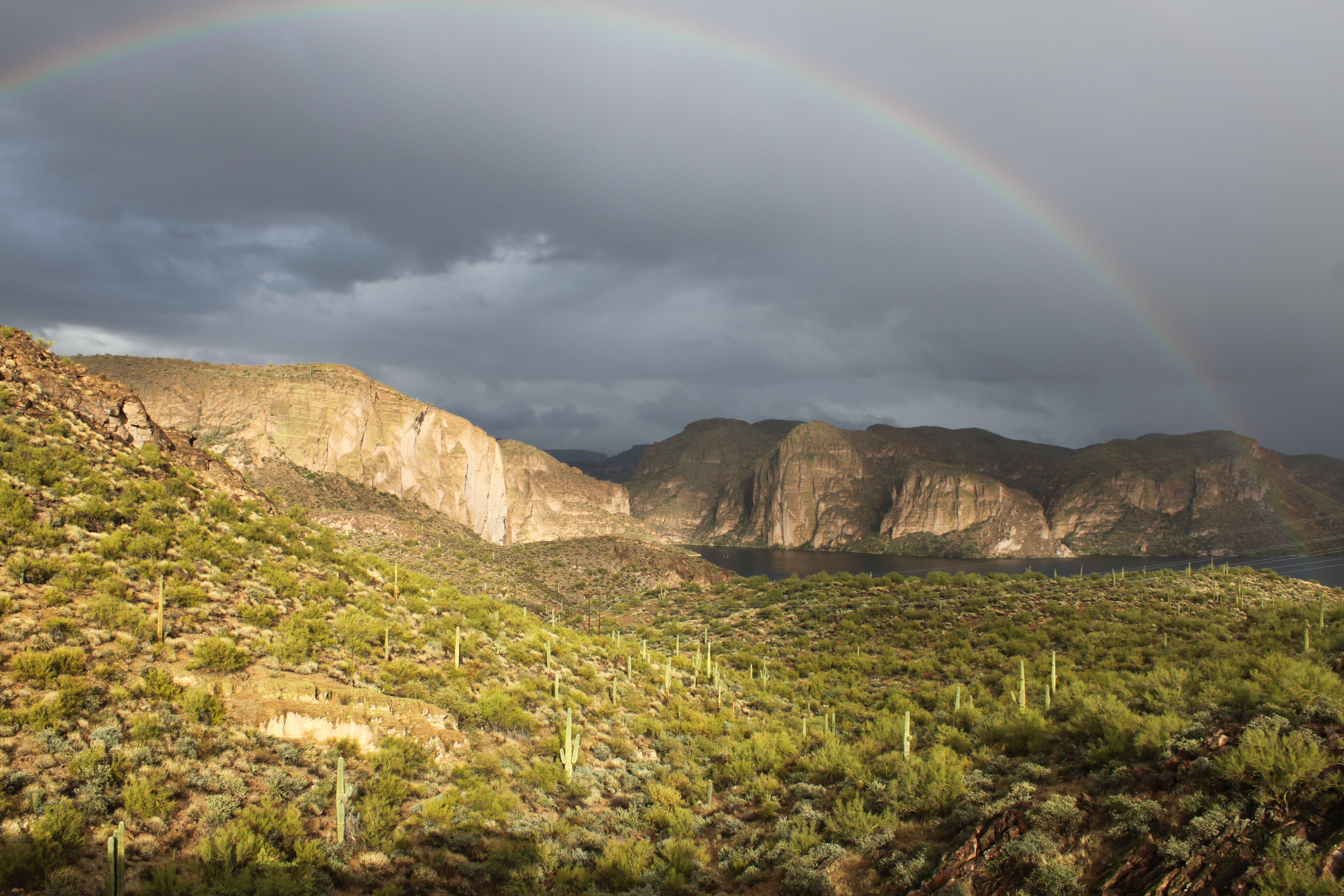
Canyon Lake and rainbow

The Apache Trail in Arizona was a stagecoach trail that ran through the Superstition Mountains. It was named the Apache Trail after the Apache Indians who originally used this trail to move through the Superstition Mountains.

The historic Apache Trail linked Apache Junction (33.4152°N 111.5807°W) at the edge of the Greater Phoenix area with Theodore Roosevelt Lake (33.6725°N 111.1531°W), through the Superstition Mountains and the Tonto National Forest.

From Apache Junction heading northeast to Tortilla Flat, the Trail - named The E. Apache Trail (Arizona State Rt 88) at this point - is paved, turning into a dirt road a few miles east of Tortilla Flat, and continuing as such for nearly the full remainder of its length. The section east of Apache Junction is known officially as State Route 88. It is also the main traffic corridor through Apache Junction, turning into Main Street as the road passes into Mesa, and regains the Apache name by becoming Apache Boulevard in Tempe, ending at Mill Avenue. Prior to the completion of the Superstition Freeway in 1992, the Apache Junction portion of the Apache Trail was part of US Highway 60, which was rerouted to the Superstition Freeway once it was completed.

The Trail winds steeply through 40 miles (64 km) of rugged desert mountains, past deep reservoir lakes like Canyon Lake and Apache Lake. The narrow, winding road is unpaved from just east of the town of Tortilla Flat to Roosevelt Dam; there are steep cliff drops and few safety barriers. The trail requires caution when driving and it is not recommended for large RVs, SUVs, or caravans. Some large RV rental companies in the US do not allow their vehicles to be taken on this route.

Fires and floods in 2019 resulted in a massive landslide between the Fish Creek Hill Overlook and Apache Lake Marina. This section of road was closed for repairs, and reopened in September 2024.

== History ==
Development of the Salt River Valley began after the Civil War, when the United States federal government desired to settle territories in the West. Accordingly, surveying in the Salt River Valley in the Arizona Territory revealed the potential for irrigation-based frontier settlements. The initial settlement, Phoenix, grew slowly, but as the irrigation system along the Salt River expanded, new settlements developed in the valley, which included Tempe and Mesa in the east and the towns of Alhambra, Peoria, and Glendale in the northwest.

However, the major challenge to the valley's continued agricultural and economic growth was the temperamental Salt River. Its flow was erratic with both droughts and floods straining the farmers. There was a clear need for the reliable delivery of water. Reclamation projects, such as building a storage dam, would not only accumulate and provide enough water for the farmers during a drought, but also decrease the likelihood of disastrous floods during the wet periods.

== The National Reclamation Act of 1902 ==
In the late 1890s, the valley experienced its worst drought since the Civil War. As a result, citizens in the Arizona Territory, along with their counterparts in the surrounding areas of the West, realized the urgent need for reclamation projects. Furthermore, this devastating drought showcased the need for greater government involvement in these water management projects that would reclaim the arid lands of the West. Due to pressure from publications, irrigation organizations, and lobby campaigns, both the Republican and Democratic platforms in the presidential election of 1900 prioritized pro-irrigation and pro-reclamation as their central plank. As a result, on June 17, 1902, the National Reclamation Act was signed into law by President Theodore Roosevelt. This act authorized the development and funding of large-scale water projects to harness and manage the water in the West.

== The Theodore Roosevelt Dam ==
One of the first federal projects undertaken by the National Reclamation Act was the construction of the Theodore Roosevelt Dam in Arizona, which would provide the vital water supply and hydroelectric power to promote the growth of the Phoenix metropolitan area. Although the remote site of this future dam proved to be a logistical nightmare, the solution to this problem was the construction of the Apache Trail. Thus, the Apache Trail served as the critical supply road, facilitating the transport of materials and equipment to the dam site.

== Building the Apache Trail ==
Construction of the Apache Trail (known as the Tonto Wagon Road at that time) began on August 29, 1903. The route of this supply road followed the ancient footpath that is believed to have been used by the Anasazi tribes to trade with the Hohokam. Other Native American tribes may have also used this footpath during prehistoric times as a migratory route between their summer and winter homes.

Apache Indians provided most of the labor for this road construction and they lived separately from the other crews. These Apache workmen often brought their wives and children to live with them and maintained their traditional way of life. The Apache Trail, originally running from the Mesa railhead to the dam site, was completed on September 3, 1905, at a cost of $551,000.

== Evolution of the Apache Trail ==
After the completion of the Apache Trail in 1905, the character of this road began to change. While this road continued to serve as a supply route for the Theodore Roosevelt Dam, the Apache Trail soon opened up for public use. Several entrepreneurs began to provide transportation services along this road, which included both stagecoach and automobile excursions. These entrepreneurs recognized the unspoiled and spectacular landscape surrounding this road and marketed its appeal as a popular tourist destination. Southern Pacific Railroad was one of the first companies to benefit from the scenic beauty of this road. They offered the famous "Sunset Route", which was their "New Orleans to San Francisco" train route that included a motorcar side trip over the Apache Trail for an additional fee. Of note, it was the Southern Pacific Railway Company who coined the name "Apache Trail" in their advertising campaigns in order to promote these automobile side tours of the Theodore Roosevelt Dam and the Apache Trail. This name has been used for this road ever since.

== Sources and external links ==
- U.S. Department of Transportation Apache Trail Historic Road. America's Byways.
- Scenic drive: Apache Trail from the Arizona Republic, Jun. 14, 2006.
- The American West Travelogue
