= Apache Wells, Arizona =

- Populated place
- Location of Apache Wells in Arizona
- Coordinates: 33°27′34″N 111°42′39″W
- Country: United States
- State: Arizona
- County: Maricopa
- Established: 1962

Area
  - Total: 1 sq mi (2.6 km^{2})
- Elevation: 1,427 ft (435 m)
- Time zone: UTC-7 (Mountain (MST))
  - Summer (DST): UTC-7 (MST)
- ZIP codes: 85205
- Area code: 480
- FIPS code: 04-02900
- GNIS feature ID: 36924

Apache Wells is the name of both fictional and real locations in southern Arizona.

== Fictional Apache Wells ==
In fiction, particularly in Western movies, "Apache Wells" is a common name for a fictional location in the Old West, generally a remote stagecoach way station, typically in southern Arizona. It first came into conspicuous public use in John Ford's classic 1939 western movie Stagecoach, the film that elevated John Wayne to stardom. (The film also had remakes in 1966 and 1986).

Subsequent westerns set partly, or chiefly, in or around the fictional "Apache Wells" have included:

- Duel at Apache Wells (1957)
- Apache Territory (1958),
- Convict Stage (1965),
- Rampage at Apache Wells (1966),
- 40 Guns to Apache Pass (1967),
- 3 Godfathers (1948),
- Zachariah (1971)

At the time that the fictional "Apache Wells" first came into use, there was not any actual town of Apache Wells in Arizona, but there were two small, remote settlements in southern Arizona with closely related names: Apache Junction, and Desert Wells — both of which had existed since the 1800s, when they had been sites of stagecoach way stations.

== Real Apache Wells ==
Today, Apache Wells is a populated place and retirement community situated within the boundaries of the city of Mesa (a major suburb of Phoenix, part of the Phoenix Metropolitan Area) in Maricopa County, in the state of Arizona, in the United States. Apache Wells was established in 1962 and developed by the Hughes family. It has an estimated elevation of 1,427 feet (435 m) above sea level, and is approximately one square mile in size.
