= Tortilla Flat, Arizona =

Unincorporated community in the state of Arizona, United States

- Unincorporated community
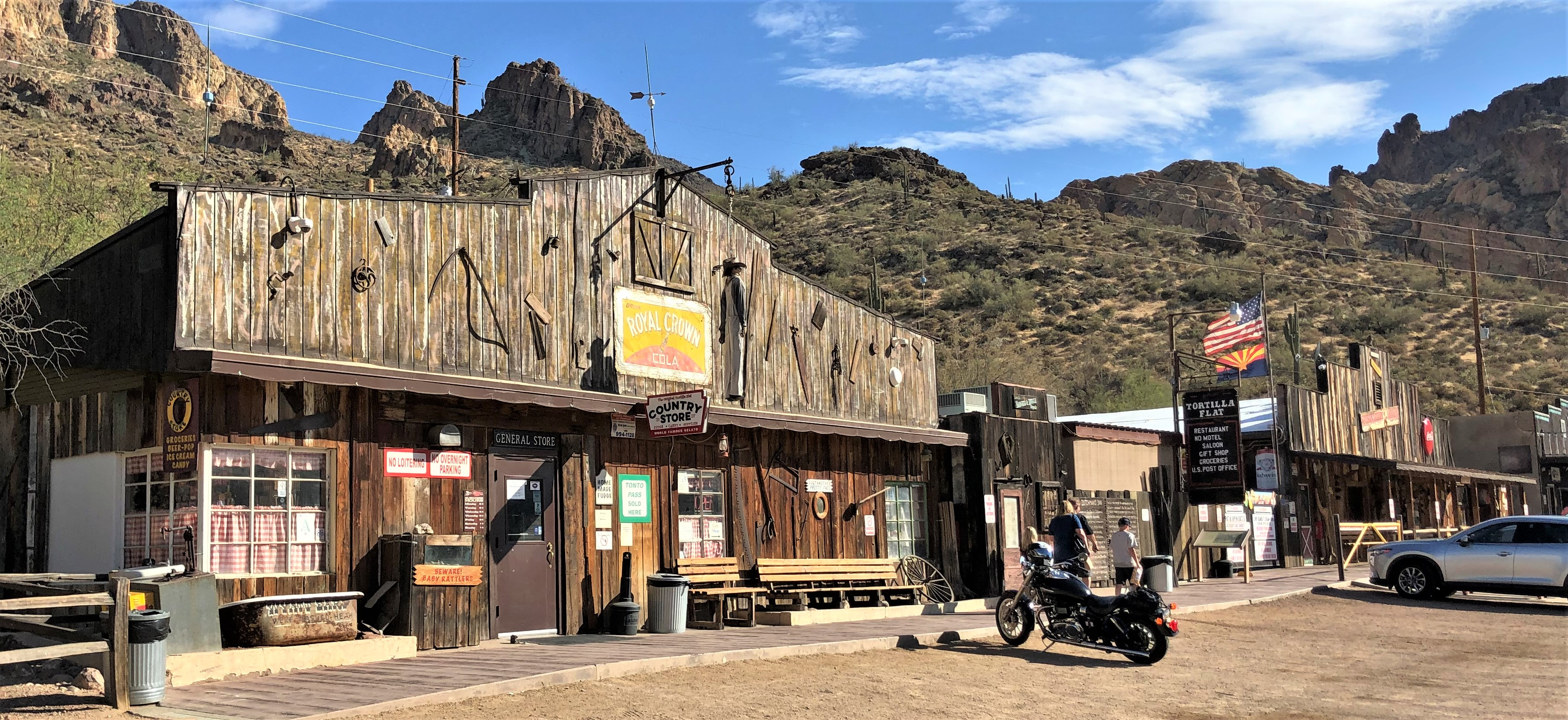
- The Country Store and the Superstition Saloon (2021)

- Location in Maricopa County and the state of Arizona
- Coordinates: 33°31′35″N 111°23′23″W
- Country: United States
- State: Arizona
- County: Maricopa
- Elevation: 1,750 ft (530 m)

Population (2020)
  - Total: 6
- Time zone: UTC-7 (Mountain (MST))
- ZIP codes: 85190

Tortilla Flat is a small unincorporated community in far eastern Maricopa County, Arizona, United States. It is located in the central part of the state, northeast of Apache Junction. It is the last surviving stagecoach stop along the Apache Trail. According to the Gross Management Department of Arizona's main U.S. Post Office in Phoenix, Tortilla Flat is presumed to be Arizona's smallest official "community" having a U.S. Post Office and voting precinct. The town has an average population of 4. Tortilla Flat can be reached by vehicles on the Apache Trail (State Route 88), via Apache Junction.

Originally a camping ground for the prospectors who searched for gold in the Superstition Mountains in the mid-to-late 19th century, Tortilla Flat was later a freight camp for the construction of Theodore Roosevelt Dam. From this time (1904) on, Tortilla Flat has had a small (less than 100 people) but continuous population. A flood in 1942 badly damaged the town, resulting in many residents moving away.

The town is made up primarily of a country store, a saloon (bar/restaurant), a BBQ Patio that has a live band daily starting Mid November through April or until it gets too hot (over 100), a mercantile/gift shop, and a small museum. Most of these were constructed in the late 1980s after a fire consumed the existing store, restaurant and motel on the same site; the mercantile/gift shop was built in 2009.

Several hiking trails into the Superstition Mountains begin near Tortilla Flat.

== History ==
The pre-modern history of what is now Tortilla Flat indicates that the valley had a creek running through it. It was used by the Yavapai to traverse through the Superstition Mountains. That trail became known as the "Yavapai Trail" or "Tonto Trail".

The Spanish 16th-century expeditions looking for gold, specifically the "Seven Cities of Gold", inspired more modern gold prospecting in the Superstitions, including those by Don Miguel Peralta from Mexico, who, in 1847 and 1848, supposedly amassed large quantities of gold from the area. Settlers followed the prospectors, raising the need for military outposts to protect them from the increasingly hostile Native Americans, whose land was being taken. Despite the difficulty of crossing the Fish Creek Mountains and Fish Creek Canyon, the Yavapai Trail was a significant route used into the Tonto Basin, as other trails were even more difficult, and, due to its access to water and fodder, it is likely that the Tortilla Flat area became a place used to camp. It was unlikely, however, that there was a settlement there at this point in history, as none appear on old trail maps.

Based on available records, Tortilla Flat got its start because of the road construction to Roosevelt Dam in 1904. There was a need for a stagecoach stop for freight haulers on their way to the construction site at Roosevelt Dam and Tortilla Flat served that purpose. Shortly following the construction of the road, Roosevelt Dam became a big tourist attraction. At that point Tortilla Flat was a stage stop for tourists and mail carriers through the 1930s.

Tortilla Flat took its name from a nearby butte shaped like a tortilla. However, an alternative explanation is that the name was given by John Cline, a Tonto Basin pioneer, who claims to have been stranded about 1867 at this location for several days with nothing but flour to make tortillas to eat.

Records of the Forest Service indicate that when the Tonto National Forest was established in 1905, it was done because the Salt River Reclamation Project – one of the first efforts of the United States Reclamation Service – needed the Forest Service to protect the Salt River watershed for the dams and otherwise manage the land because cattle grazing had stripped it of vegetation. The freight camp established at Tortilla Flat, as well as the other camps along the road to the dam, were, therefore, on U.S. Forest Service land. Those who wanted to make Tortilla Flat their permanent residence kept up the lease on the land in later years whenever it came due.

== Gallery ==
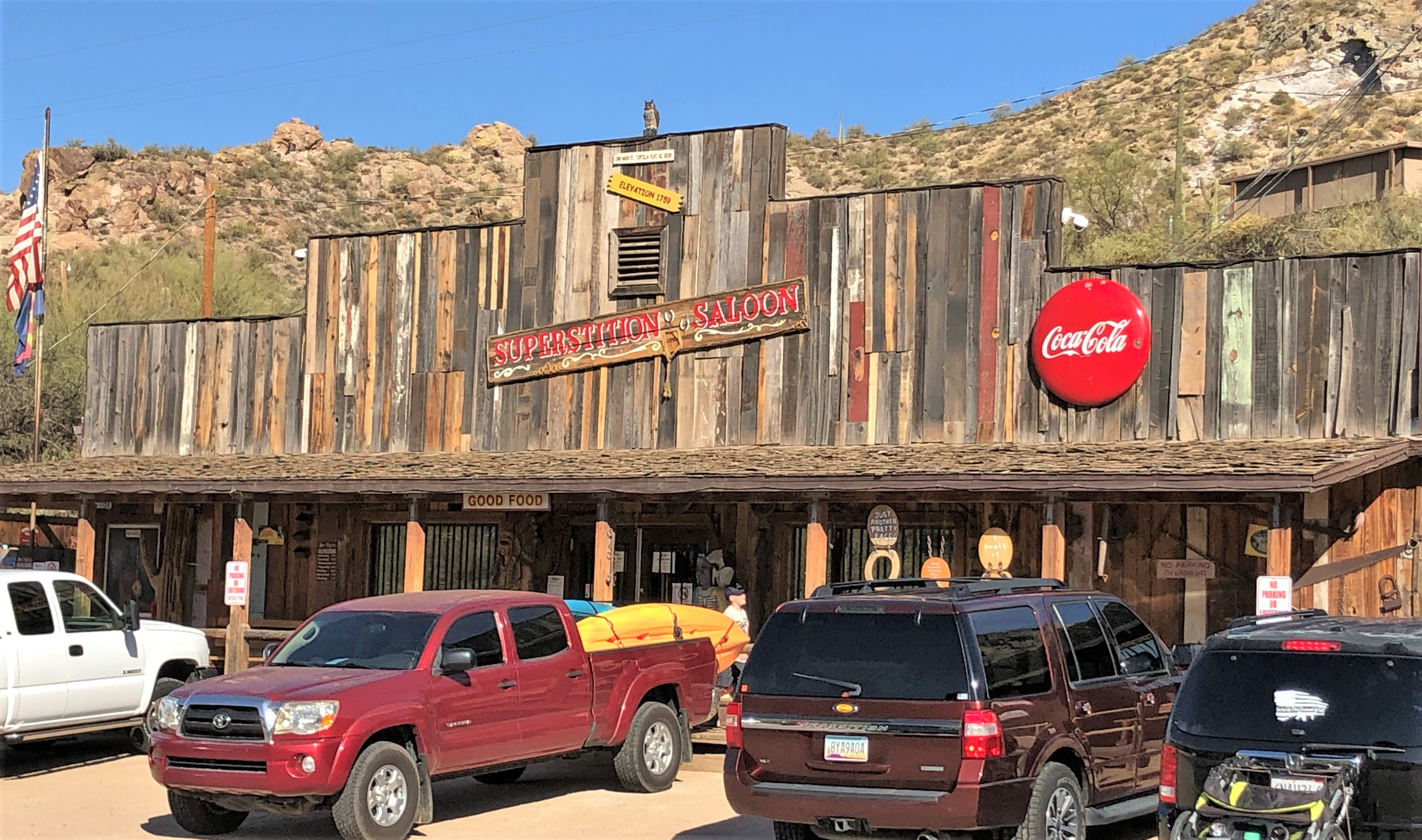
The Superstition Saloon

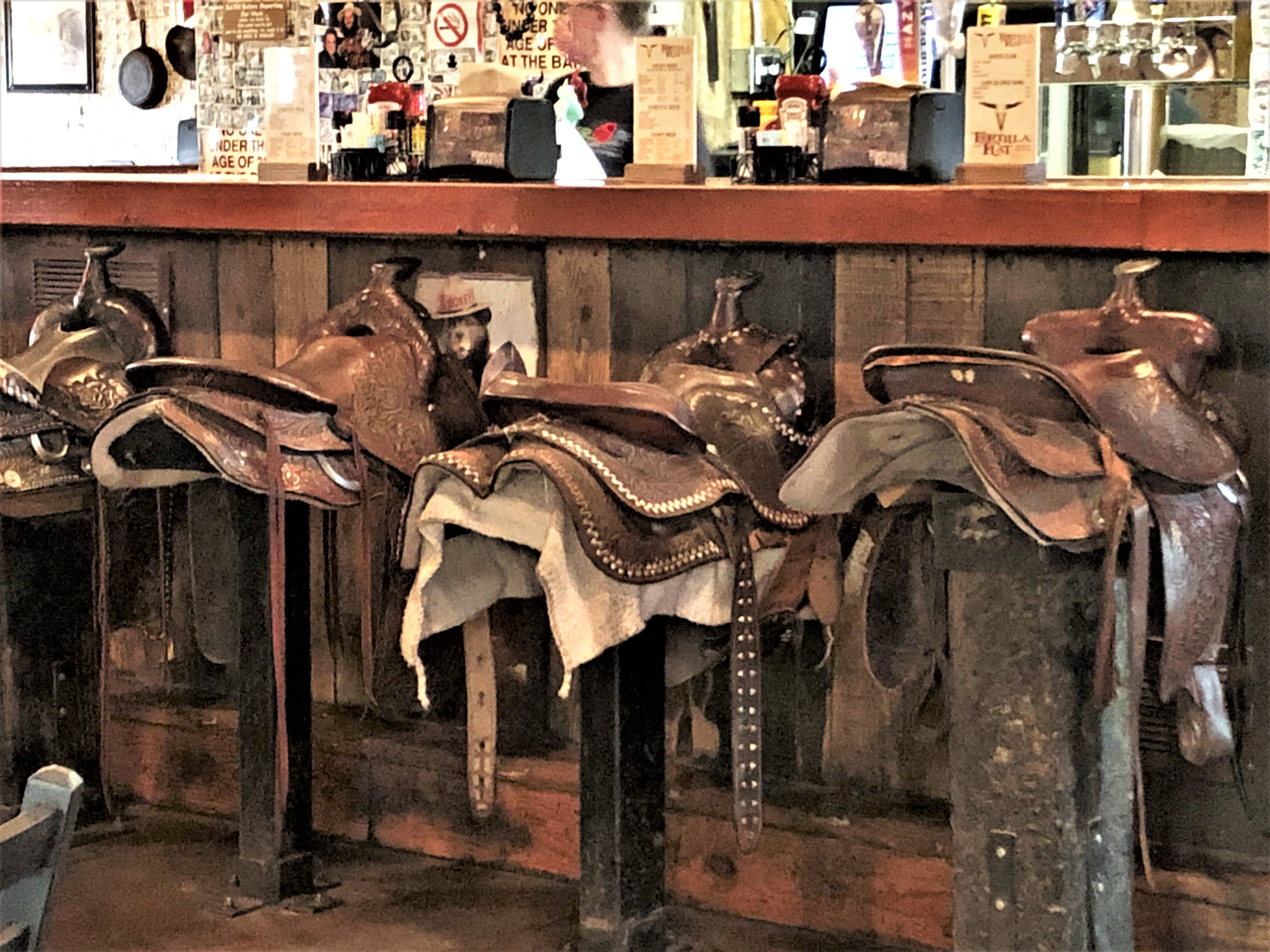
The bar in the Saloon has stools with saddles on them.

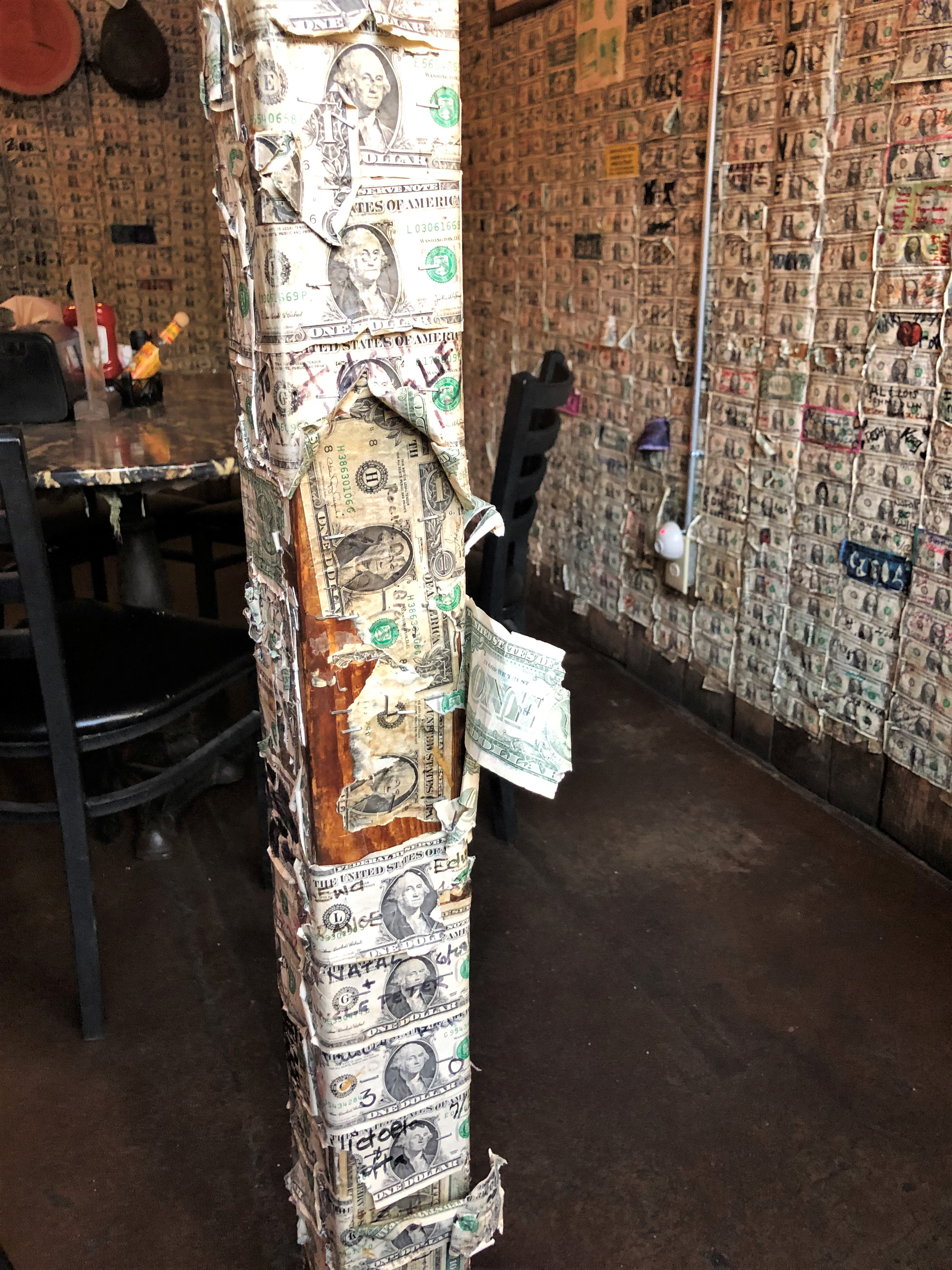
The walls of the Saloon are papered with dollar bills.

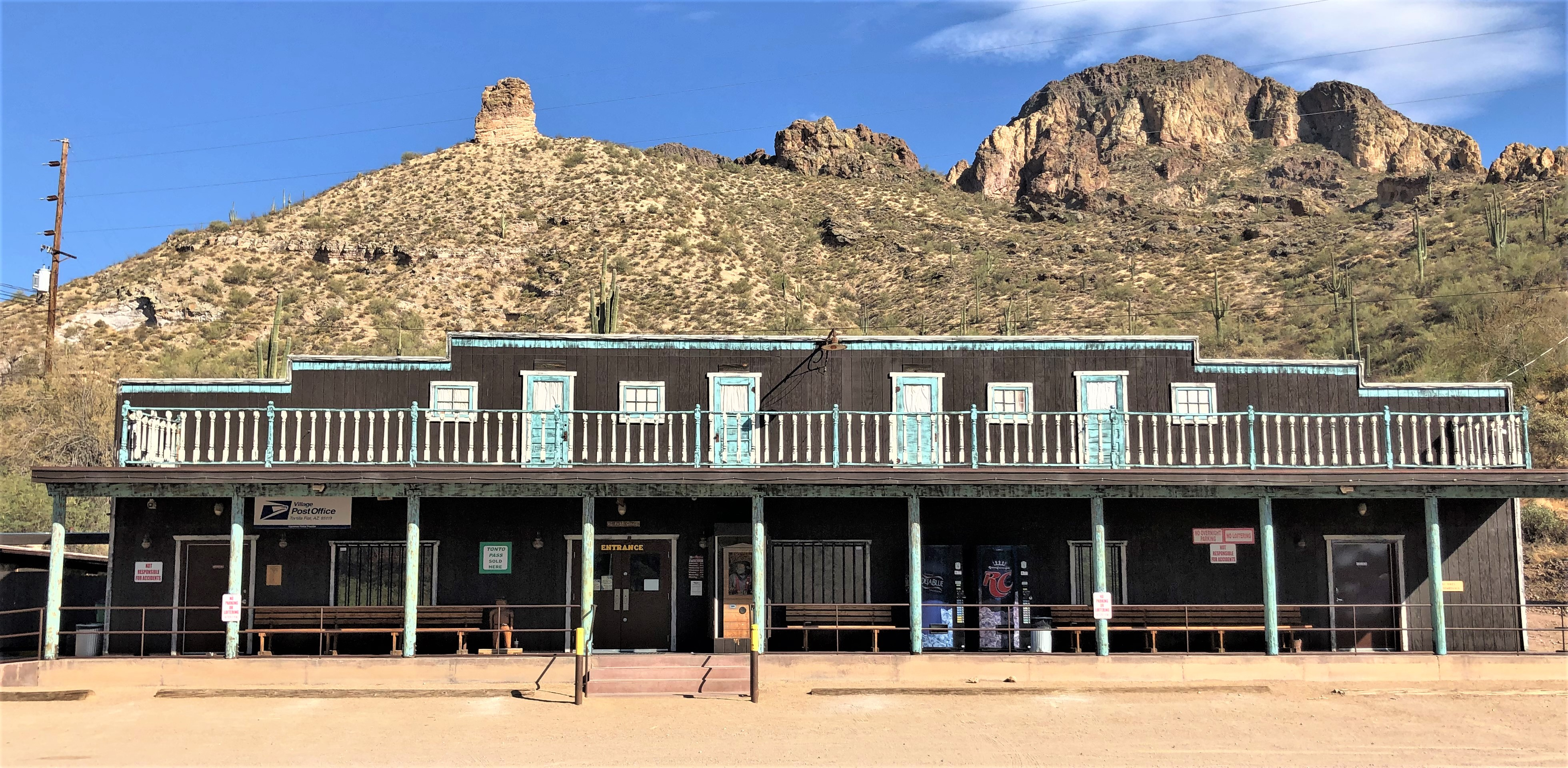
The Mercantile/Gift Shop with some of the rock formations of the area in the background

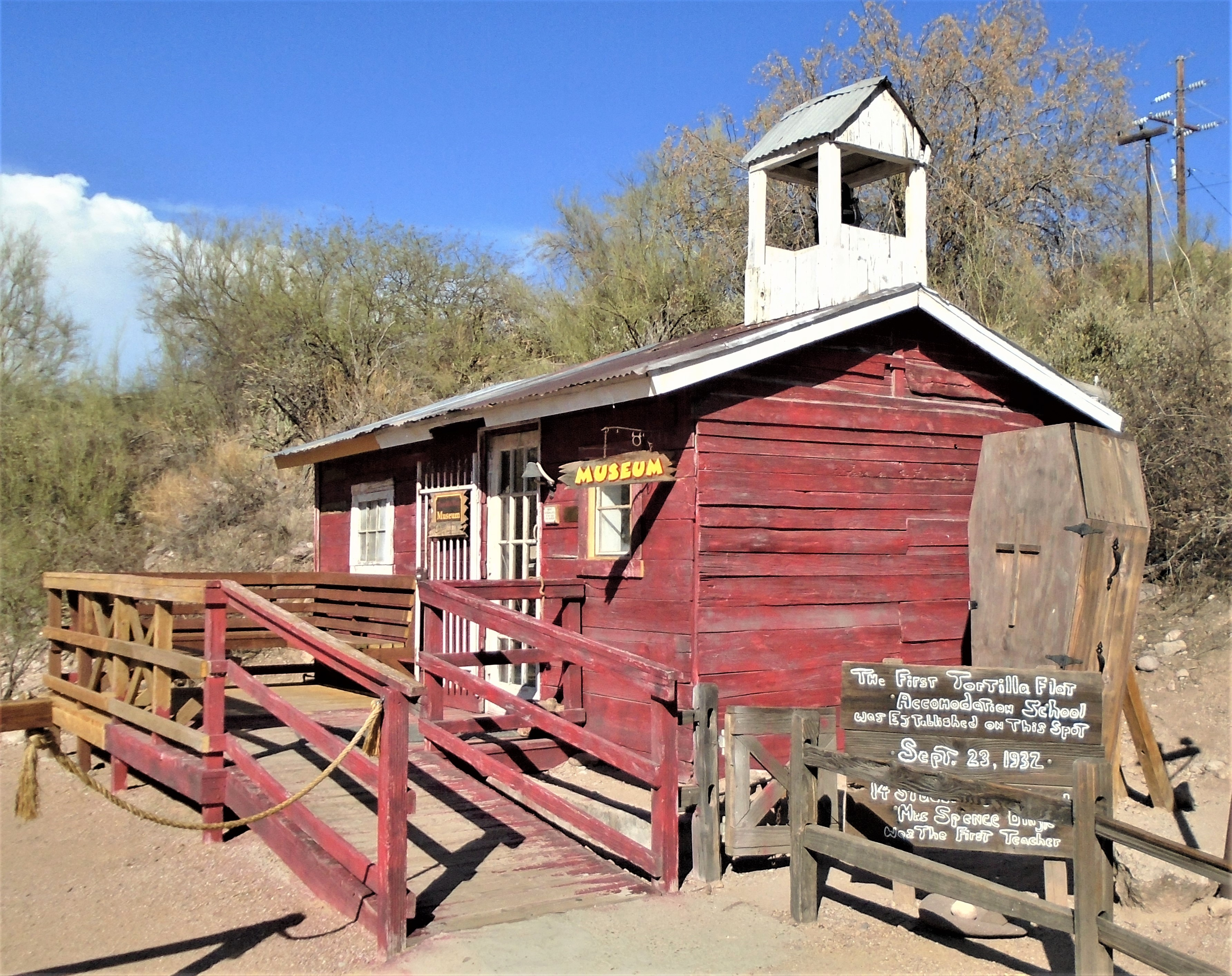
The town's museum is a replica schoolhouse on the site where the first school opened in 1932.

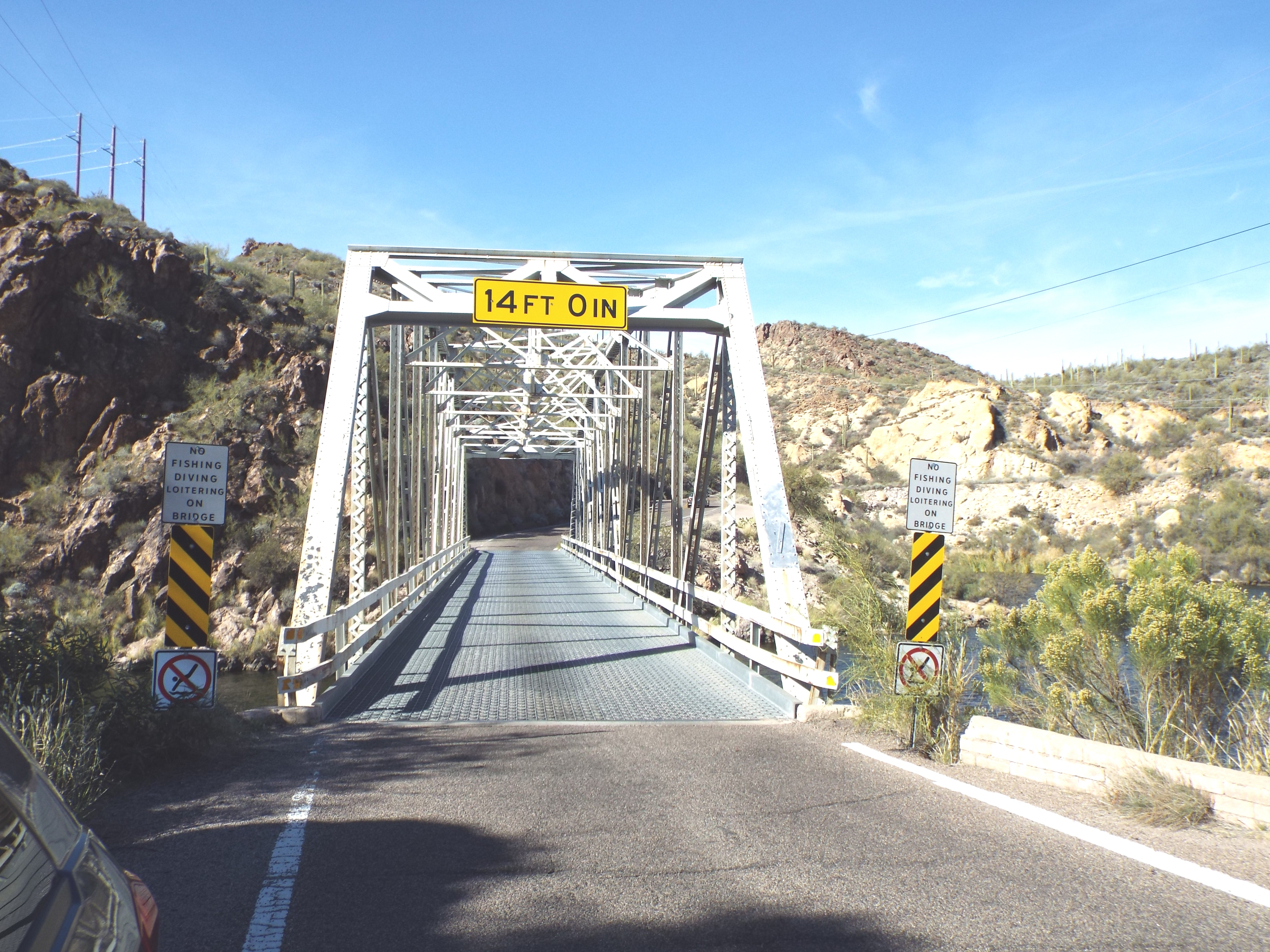
Mormon Flat Bridge, built in 1924 and located on the Apache Trail (State Route 88) over Willow Creek, 3.8 miles west of Tortilla Flat, was listed in the National Register of Historic Places (NRHP) on September 30, 1988 (#88001598).

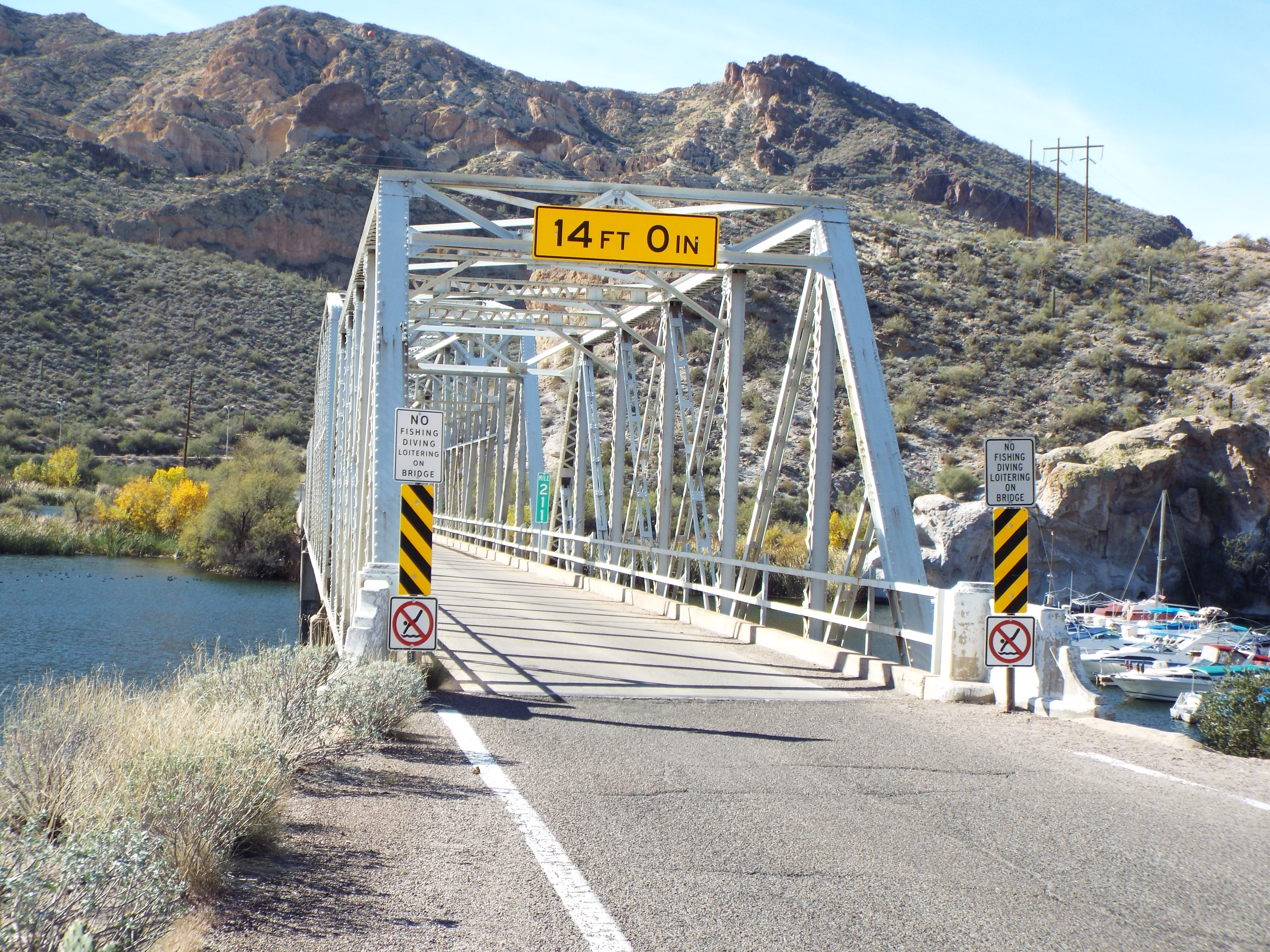
Boulder Creek Bridge, built in 1937 and located on the Apache Trail over Boulder Creek, 1 mile west of Tortilla Flat, was listed in the NRHP on March 31, 1989 (#8800159).
