= Apache Lake =

Reservoir in the Salt River

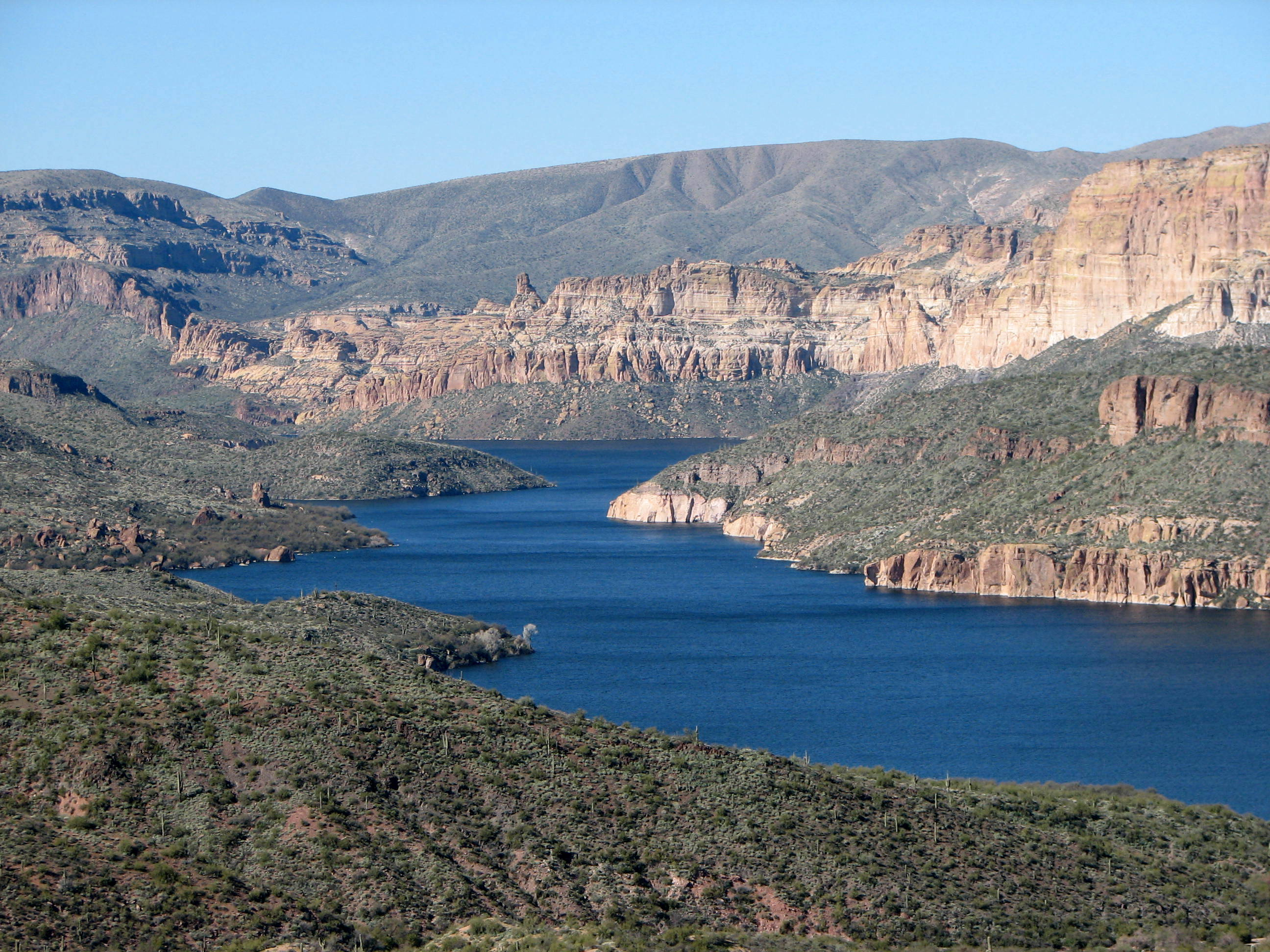

- Location within Arizona Location within the United States
- Location: Maricopa / Gila counties, Arizona
- Coordinates: 33°34′43″N 111°15′48″W
- Type: reservoir
- Primary inflows: Salt River
- Primary outflows: Salt River
- Basin countries: United States
- Managing agency: Salt River Project
- Surface area: 2,568 acres (1,039 ha)
- Average depth: 240 ft (73 m)
- Water volume: 254,138 acre⋅ft (313,475,000 m^{3})
- Surface elevation: 1,900 ft (580 m)
- Settlements: Tortilla Flat, Arizona

Apache Lake is one of four reservoirs built along the Salt River in central Arizona as part of the Salt River Project.

== Geography ==
The lake is located along the Apache Trail and about 16 miles east of Tortilla Flat, in Maricopa County, Arizona. It is about 65 miles (104 km) northeast of Phoenix.

Apache Lake is formed by Horse Mesa Dam impounded the Salt River, which was completed in 1927. The second largest of the four Salt River Project reservoirs, Apache Lake is located about 5 miles (8 km) downstream from Theodore Roosevelt Lake (the largest), and upstream from Canyon Lake and Saguaro Lake.

The surface area of the lake is 2,568 acres (1,039 ha) at full capacity and it can store 254,138 acre⋅ft (313,475,000 m^{3}) of water.

== Recreation ==
Apache Lake is a popular recreation destination within the Tonto National Forest, which is the authority that manages the facilities located at the lake. The lake is located along the Apache Trail and a number of other hiking trails can be found in the area. Situated along Apache Lake is Apache Lake Marina and Resort, which offers visitors various amenities. The resort includes 3 motels, an RV park, a gas dock house, a restaurant and bar, wet and dry boat storage slips, and a general store. Apache Lake Marina and Resort is the only development along Apache Lake that offers motel rooms and campgrounds with full hook ups.

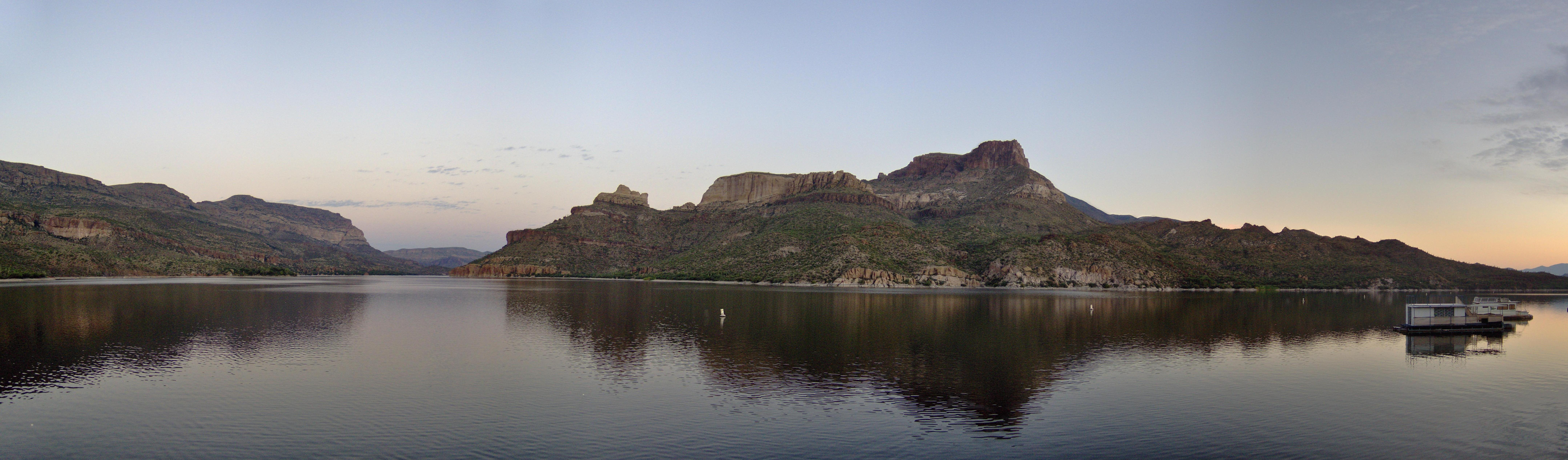
Dawn At Apache Lake

Many species of fish can be found in the lake, including largemouth, smallmouth and yellow bass, crappie, sunfish, both channel and flathead catfish, walleye and carp.

2022 fish kill has been caused by golden algae.

Tonto National Monument, with ancient cliff dwellings, is located 4 miles (6.4 km) south of the reservoir.

== See also ==
- Superstition Mountains
- Tonto National Forest
