= Apache Junction, Arizona =

- City
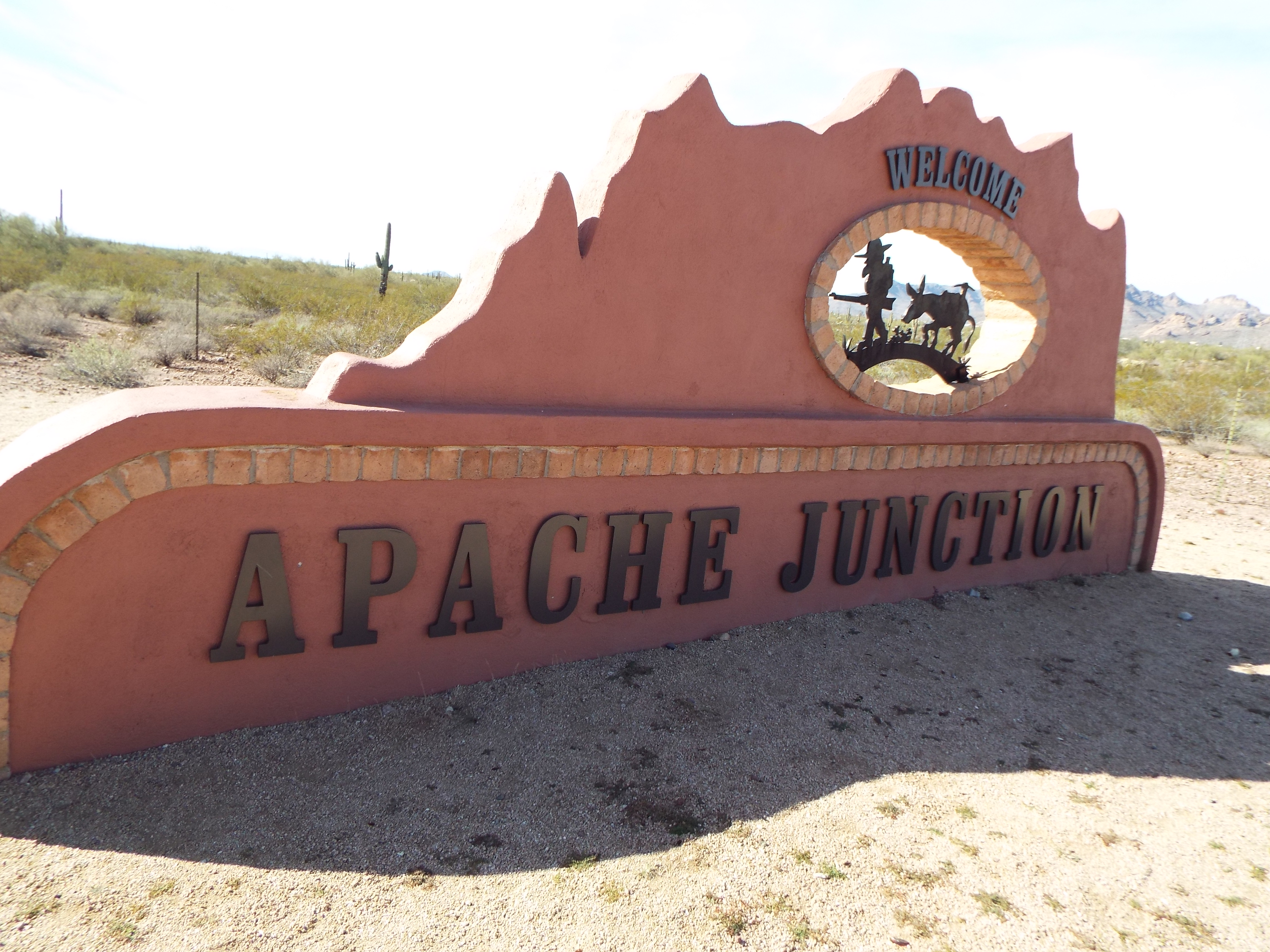
- Welcome marker

- Flag Seal Logo
- Motto: "Surrounded by Legends"
- Location in Pinal and Maricopa counties, Arizona

- Location within Arizona Location within the United States
- Coordinates: 33°23′55″N 111°32′06″W
- Country: United States
- State: Arizona
- Counties: Pinal; Maricopa
- Incorporated: November 24, 1978

Government
  - Type: Council–manager
  - Mayor: Chip Wilson

Area
  - Total: 35.08 sq mi (90.86 km^{2})
  - Land: 35.07 sq mi (90.83 km^{2})
  - Water: 0.012 sq mi (0.03 km^{2})
- Elevation: 1,700 ft (520 m)

Population (2020)
  - Total: 38,499
  - Density: 1,097.8/sq mi (423.86/km^{2})
- Time zone: UTC-7 (MST (no daylight saving time))
- ZIP codes: 85117–85120 & 85178
- Area code: 480
- FIPS code: 04-02830
- GNIS feature ID: 2409718
- Website: www.apachejunctionaz.gov

Apache Junction (Western Apache: Hagosgeed) is a city in Pinal and Maricopa counties, Arizona, United States. As of the 2020 census, the population was 38,499, most of whom lived in Pinal County. It is named for the junction of the Apache Trail and the Old West Highway. The area where Apache Junction is located used to be known as Youngberg. Superstition Mountain, the westernmost peak of the Superstition Mountains, is to the east.

== History ==
The location became a historical landmark. It is part of a scenic byway that was opened to the public in 1922 and is currently part of a 120-mile-long (190 km) "circle trail" that begins and ends in Apache Junction. The O'odham Jeweḍ, Akimel O'odham (Upper Pima), and Hohokam people all have tribal ties to the area.

== Geography ==
Apache Junction is in northern Pinal County at 33°24′54″N 111°32′46″W. A small portion of the city limits comprising the El Dorado Mobile Estates Resort and Senior Cottages of Apache Junction extends west into Maricopa County. The city is bordered to the west partly by the city of Mesa and to the southeast by unincorporated Gold Canyon. Downtown Phoenix is 33 miles (53 km) to the west via U.S. Route 60, which also leads east 54 miles (87 km) to Globe. Arizona State Route 88, following the route of the old Apache Trail, leads northeast from Apache Junction through the Superstition Mountains 45 miles (72 km) to State Route 188 at Theodore Roosevelt Lake.

Apache Junction is located in the east part of the Phoenix-Mesa-Chandler Metropolitan Area.

According to the United States Census Bureau, the city has an area of 35.1 square miles (91 km^{2}), of which 0.01 square miles (0.03 km^{2}), or 0.03%, were listed as water.

The town is bounded to the east by the Superstition Mountains (a federal wilderness area and home of the Lost Dutchman's Gold Mine) and to the north by the Goldfield Mountains with the Bulldog Recreation Area. Goldfield Ghost Town, a tourist location preserved from former prospecting days, lies near the western face of Superstition Mountain just off Highway 88 (Apache Trail). It is located just southwest of the site of the ghost town of Goldfield.

In October 2021, Apache Junction annexed ten square miles south of the city's previous southern boundary.

=== Climate ===
According to the Köppen Climate Classification system and being located in the Sonoran Desert, Apache Junction has a hot semi-arid climate, abbreviated "BSh" on climate maps. The hottest temperature recorded in Apache Junction was 119 °F (48.3 °C) on June 26, 1990, and July 27–28, 1995, while the coldest temperature recorded was 17 °F (−8.3 °C) on January 14, 2007.

Climate data for Apache Junction, Arizona, 1991–2020 normals, extremes 1962–1979, 1987–present
Month	Jan	Feb	Mar	Apr	May	Jun	Jul	Aug	Sep	Oct	Nov	Dec	Year
Record high °F (°C)	86 (30)	89 (32)	98 (37)	103 (39)	111 (44)	119 (48)	119 (48)	116 (47)	114 (46)	109 (43)	95 (35)	82 (28)	119 (48)
Mean maximum °F (°C)	75.6 (24.2)	80.2 (26.8)	88.1 (31.2)	96.5 (35.8)	103.6 (39.8)	111.0 (43.9)	112.1 (44.5)	110.8 (43.8)	106.8 (41.6)	99.6 (37.6)	87.0 (30.6)	76.2 (24.6)	113.5 (45.3)
Mean daily maximum °F (°C)	66.7 (19.3)	70.1 (21.2)	77.1 (25.1)	84.7 (29.3)	93.4 (34.1)	103.0 (39.4)	105.2 (40.7)	103.8 (39.9)	99.2 (37.3)	88.4 (31.3)	75.6 (24.2)	65.6 (18.7)	86.1 (30.0)
Daily mean °F (°C)	54.7 (12.6)	57.0 (13.9)	62.4 (16.9)	68.6 (20.3)	76.9 (24.9)	86.0 (30.0)	91.1 (32.8)	90.1 (32.3)	85.2 (29.6)	74.2 (23.4)	62.7 (17.1)	53.9 (12.2)	71.9 (22.2)
Mean daily minimum °F (°C)	42.8 (6.0)	43.9 (6.6)	47.6 (8.7)	52.6 (11.4)	60.4 (15.8)	69.1 (20.6)	77.0 (25.0)	76.4 (24.7)	71.2 (21.8)	60.1 (15.6)	49.8 (9.9)	42.2 (5.7)	57.8 (14.3)
Mean minimum °F (°C)	29.8 (−1.2)	31.0 (−0.6)	35.4 (1.9)	40.2 (4.6)	48.6 (9.2)	58.0 (14.4)	67.7 (19.8)	68.0 (20.0)	59.4 (15.2)	45.7 (7.6)	34.0 (1.1)	28.6 (−1.9)	26.0 (−3.3)
Record low °F (°C)	17 (−8)	20 (−7)	24 (−4)	33 (1)	40 (4)	48 (9)	60 (16)	62 (17)	51 (11)	32 (0)	22 (−6)	21 (−6)	17 (−8)
Average precipitation inches (mm)	1.54 (39)	1.65 (42)	1.33 (34)	0.52 (13)	0.26 (6.6)	0.05 (1.3)	1.37 (35)	1.50 (38)	1.07 (27)	0.71 (18)	1.01 (26)	1.54 (39)	12.55 (318.9)
Average precipitation days (≥ 0.01 in)	4.5	4.7	3.6	1.9	1.7	0.8	4.3	5.6	3.5	2.7	2.9	4.2	40.4
Source 1: NOAA
Source 2: National Weather Service

== Demographics ==
Historical population
Census	Pop.	Note	%±
1970	2,390		—
1980	9,935		315.7%
1990	18,100		82.2%
2000	31,814		75.8%
2010	35,840		12.7%
2020	38,499		7.4%
2022 (est.)	40,173	▲	4.3%
U.S. Decennial Census

Apache Junction first appeared on the 1970 U.S. Census as an unincorporated village. It was formally incorporated as a city in 1978.

=== 2020 census ===
As of the 2020 census, Apache Junction had a population of 38,499.

99.6% of residents lived in urban areas, while 0.4% lived in rural areas.

The median age was 52.5 years. 17.1% of residents were under the age of 18 and 32.7% of residents were 65 years of age or older. For every 100 females there were 94.5 males, and for every 100 females age 18 and over there were 92.2 males age 18 and over.

There were 17,052 households in Apache Junction, of which 20.0% had children under the age of 18 living in them. Of all households, 43.2% were married-couple households, 20.4% were households with a male householder and no spouse or partner present, and 28.4% were households with a female householder and no spouse or partner present. About 32.7% of all households were made up of individuals and 19.5% had someone living alone who was 65 years of age or older.

There were 22,149 housing units, of which 23.0% were vacant. The homeowner vacancy rate was 1.7% and the rental vacancy rate was 11.6%.

Racial composition as of the 2020 census
Race	Number	Percent
White	31,123	80.8%
Black or African American	466	1.2%
American Indian and Alaska Native	480	1.2%
Asian	388	1.0%
Native Hawaiian and Other Pacific Islander	55	0.1%
Some other race	2,642	6.9%
Two or more races	3,345	8.7%
Hispanic or Latino (of any race)	6,647	17.3%

=== 2010 census ===
As of the census of 2010, there were 35,840 people, 15,574 households, and 9,372 families residing in the city. The population density was 929.3 inhabitants per square mile (358.8/km^{2}). There were 22,771 housing units at an average density of 665.1 per square mile (256.8/km^{2}). The racial makeup of the city was 89.5% White, 1.2% Black or African American, 1.1% Native American, 0.8% Asian, 0.1% Pacific Islander, 4.9% from other races, and 2.4% from two or more races. Hispanic or Latino of any race were 14.4% of the population.

There were 15,574 households, out of which 19.6% had children under the age of 18 living with them, 44.6% were married couples living together, 10.7% had a female householder with no husband present, and 39.8% were non-families. 31.4% of all households were made up of individuals, and 15.8% had someone living alone who was 65 years of age or older. The average household size was 2.28 and the average family size was 2.85.

In the city, the population had 19.9% under the age of 20, 4.5% from 20 to 24, 20.4% from 25 to 44, 27.1% from 45 to 64, and 26.2% who were 65 years of age or older. The median age was 47.5 years.

=== 2000 census ===
The median income (as of the 2000 census) for a household in the city was $33,170, and the median income for a family was $37,726. Males had a median income of $31,283 versus $22,836 for females. The per capita income for the city was $16,806. About 7.3% of families and 11.6% of the population were below the poverty line, including 18.4% of those under age 18 and 7.4% of those age 65 or over.

== Government ==
Apache Junction was incorporated as a city on November 24, 1978. The city is governed by a collection of elected officials, clerk, and nine boards and commissions. The city council has seven members, which includes the mayor and vice-mayor. The mayor serves a two-year term. The current mayor is Chip Wilson, Vice Mayor Christa Rizzi.

== Historic structures ==
This gallery includes images of some of the remaining historical structures located in Apache Junction. Among the exhibits on the grounds of the Superstition Mountain Museum are studio sets and other Western paraphernalia that were saved from the Apacheland fire of 1969. Apacheland was a 1,800-acre movie set that opened in 1960. Also located in Apache junction is the ghost town of Goldfield. Goldfield was a mining town established in 1893 next to Superstition Mountain. When the mine vein faulted, the grade of ore dropped and the town eventually became a ghost town. The town and its historic buildings were revived as a tourist attraction.

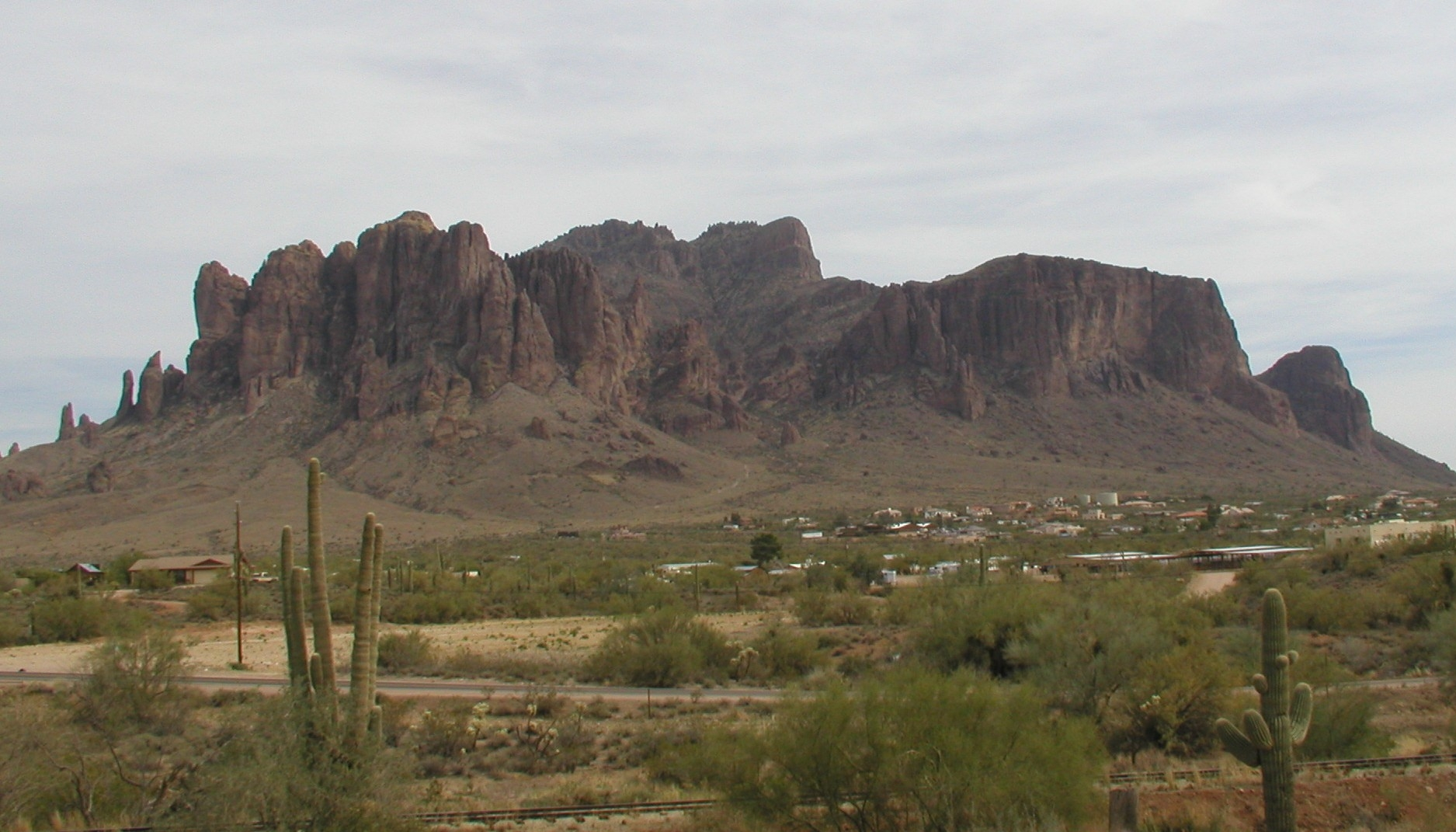
The Lost Dutchman Mine, located in the Superstition Mountains

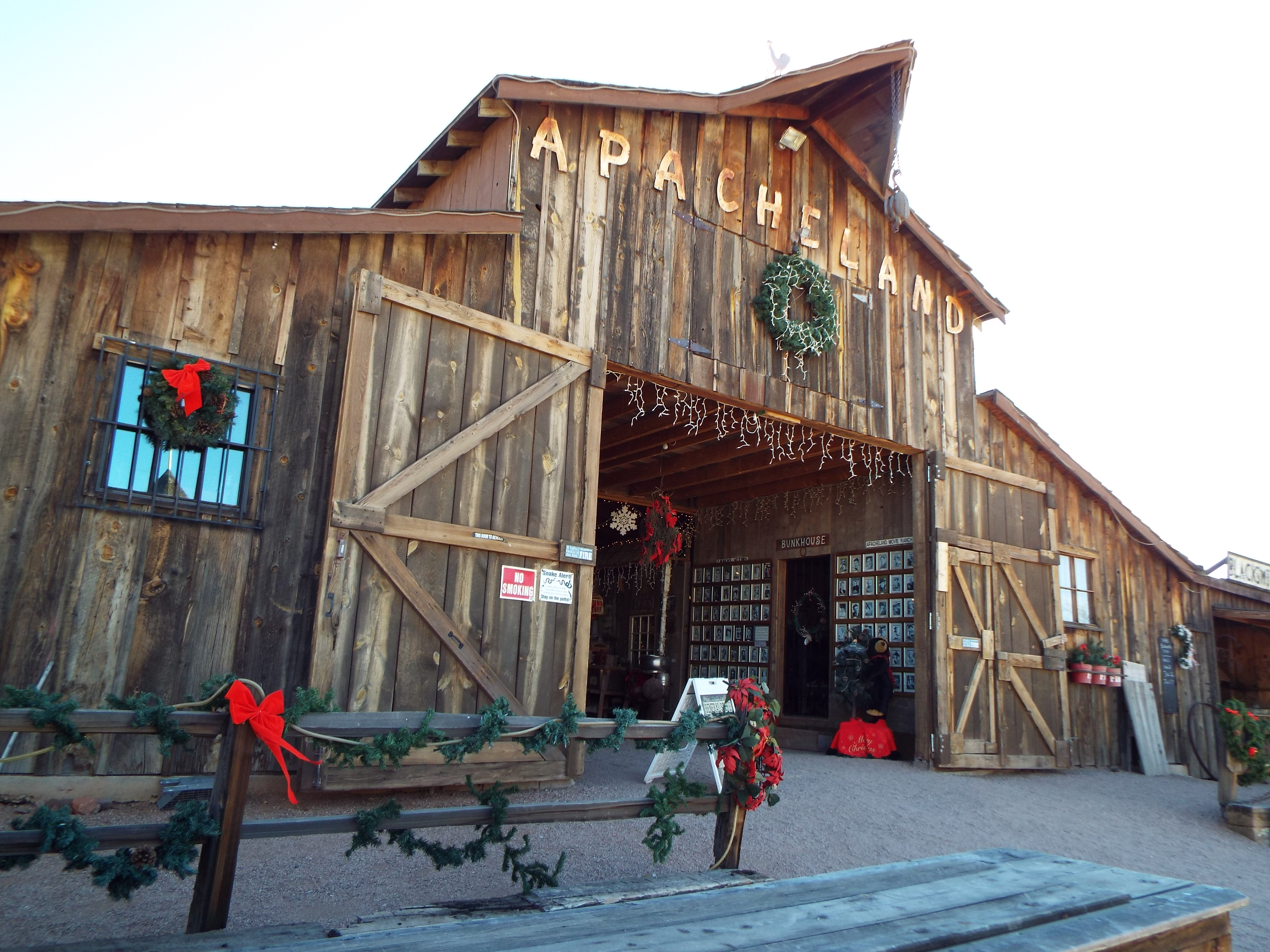
The Audie Murphy Barn on the grounds of Superstition Mountain Museum, moved there from the Apacheland Movie Ranch

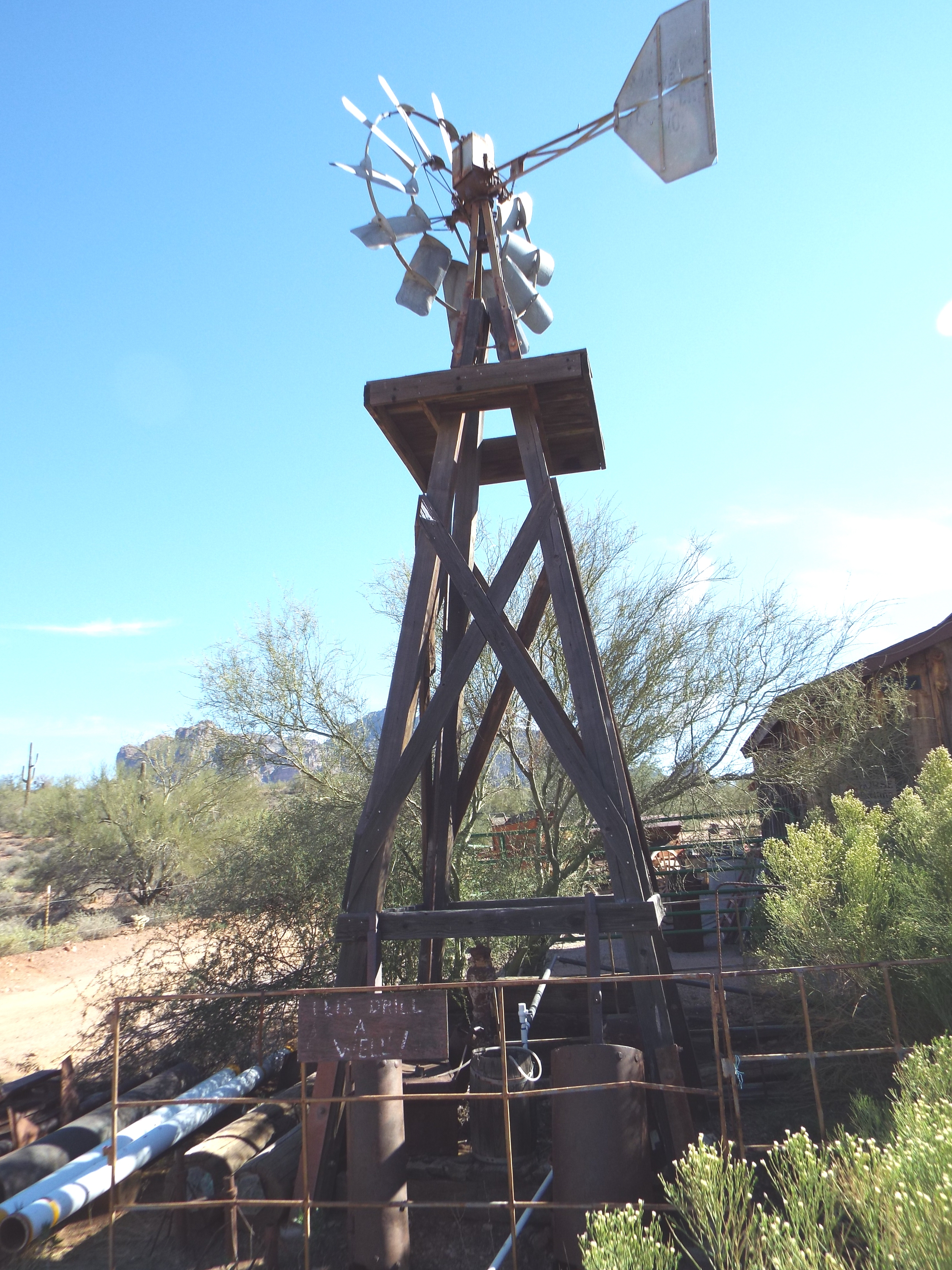
A 19th-century windmill located on the grounds of Superstition Mountain Museum

== Transportation ==
Apache Junction is located along U.S. Route 60.

Apache Junction is not served by local buses. Greyhound Lines serves Apache Junction on its Phoenix-El Paso via Globe route.

== Education ==
It is in the Apache Junction Unified School District.

== See also ==
- Apache Wells, Arizona
