= Mormon Flat Dam =

Dam on the Salt River in Arizona

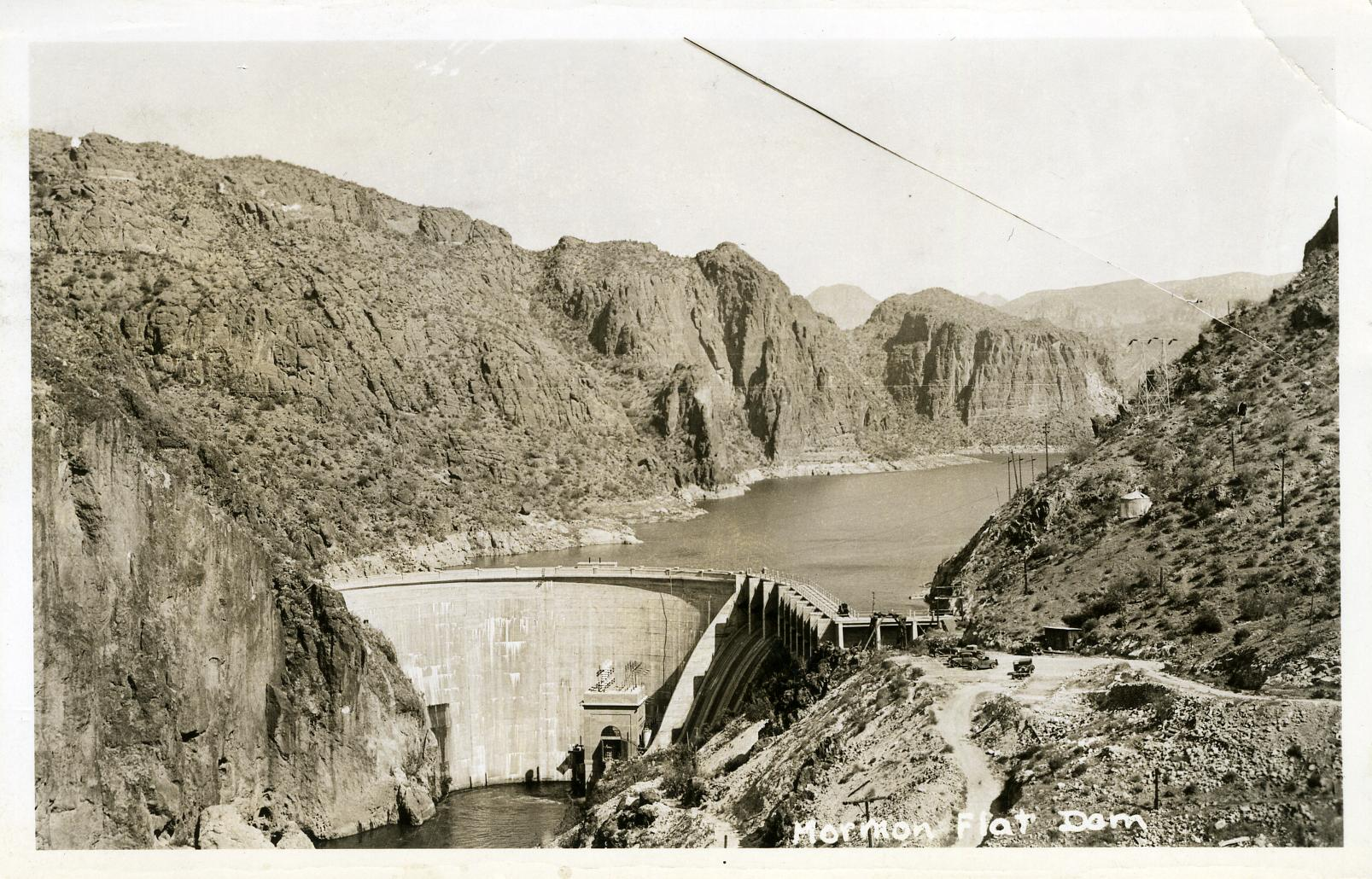
- Mormon Flat Dam c. 1935
- Interactive map of Mormon Flat Dam
- Coordinates: 33°33′15″N 111°26′33″W
- Construction began: 1923
- Opening date: 1925

The Mormon Flat Dam is a dam on the Salt River located Northeast of Phoenix, Arizona.

The dam is 380 feet long, 224 feet high and was built between 1923 and 1925. It is named after nearby Mormon Flat, a place where Latter-day Saints (Mormon) settlers from Utah stopped to camp. There are two hydroelectric generating units in the dam; rated at 10,000 and 50,000 kW. The dam forms Canyon Lake as it slows the passage of the Salt River.

The dam was listed on the National Register of Historic Places in 2017.
