= Peralta =

Peralta may refer to:

== Places ==
- Peralta, Navarre, village in the South of Navarre, Spain
- Peralta, New Mexico, village, United States
- Peralta (Mesoamerican site), pre-Columbian Mesoamerican archaeological site in the state of Guanajuato, Mexico
- Peralta Villa, Oakland, California, neighborhood of Oakland, California, United States
- The Peralta Community College District, in the East Bay, California, United States
- Peralta Rancho San Antonio, rancho in the East Bay, California, United States

== Other uses ==
- Peralta (surname)
- Peralta (ferry), a 1930s San Francisco ferry whose hull is now part of the Kalakala
- SS Peralta, a concrete oil tanker, converted to a breakwater
- Peralta land grant, a forgery created by James Reavis who claimed title to much of Arizona and New Mexico.
- Peralta Home, the first brick house built in Alameda County, San Leandro, California.
- Peralta Stones, Stone tablets that are alleged to be a map to the Lost Dutchman's Gold Mine.
- Giraffa camelopardalis peralta, the West African Giraffe
