= Superstition Mountain =

Landform in Arizona, United States

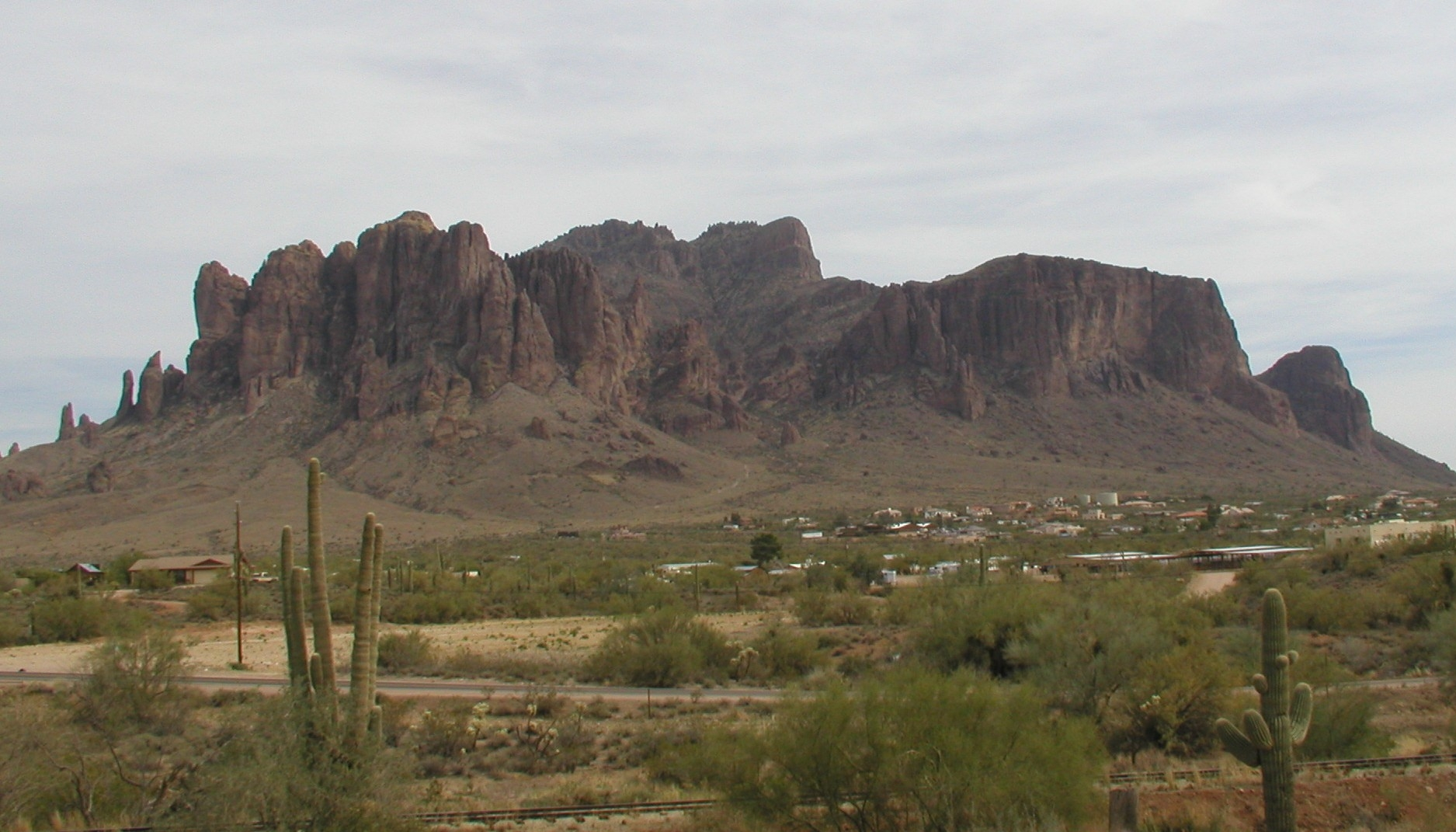
- Superstition Mountain as seen from the west over Apache Junction in 2002

Highest point
- Elevation: 5,059 ft (1,542 m) NAVD 88
- Prominence: 1,817 ft (554 m)
- Coordinates: 33°24′40″N 111°24′03″W

Naming
- Native name: Yavapai: Wi:kchsawa; O'odham: Gakoḍk

Geography
- Location within Arizona
- Location: Pinal County, Arizona, US
- Parent range: Superstition Mountains
- Topo map: USGS Goldfield

Superstition Mountain (Yavapai: Wi:kchsawa, O'odham: Gakoḍk) is a prominent mountain and regional landmark located in the Phoenix metropolitan area of Arizona, immediately east of Apache Junction and north of Gold Canyon. It anchors the west end of the Superstition Mountains (within the federally designated Superstition Wilderness Area) and is a popular outdoor recreation destination, home to numerous trails for hiking and horseback riding. The legend of the Lost Dutchman's Gold Mine centers around the mountain.

== Name ==
Apache Junction resident and Superstition Mountain historian Tom Kollenborn reported the Akimel O'odham's name for the mountain (in the Oʼodham language) was "kakatak tamai", meaning "Crooked-Top Mountain". The name "Superstition Mountains" first appears on a map produced in 1872, with the singular "Superstition Mountain" appearing on an 1874 map. A 1927 map shows both "Coronado Mountain" and "Monte de Espuma" for the mountain, while the USGS reports "Monte de la Expuma" as an alternative name. "Sierra de Espuma" is another reported name for the mountain, sometimes attributed to Francisco Vázquez de Coronado, but it is unlikely he saw the mountain.

== Human history ==
Native peoples of the Salado culture settled near the mountain, possibly as early as 1,000 AD, and constructed cliff dwellings in nearby Rogers Canyon. Sometime between 700 AD and 1,100 AD, the Hohokam people left petroglyphs in the incorrectly named Hieroglyphic Canyon. The Superstition Wilderness contains other petroglyph sites. The Pima people arrived in the region around 1,400 AD, by which point the Hohokam were no longer living there. By the time Europeans entered the region, the Yavapai also lived in the region near the mountain, and Western Apache bands conducted hit-and-run raids on settlers and travelers into the 19th century.

Marcos de Niza may have been the first European to see Superstition Mountain in 1539 during his search for the Seven Cities of Cibola. Superstition Mountain was located on the northern frontier of New Spain, and then fell within the territory of Mexico prior to the end of the Mexican–American War in 1848. The Mexican Cession moved the mountain into the United States when the border shifted south to the Gila River. By 1853, a United States War Department map of the area showed Weaver's Needle. Two minor skirmishes may have occurred around the mountain during the American Civil War. A skirmish with the Yavapai also occurred near the mountain during a campaign led by John D. Walker in 1866. The first Anglo-American settler in the wilderness was Elisha Reavis, who established a homestead and garden east of the mountain around 1878.

Gold prospecting and mining activity occurred around the mountain in the 19th and early 20th centuries. The possibly-apocryphal Peralta massacre reportedly occurred in 1848, when members of the Peralta family tried to transport gold out of the mountains before they became U.S. territory. The first mining claim in the region was the Buckhorn Claim, now known as the Palmer Mine, staked in 1886, and at least 15 gold mines were established near the mountain, including the Mammoth Mine and Bull Dog Mine. The mountain is featured in the legend of the Lost Dutchman's Gold Mine, and treasure hunters have continued to search for the mine to the present day, despite strict rules limiting prospecting and mining activity in the Superstition Wilderness Area.

Ranching in the area began with a few cattlemen moving into the area in 1872, with an organized ranch established as early as 1876 at the present-day Quarter Circle U Ranch. The first survey benchmark was placed on Superstition Peak in 1899. The Apache Trail was constructed near the western base of the mountain between 1903 and 1905, connecting Mesa to Roosevelt Dam. Apacheland Movie Ranch was built near Gold Canyon and served as the backdrop for numerous western films. The Superstition Wilderness was established in 1964, protecting much of the mountain and the range it lies within, and it was expanded to approximately 160,200 acres (64,800 ha) in 1984.

Superstition Mountain has been the site of several airplane crashes, including the 1948 crash of a World War II training aircraft on the west side of the mountain in Monument Canyon and the 2011 crash of a Rockwell Turbo Commander near the Flatiron with six fatalities. Other plane crashes have occurred in the vicinity of the mountain, such as the crash of a Fleet Aircraft biplane in 1942 or 1943 near Whiskey Spring Canyon with both occupants surviving; the aircraft was recovered in 1963 and returned to flying condition.

During the 20th and 21st centuries, the Phoenix metropolitan area has expanded to the vicinity of the mountain. In 1940, nearby Apache Junction was "nothing more than a filling station and a small zoo", but by 2019 its population was estimated at 42,571. The population of the unincorporated community of Gold Canyon located south of the mountain has grown rapidly, increasing 68.5% between the United States Census in 2000 and 2010. Both now serve as bedroom communities for the fast-growing Phoenix area.

== Geography ==
Superstition Mountain is located within the greater Superstition Mountains range 43 miles east of Phoenix, Arizona, in the fringe of the state's central mountain region. It is a prominent landmark located generally south and east of the Salt River, rising approximately 3,000 feet (910 m) above the Salt River Valley. The city of Apache Junction is located immediately to the west of the mountain, and the unincorporated community of Gold Canyon is located to the south.

The mountain has two major peaks, Superstition Peak or Peak 5057 (elevation recorded as 5,059 feet (1,542 m) using NAVD 88, but formerly recorded as 5,057 feet (1,541 m)) near Hieroglyphic Canyon and Peak 5024 (5,024 feet (1,531 m)) above Lost Dutchman State Park near a visually prominent feature called the Flatiron. Lost Dutchman State Park is located on the western side of the mountain, as is the Goldfield ghost town in modern-day Youngberg. The northern and eastern sides of the mountain consist of very rugged terrain and wilderness. Weavers Needle, popular for rock climbing, is on the east side of the mountain.

== Geology ==
The mountain was formed by a series of volcanic eruptions between 20.5 and 18 million years ago. The west face of the mountain is composed of dacite lava and rhyolitic tuff. The overlying tuff was deposited during an eruption which created a collapse caldera bounded by faults. Dome resurgence reactivated these faults, causing uplift of the caldera floor which juxtaposed the softer tuff and more resistant dacite. Differential weathering caused the outer tuff to erode faster, leaving the dacite cliffs exposed and creating the prominent mountain visible today.

== Climate ==
Superstition Mountain is located in a semi-arid zone, receiving between 8 inches (20 cm) and 25 inches (64 cm) of precipitation annually, depending on elevation. The average annual temperature is 72 °F (22 °C), but summer temperatures above 112 °F (44 °C) are common, with temperatures sometimes falling below freezing in winter. The North American Monsoon brings rain and thunderstorms in July and early August, with a danger of flash floods.

== Recreation ==
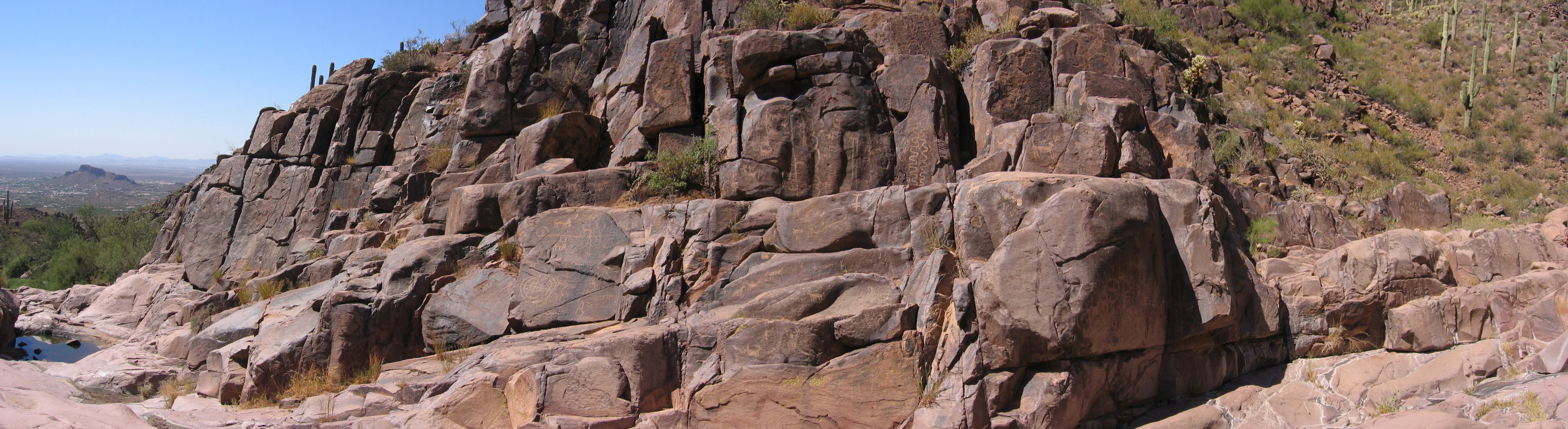
Superstition Mountain – Petroglyph Trail

The mountain has numerous trails for hiking and horseback riding, along with limited trails for mountain biking. Trailheads include the First Water Trailhead near Youngberg, several trailheads in Lost Dutchman State Park, the Tonto Trailhead and Broadway Trailhead near Apache Junction, and the Hieroglyphic Trailhead and Peralta Trailhead near Gold Canyon. The Superstition Ridgeline Trail follows the contour of the top of the mountain. Mountain bikes are not permitted within the Superstition Wilderness, which protects much of the mountain.

Rock climbing is also popular on and around Superstition Mountain, with popular climbs including The Hand (also known as Praying Hands) and Crying Dinosaur along trails near Lost Dutchman State Park, as well as Weaver's Needle north of Fremont Saddle.

== Transportation ==
U.S. Route 60 and Apache Trail are two primary roads used to access Superstition Mountain.

== Notable residents ==
- Bill Mensch
