= The Dutchman's Secret =

- Story code: D 98202
- Story: Don Rosa
- Ink: Don Rosa
- Hero: Scrooge McDuck
- Pages: 24
- Layout: 4 rows per page
- Appearances: Scrooge McDuck; Donald Duck; Huey, Dewey, and Louie
- First publication: March 1, 1999

"The Dutchman's Secret" is a 1999 Donald Duck comic story by Don Rosa. It is a direct sequel to his 1998 story The Vigilante of Pizen Bluff and is one of his most historically accurate stories.

The story was first published in the Danish Anders And & Co. #1999-09; the first American publication was in Uncle Scrooge #319, in July 2003.

== Plot ==
The story begins approximately fifteen minutes after the end of The Vigilante of Pizen Bluff, where Scrooge McDuck is in his Money Bin together with Donald Duck and his grandnephews, having just finished telling them a story about his encounter with famous American Old West legends such as the Dalton Gang, Phineas T. Barnum, Buffalo Bill, Annie Oakley, and Geronimo. It's only now that Scrooge learns that the poster that was the original cause for the earlier adventure also contains a secret map leading to the Lost Dutchman's Gold Mine, one of the biggest lost treasures in the United States. Scrooge, Donald, and the boys thus set off on a new adventure to find this treasure.

The Ducks travel to the mountains of Arizona, where the lost mine is said to be located. There, they meet a shady character who presents himself as a tourist guide and map vendor. He tells the Ducks the story of the lost mine: The mine was originally discovered by an expedition created by Don Miguel Peralta, who had been given a map to the treasure as a reward for funding the repairs of the Jesuit church of Arizpe, but because of an Apache ambush, only one man, Gonzales Peralta, survived the expedition. He left markings on the ground leading to the treasure, which Jacob Waltz then marked in his map, which now belongs to Scrooge.

The Ducks start on an expedition to follow Waltz's map and find the treasure. However, right at the start, the map is accidentally destroyed, so the Ducks have to use their own intelligence to decipher Peralta's markings and find the treasure. They eventually succeed, but the shady tourist guide has followed them, and traps them in the mine, intent on claiming the entire mine for himself. Eventually, the Ducks manage to escape and get back to town, where the robber has already been arrested, thanks to Scrooge's clever advance planning. However, Scrooge has no legal claim to the treasure, as it has all along been the property of the Native American Pima tribe, so Scrooge has to render it to their possession - receiving ten million dollars as a reward.

== Notes ==
This is one of Rosa's most historically accurate stories. Jacob Waltz, the Peralta family, and Eusebio Fransesco Chino, mentioned in the story, are all real historical characters. The Lost Dutchman's Gold Mine is a real legendary lost mine, and Gonzales Peralta's markings really exist. The only things Rosa invented for himself are the deciphered meaning of Peralta's markings and the connection between Eusebio Fransesco Chino and the lost mine. The Pueblo in which the mine is located in the story appears to have been inspired by a Lieutenant Blueberry story "The Lost Dutchman's Mine and The Ghost with the Golden Bullets" (ISBN 0871357437).

Donald's sharp eyesight when deciphering Peralta's markings is a reference to Rosa's earlier story, An Eye for Detail.

Don Rosa and his wife themselves make a cameo appearance in this story, as mountaineers travelling in the Arizona mountains.
