= Peralta massacre =

Old West event and story

Coordinates: 33.4560°N 111.4760°W

The Peralta massacre was the alleged killing of a Mexican family by Apaches in about 1848. It is generally featured as an element of the legend of the Lost Dutchman's Gold Mine.

There are many variations of the story, but they generally include these details: During the 1840s, the Peralta family of northern Mexico supposedly developed rich gold mine(s) in the Superstition Mountains. In 1848, during a routine expedition to carry gold back to Mexico, the large party was ambushed by Apaches, and all were killed except for a few Peralta family members who escaped. According to the legend, the Apaches buried the gold and covered the mine. However, according to historian Robert Blair, the Peralta massacre never occurred.

The author T.E. Glover in his book, The Lost Dutchman Mine of Jacob Waltz, wrote of a U.S. Cavalry trooper named William Edwards who was present for the discovery of the deceaseds' remains. The Cavalry leaders assumed that these were bodies from an Indian battle between fighting tribes. However, trooper Edwards noticed that at least one of the skulls had a gold filling, common to Mexican (Spanish) aristocracy. He returned at a later date, and found even more human remains further up the canyon. It is reported that he, and then later his son, spent much of their lives searching for the lost mine.

The Peralta massacre is depicted in a flashback in the 1949 film Lust for Gold, starring Glenn Ford and Ida Lupino.

== See also ==
- 1848 in Mexico
