= Peralta Canyon =

Canyon in Pinal County, Arizona

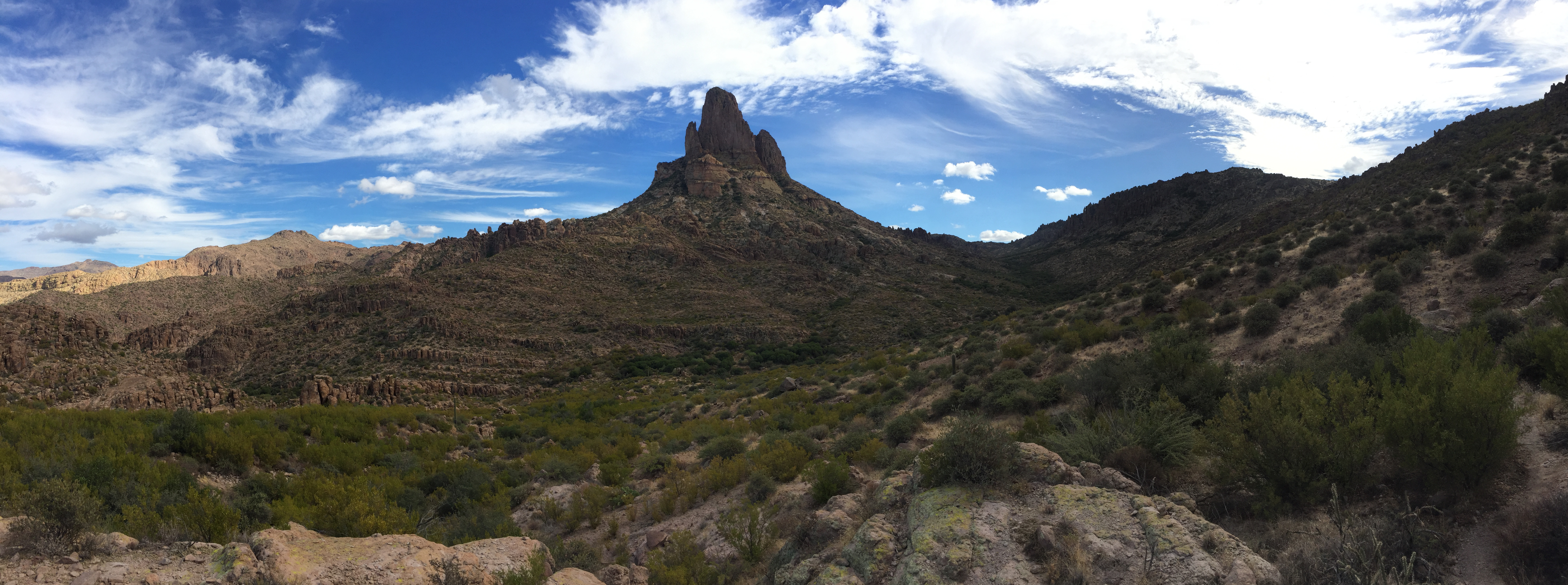
- Floor elevation: 2,277 ft (694 m)

Geography
- Location: Pinal County, Arizona, United States
- Coordinates: 33°23′22.55″N 111°21′0.87″W GNIS
- Interactive map of Peralta Canyon

Peralta Canyon is a canyon on the backside of Superstition Mountain within the Superstition Mountains. The canyon is a popular hiking destination within the Tonto National Forest and contains a single trail up the canyon to Fremont Saddle at the top of the canyon.

Peralta Canyon includes a planned community development of 750 homes constructed over 5 yrs. (2018-2023) in two(2) phases by five(5) Builders: KB Homes, Lennar(Cal Atlantic), Gehan(Brightland), David Weekly and Beazer Homes.
