= James Kidd (prospector) =

American prospector famous for his will

James Kidd (1879–1949) was an American prospector who disappeared in 1949, only to have his will discovered eighteen years later by the Estate Tax Commissioner of Arizona. His request that his estate be gifted to "a research or some scientific proof of a soul of the human body which leaves at death" sparked a number of court cases and set a precedent for the seriousness of psychical organisations.

== Life ==
Kidd was never active in the spiritualist scene within his lifetime and as such little is known about his life; especially as no official documents are available barring his will. Kidd never even held a driving license. It is known that he was born in Ogdensburg, New York and moved to Arizona in 1920 and worked there as a prospector for copper. On November 9, 1949 he went to work in the Superstition Mountains and never returned. It was thought that he had fallen down a canyon. He was officially declared deceased in 1956; however, rumours continued to circulate that he was still alive.

== Estate and will ==
Once Kidd was declared legally deceased the Estate Tax Commissioners office seized his possessions to audit them. In a safety deposit box they found a will dated to 1946 which read as follows:

this is my first and only will and is dated the second of January 1946. I have no heirs and have not married in my life and after all my funeral expenses have been paid and $100 given to some preacher of the gospel to say fare well at my grave sell all my property which is all in cash and stocks with E F Hutton Co Phoenix some in safety deposit box, and have this balance money go into research or some scientific proof of a soul of the human body which leaves at death I think in time there can be a photograph of soul leaving the human at death

— James Kidd, Will and Testament

The will was declared legal by the state of Arizona in the same year. The estate was worth $270,000.

== Court cases ==
Kidd's remaining family attempted to have his will declared invalid. However, when the case went to trial at the Superior Court of Arizona, judge Robert L. Myers received 18 petitions, which eventually grew to 133 from various spiritual organisations declaring that they were best fit to fulfill Kidd's wishes. The trial was called the Soul Trial or the Ghost Trial of the Century by the media and garnered much attention. The estate was originally awarded to the Barrow Neurological Institute in Phoenix but a higher court overturned on appeal and the estate was granted to the American Society for Psychical Research. The court case took a total of 26 years. The money was used to investigate deathbed visions more commonly referred to as near death experiences.
