= Lust for Gold =

1949 film by S. Sylvan Simon

- Theatrical poster
- Directed by: S. Sylvan Simon
- Screenplay by: Ted Sherdeman; Richard English
- Based on: Thunder God's Gold by Barry Storm
- Produced by: S. Sylvan Simon
- Starring: Ida Lupino; Glenn Ford
- Cinematography: Archie Stout
- Edited by: Gene Havlick
- Music by: George Duning
- Color process: Black and white
- Production company: Columbia Pictures
- Distributed by: Columbia Pictures
- Release date: June 10, 1949
- Running time: 90 minutes
- Country: United States
- Language: English

Lust for Gold is a 1949 American Western film directed by S. Sylvan Simon and starring Ida Lupino and Glenn Ford. The film is about the legendary Lost Dutchman gold mine, starring Ford as the "Dutchman" and Lupino as the woman he loves. The historical events are seen through a framing device set in the contemporary 1940s. It was based on the book Thunder God's Gold by Barry Storm. Part of the film was shot on location in Arizona's Superstition Mountains.

== Plot ==
In modern times, a newspaper reports that "noted explorer and writer" Floyd Buckley claims to have discovered the location of the Lost Dutchman gold mine. He is approached by Barry Storm, who believes he has some claim to it, as the Dutchman was his grandfather. Buckley brushes him off, but when he heads into the Superstition Mountains, Storm secretly follows him.

However, an unseen killer shoots Buckley, making him the fourth recent murder victim. Storm notifies Sheriff Early and his deputy Covin. Covin tells Storm more about the mine; a hundred years before, Pedro Peralta had hidden $20 million in gold in the most inaccessible of his mines, only to be killed by the Apaches for defiling a place holy to their "thunder god". His greed whetted, Storm investigates further.

A flashback follows. In 1880, Jacob "Dutchy" Walz and his friend Wiser overhear Ludi carelessly call his companion "Peralta". Recognizing the name, they trail the pair into the mountains. After Ramon Peralta finds his brother's mine, Walz and Wiser gun the two other men down in cold blood; then Walz treacherously shoots Wiser too.

When Walz returns to Phoenix with huge gold nuggets, the news spreads quickly. Scheming, discontented Julia Thomas becomes acquainted with Walz, without telling him she is married to Pete. His suspicions of her motives are allayed by the fact that she can speak German. They soon fall in love. When she finally tells him about her husband, Walz gives her money to bribe Pete into giving her a divorce. However, Walz later learns that Julia has lied to him repeatedly. Unseen, he watches as Julia placates her husband by telling him she will soon learn the location of the mine.

Walz gives Julia directions to the treasure. Though Julia seems to care for Walz, Pete forces her to show him the map. When the couple reach the mine, Walz pins them down with his rifle. In the ensuing gunfight, Pete eventually runs out of bullets. Walz cruelly toys with them, letting them go without water. Finally, Julia stabs Pete in the back and pleads with Walz to believe she loves him. Before he can act, an earthquake triggers a rockfall that crushes her and closes the mine.

The film returns to the present. Storm has uncovered enough information that he believes he knows where the mine is. When he gets to the key landmark, he encounters Covin, who pulls a gun on him. It turns out that the deputy has been searching for the mine for twenty years and has been disposing of his competitors. A fight breaks out; Covin is about to push Storm off the mountain when a poisonous snake bites him; he falls to his death. Afterwards, Sheriff Early points out that, even with the new clue, Storm does not know the exact location and would have to dig up the entire mountainside. At that point, Storm gives up the search, but invites the viewer to try if they wish.

== Cast ==
- Ida Lupino as Julia Thomas
- Glenn Ford as Jacob 'Dutch' Walz
- Gig Young as Pete Thomas
- William Prince as Barry Storm
- Edgar Buchanan as Wiser
- Will Geer as Deputy Ray Covin
- Paul Ford as Sheriff Lynn Early
- Hayden Rorke as Floyd Buckley (uncredited)
- Percy Helton as Barber (uncredited)
- Jay Silverheels as Deputy Walter (uncredited)
- Myrna Dell as Lucille (uncredited)
- Arthur Hunnicutt as Ludi (uncredited)
- Harry Cording as Joe (uncredited)

== Production ==
The film was originally directed by George Marshall and known as Bonanza. Marshall quit four days into filming due to disputes with producer S. Sylvan Simon. Simon took over directing.

== Reception ==
Dennis Schwartz called it "the poor man's Treasure of Sierra Madre" and gave it a grade of B−.
