= Weavers Needle =

Natural rock formation in the Superstition Mountains

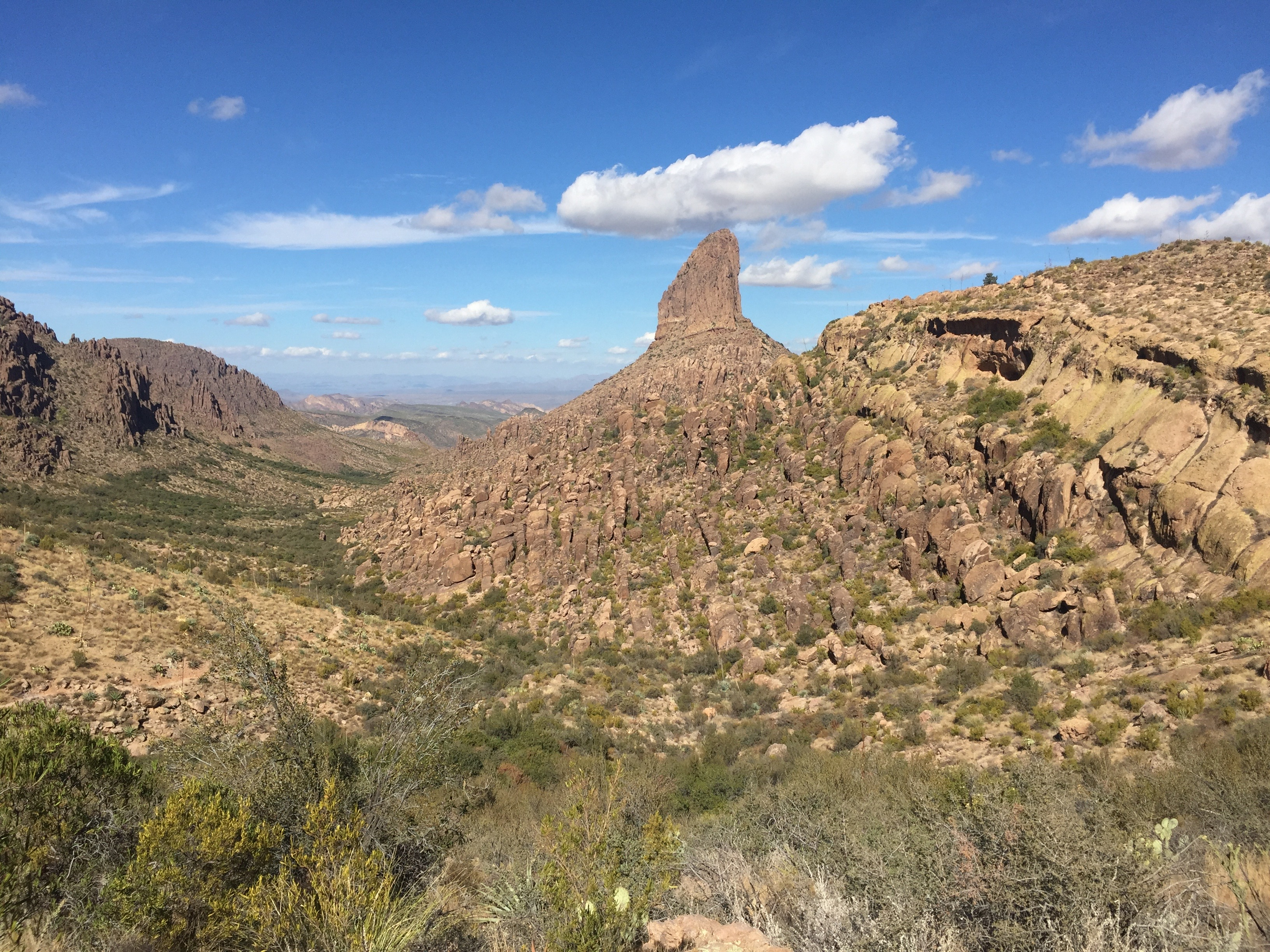

Highest point
- Elevation: 4,555 ft (1,388 m) NAVD 88
- Prominence: 993 ft (303 m)
- Coordinates: 33°25′59″N 111°22′13″W

Geography
- Location within Arizona Location within the United States
- Location: Pinal County, Arizona, U.S.
- Parent range: Superstition Mountains
- Topo map: USGS Weavers Needle

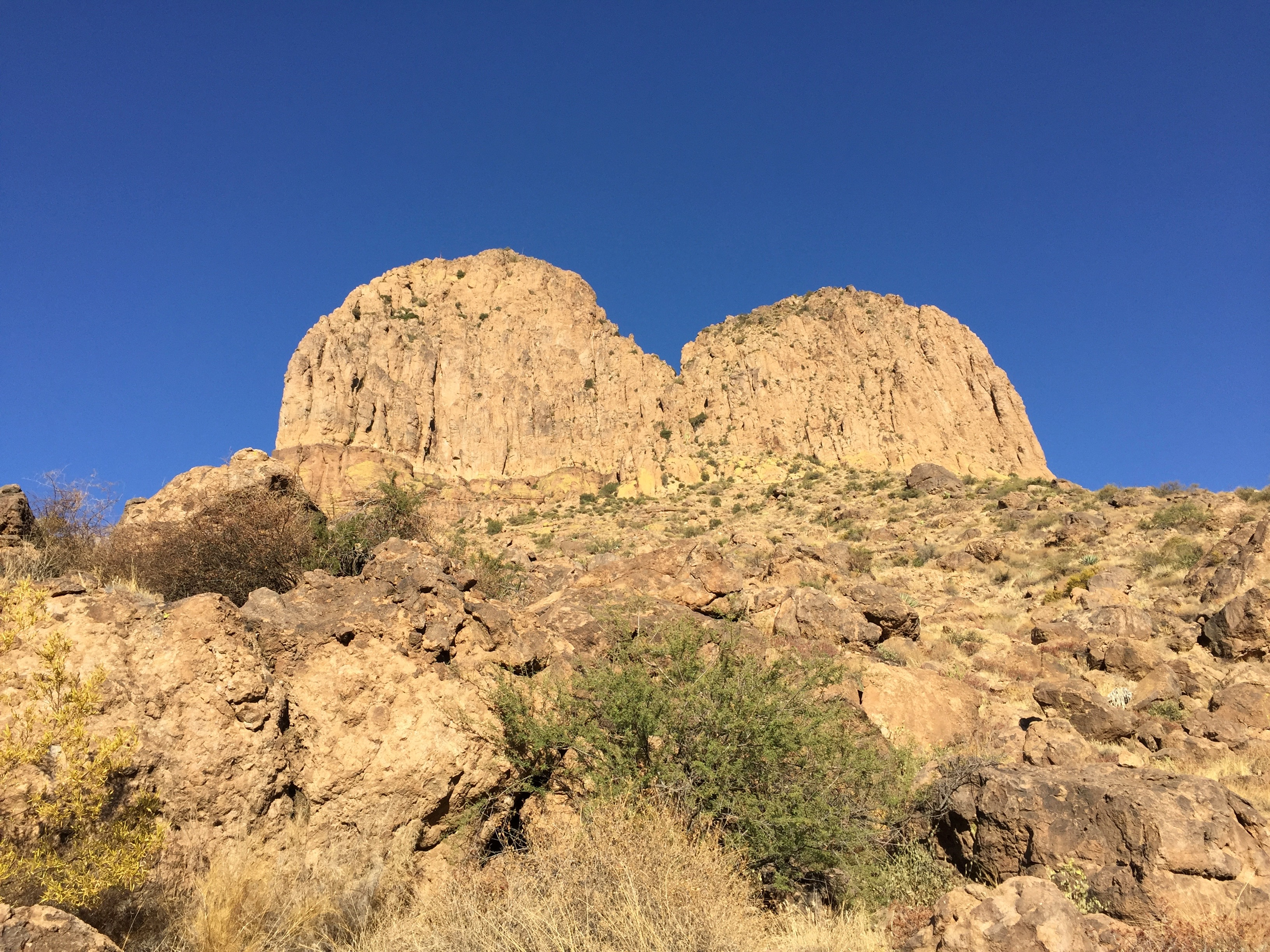
Weavers Needle from Peralta Canyon

Weavers Needle is a 1,000-foot-high (300 m) column of rock that forms a distinctive peak visible for many miles around. Located in the Superstition Mountains east of Phoenix, Arizona, Weavers Needle was created when a thick layer of tuff (fused volcanic ash)—a volcanic plug—was heavily eroded, creating the spire as an erosional remnant with a summit elevation of 4,555 feet (1,388 m). It is set in a desert landscape of cactus and mesquite bush, with large Saguaro cacti particularly prominent. The peak was named after mountain man Pauline Weaver.

Weavers Needle has played a significant role in the stories of the Lost Dutchman's Gold Mine. The Needle's shadow reportedly indicates the location of a rich vein of gold, and many treasure hunters have searched for it. The hunt for gold around Weavers Needle has been pursued by hundreds (possibly thousands) of people. Weavers Needle has a large split in the side that makes it look like it has two tops, not one. This can only be viewed from the side.

Weavers Needle can be climbed as a four-pitch route. Each of the pitches is rated a 5.3 or less, with the second pitch being more of a class 4 scramble. The route is trad (traditional climbing), and opportunities for protection with traditional gear are ample. No permit is required to hike to Weavers Needle, to climb, or to camp at the top. Highly experienced climbers will often free-solo, and rappel from the fixed anchors at the top. Despite the relatively low rating of the climb, this is not recommended for beginner or intermediate climbers.

The area surrounding Weavers Needle was burned in the Sawtooth Fire in June 2020.

== See also ==
- Tonto National Forest
