= Circlestone =

Stone ruins in the Superstition Wilderness

Coordinates: 33.4775°N 111.1343°W

Circlestone are stone ruins in Arizona's Superstition Wilderness about 45 miles from Phoenix. The ruins are not a circular space of standing stones; however, like many standing stone monuments found elsewhere in the world it does have elements of construction that to some suggest it was built to track celestial events. The Circlestone structure is one of similar, roughly circular stonewall sites that survive in the region.
