= Lost Dutchman Mine (video game) =

1989 video game

- PC cover art
- Developer(s): Magnetic Images
- Publisher(s): Magnetic Images
- Platform(s): Amiga, Atari ST, MS-DOS
- Release: 1989
- Genre(s): Adventure
- Mode(s): Single-player

Lost Dutchman Mine is a non-linear adventure video game which puts the player in the role of a gold miner, in 1896 A.D. The game was the biggest success for its publisher, Magnetic Images.

The player was free to roam around the desert and town at will, constrained only by the need to make sure he had enough food to eat and a safe place to sleep. Earning money could be accomplished in a variety of ways, including panning for gold in a river, mining for gold in a cave or capturing a wanted bandit. Food could be purchased or caught from a river if the player had previously acquired fishing gear.

The game became well known for its breezy, free-flowing nature. The game was also notable for not having a single environment for the player to operate in; the location of mines and rivers, and the details of characters the player could meet were different each time the game was played.

== Reception ==
Abandonware website Abandonia's Ted Striker reviewed Lost Dutchman Mine with: "There are different modes that the game will put you in, which are equally basic and so fun (something basic is something fun). The game runs on real-time and you need to do what you would need to do in a real expedition: get well equipped, be sure to check your supplies often and don't panic once you encounter danger. After all, isn't it, this very feature, that makes a game addictive in the first place?"

== See also ==
- Lost Dutchman's Gold Mine (American historical site)
- Al Emmo and the Lost Dutchman's Mine (2006 game)
