= Peralta Stones =

Engraved stones in the Superstition Mountains of Arizona

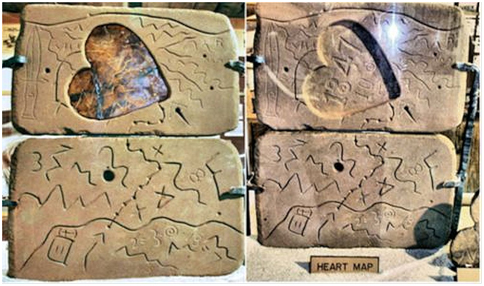
Front View of the Peralta Stones

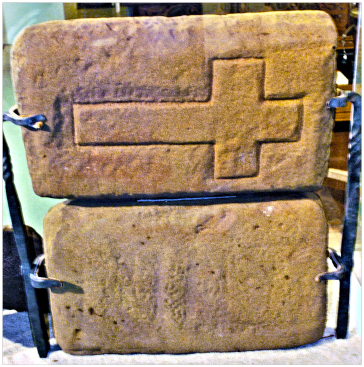
Front Back of the Peralta Stones

The Peralta Stones are a set of engraved stones supposedly indicating the location of the Lost Dutchman's Gold Mine, in Arizona, United States. The "Dutchman" was actually a German immigrant named Jacob Waltz (c. 1810–1891).

The story goes that the stones are named for an obscure "Peralta family", supposedly an old and powerful Mexican family. Some people named Peralta owned a cattle ranch that included what is now Oakland, California at the time of the Mexican–American War. Another Peralta, Pedro de Peralta, was the governor of the Spanish territory in New Mexico, and picked the site for Santa Fe. Nevertheless, the Peralta surname is common in Spain and Mexico, and it became associated with the "Peralta" mine by James Reavis. Reavis popularized the idea of a rich Peralta family in Arizona in 1882 when he tried to assert a phony Peralta Spanish land grant which included a huge swath of Arizona and New Mexico, including the Superstition Mountains. His forged Peralta genealogy was exposed, and he served a prison sentence for fraud. According to current legend, but not supported by the historical record, some Peraltas mined in the Superstition Mountains. The first written reference to a “Peralta mine” in the Superstitions was in 1895, by writer Pierpont C. Bicknell.

== Description ==
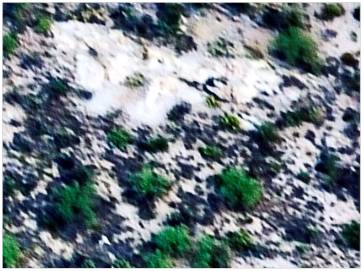
"Hidden Heart" of the Peralta Stones

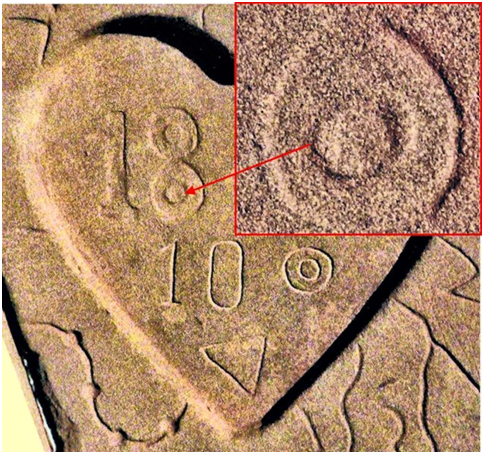
"Hidden Heart" of the Peralta Stones

The stones consist of "two red sandstone tablets and a heart-shaped rock made of red quartzite. Each block is approximately 8.25” (~ 21 cm) by 14” (~35.6 cm) and 2” thick, weighing about 25 lbs. Each red stone block is carved with lines and one long line. When the two blocks are placed side by side and the stone heart is inserted the long line has 18 dots pecked into it. This style of map is known as a Post Road Map and it is a style used in Mexico and Spain during the Mexican–American War. Inscribed on the stones is the date 1847, and one stone contains a Sunken relief or intaglio of a heart, into which the heart-shaped stone fits perfectly. The back of the stone that the heart-shaped stone fits into has the outline of a cross carved into it.

There is confusion about the discovery of the Peralta Stones. Some sources say they were found by a man named "Jack" in 1956 (one source says 1952, another 1949) near the main highway that goes southeast from Apache Junction, Arizona,. in the vicinity of Black Point (33°16'19.86"N by 111°19'38.36"W). Another item found at this site is known as the Latin Heart.

The two red sandstone map pieces are displayed with a third white sandstone of similar size and weight as the red ones. The history of the white stone was cited by an author using the moniker ‘Azmula’. Azmula cites the history in the Superstition Mountain Journal, issue 27 of 2009. He attributes the original citation to M. Kraig Roberts. Mr. Roberts's article is titled “History of the Chain Of Possession Of The Stone Maps”. The Journal article is a history of the white stone. The white sandstone has a side showing a Priest who is assembling the Peralta Stones to form the map. The reverse side is known as the Horse Map. The Priests Stone contains Spanish text that states that to find the gold you must find the heart.

The story of the Peralta Stones' discovery and the stones themselves are not very convincing to most researchers. The engravings appear to have been created using modern power tools, with modern symbols, and modern Spanish.

Father Charles Polzer, an ethnohistorian associated with the Arizona State Museum, is convinced the stones are fakes. Among other reasons, he says that the modern valentine-shaped symbol used to denote a heart was a symbol unknown to 19th-century Spaniards.

== Treasure map ==
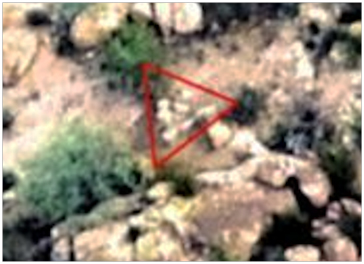
Aerial Photo of ‘Noto Triangulum’ of the Latin Heart

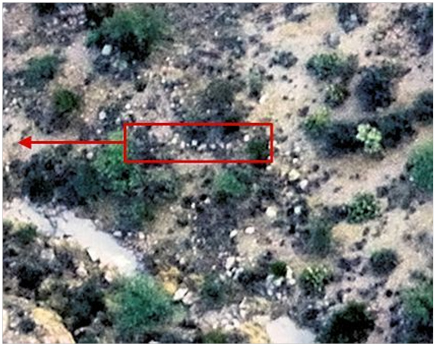
Latin Heart Axis

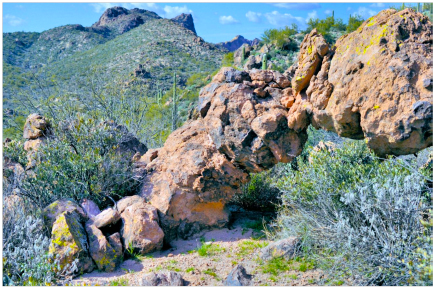
Latin Heart: Fornix (Arch)

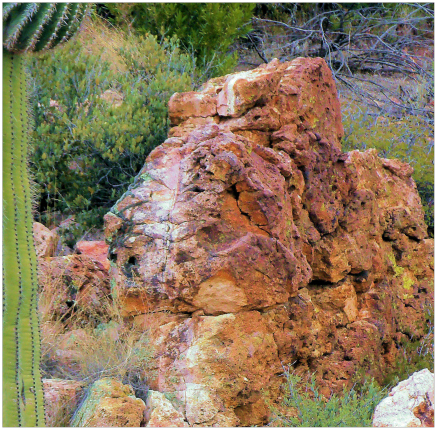
Latin Heart Peralta gold mine: mesothermal quartz vein with gold ore

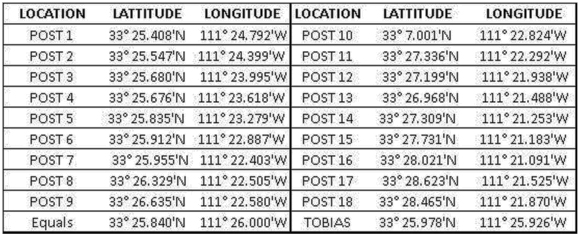
Table of GPS Coordinates of the 18 Peralta Stone Map Posts.

According to local lore, the stones contain a map indicating the location of the Lost Dutchman's Gold Mine. Various claims have been made about the location of the gold mine based on an interpretation of the stones, and such claims appear at regular intervals—though no one has yet recovered a flake of Jacob Waltz's gold.

Claims about interpretations of the map are many, as are accounts of the stones' origins, and most of those claims are made in self-publishing printers.

According to Lon Safko, the stones were made by the Peralta family and handed down for generations.

Danny Adams, in 2005, read the map as a coded message and claims the stones were made by Ted DeGrazia, a painter and art collector rumored to have burned (or buried) a collection of art worth $5 million rather than pay taxes on his property; Adams claims one of the stones reads "Be ready boy, are on a map on Arizona county scale, scale map" and aided by numerological analysis locates the mine in Upper Labarge Canyon. The treasure of paintings, supposedly hidden in the mine, is also connected, somehow, to a conspiracy of 50 businessmen from the Phoenix area to hide DeGrazia's work.

In 2007, William and Michael Johnson (originally from Massachusetts) said that they had identified a privately owned cave as the mine, based on the clues left in the Peralta Stones.

== Location ==
The Peralta Stones were held at the Arizona Museum of Natural History, 53 N. Macdonald, in Mesa, Arizona, previously known as the Mesa Southwest Museum. In June 2009, they were to go on extended display at the Superstition Mountain Museum, 4087 N. Apache Trail, in Apache Junction, Arizona. As of September, 2012, the stones are once again displayed at the Arizona Museum of Natural History.

== See also ==
Lost Dutchman State Park
