= Peralta Villa, Oakland, California =

Coordinates: 37°48′27″N 122°17′29″W

Peralta Villa is a neighborhood in Oakland in Alameda County, California. It lies at an elevation of 20 feet (6 m). It was formerly an unincorporated community.
