= Lost Dutchman State Park =

State park in Arizona, United States

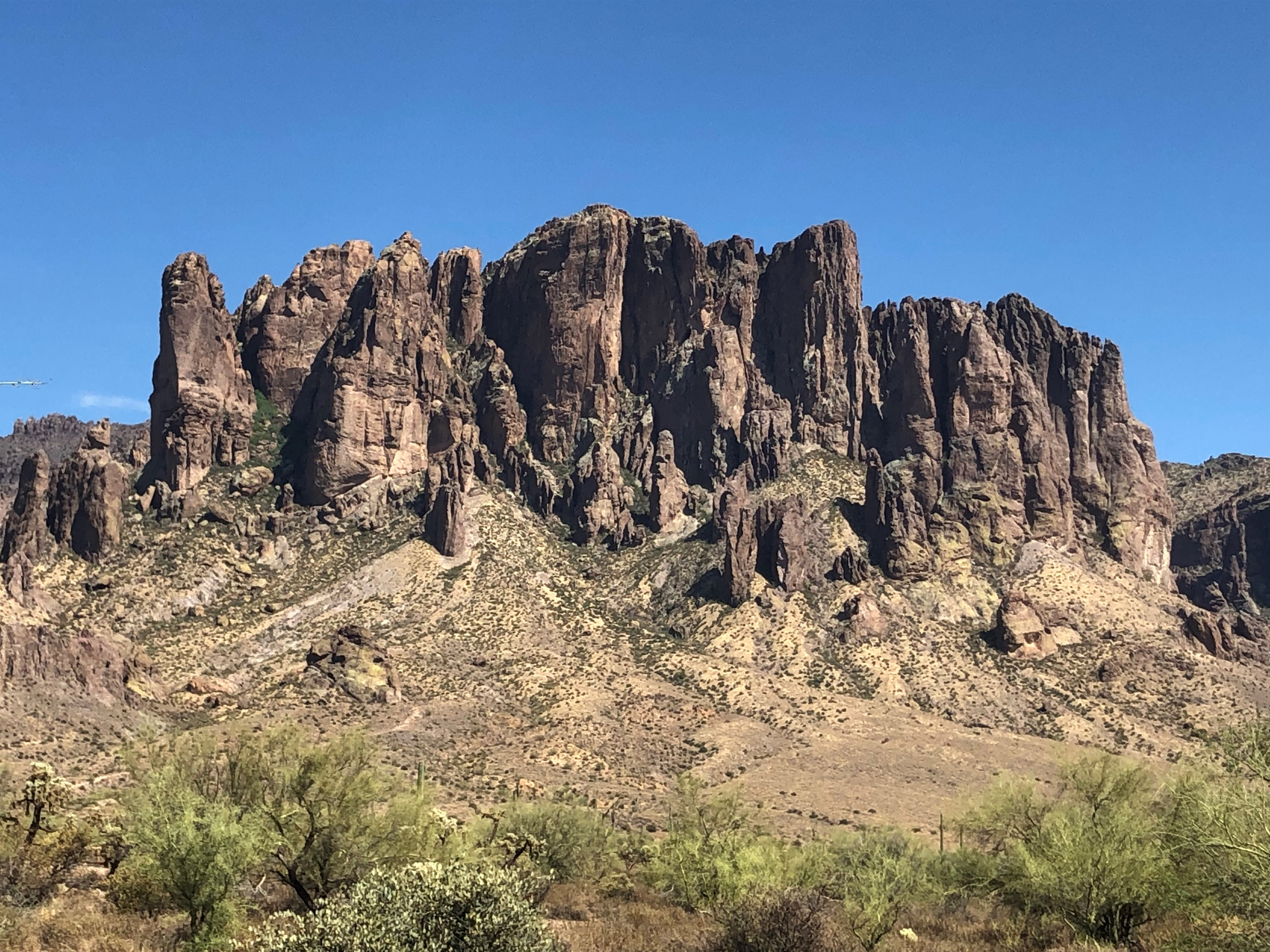
- A view of the Superstition Mountains from Lost Dutchman State Park

- Location within Arizona
- Location: Pinal County, Arizona, United States
- Coordinates: 33°27′51″N 111°28′55″W
- Area: 320 acres (130 ha)
- Elevation: 2,000 ft (610 m)
- Established: 1977
- Administrator: Arizona State Parks & Trails
- Visitors: 132,621 (in 2024)
- Website: Official website

Lost Dutchman State Park is a 320-acre (129 ha) state park located in northwestern Pinal County, Arizona on the Apache Trail (State Route 88) north of Apache Junction, near the Superstition Mountains in central Arizona. It is named after the Lost Dutchman's Gold Mine, a famously lost gold mine legendary in the tales of the Old West. It is accessible about 40 miles (64 km) east of Phoenix via U.S. Highway 60, the Superstition Freeway.

The park provides hiking trails and mountain bike access to the area known as the Superstition Wilderness, as well as views of the mountains.

== History ==
The area was first developed as a day use recreation area by the federal Bureau of Land Management in 1972. BLM built paved roads into the area as well as a parking lot with picnic facilities, restrooms, and ramadas. A sewage treatment plant was installed to support this, and an electrical system. In 1973, BLM had discussion with Arizona State Parks about the possible transfer of this area from federal to state jurisdiction.

In 1975, legislation was introduced for the purchase of the area for $2.50 per acre (0.4 ha) through the Federal Recreation and Public Purposes Act (R&PP), but this legislation did not pass. After the U.S. Congress changed the act to allow states to acquire federal land for recreational purposes at no cost, the 292 acres (118 ha) abutting the Tonto National Forest was transferred on September 13, 1977, via legislative action to the state of Arizona, creating the Lost Dutchman State Park. An additional 28 acres (11 ha) was leased through R&PP in 1983, expanding the park to 320 acres (130 ha).

Lost Dutchman was among 13 Arizona state parks that faced closure in 2010 due to budgeting problems; ultimately all of them stayed open. (Note: When a man from Katy, Texas, Taylor H. Sanford Jr., 76, learned of the park's scheduled closure on June 3, 2010, he donated $8,000 so the park could stay open. It was not reported whether the money was returned to him when the park failed to close.)

== Features ==
The park offers camping facilities, day use parking and acts as a trailhead for the trails leading into the Tonto National Forest in which the Superstition Mountains are located. Some of the most popular walks are from the park onto the National Forest Service trails that lead across the western face of the Superstitions (Jacob's Crosscut trail) and up the face of this edge using Siphon Draw trail. Many people confuse these National Forest trails with trails that are maintained by Lost Dutchman State Park.

== Trails and recreation ==
=== Siphon Draw to Flatiron ===
Siphon Draw is a popular trail, and leads to the iconic "Flatiron" which looks like a ship's bow jutting out of the side of the mountain range. The last mile of hiking up to the Flatiron is a steep boulder scramble. The land is classed as in maintained wilderness area and does not offer trail signs or markers. The last 10 yards (9.1 m) of the trail to the Flatiron are a class four scramble called 'The Wall'. Park Rangers recommend gloves. The last mile is not suitable for hiking with dogs.

=== Superstition Ridgeline Flatiron to Peralta Trailhead ===
The trail continues along the ridge to Peralta Trailhead about 8 miles (13 km) away. The section of the trail from Lost Dutchman State Park to the Basin, halfway up, is well marked and popular, and required route finding skills are minimal. The last mile up to the Flatiron at the top of the ridge is unmarked wilderness area. From the Flatiron along the top of the ridge to Peralta Trailhead, the trail is much less obvious as it gets much less traffic, marked only by cairns. This area is extremely remote and can be accessed only the trailheads at each end. Hog Canyon or Hieroglyphics Canyon provide possible escape routes in case of emergency, but these trails are more rugged and require more advanced route finding skill than the ridgeline itself. Because of the remote and difficult nature of these canyons, hikers should prepare to finish the entire hike and bring emergency gear with them.

This hike should not be attempted in summer. There is no water along the route, and little shade, and the amount of water that must be consumed may exceed the carrying capacity of even the strongest hikers. Even in winter or shoulder season, each hiker should carry between one and two gallons of pure water.

The ridgeline has a net elevation gain of about 2,800 feet (850 m) from the lowest point at Siphon Draw Trail head at 2,000 feet (610 m) to the highest point as it skirts Superstition Peak at about 4,800 feet (1,500 m). However, the accumulated elevation gain is about 4,400 feet (1,300 m) more than Bright Angel Trail in the Grand Canyon. Furthermore, Bright Angel Trail has water available from potable water stations, and from proximity to Bright Angel Creek and the Colorado River, while the Superstition Ridgeline does not have water.

==== Incidents ====
Hikers are urged to use caution while visiting the park and where fatal accidents and injuries have been known to happen, especially for those brought to the park to search for the Lost Dutchman gold mine.

- In 2013, skeletal remains were found under a cliff at the park. They were later identified to belong to Jesse Capen, a adventurer who was last heard from in 2009 and presumed to have died accidentally while searching for the Lost Dutchman gold mine.
- In 2016 the body of a hiker was found after his mother reported that he had not returned from a hike in the park.
- In 2022, 21-year old Richard Jacobson fell 700 feet while taking a selfie on top of Flatiron Summit. He was fatally injured.
- In 2024, experienced hiker Kristopher Childers was fatally injured in a fall while hiking the Flatiron route.
