= Lost Dutchman's Gold Mine =

Alleged mine in Southwestern United States

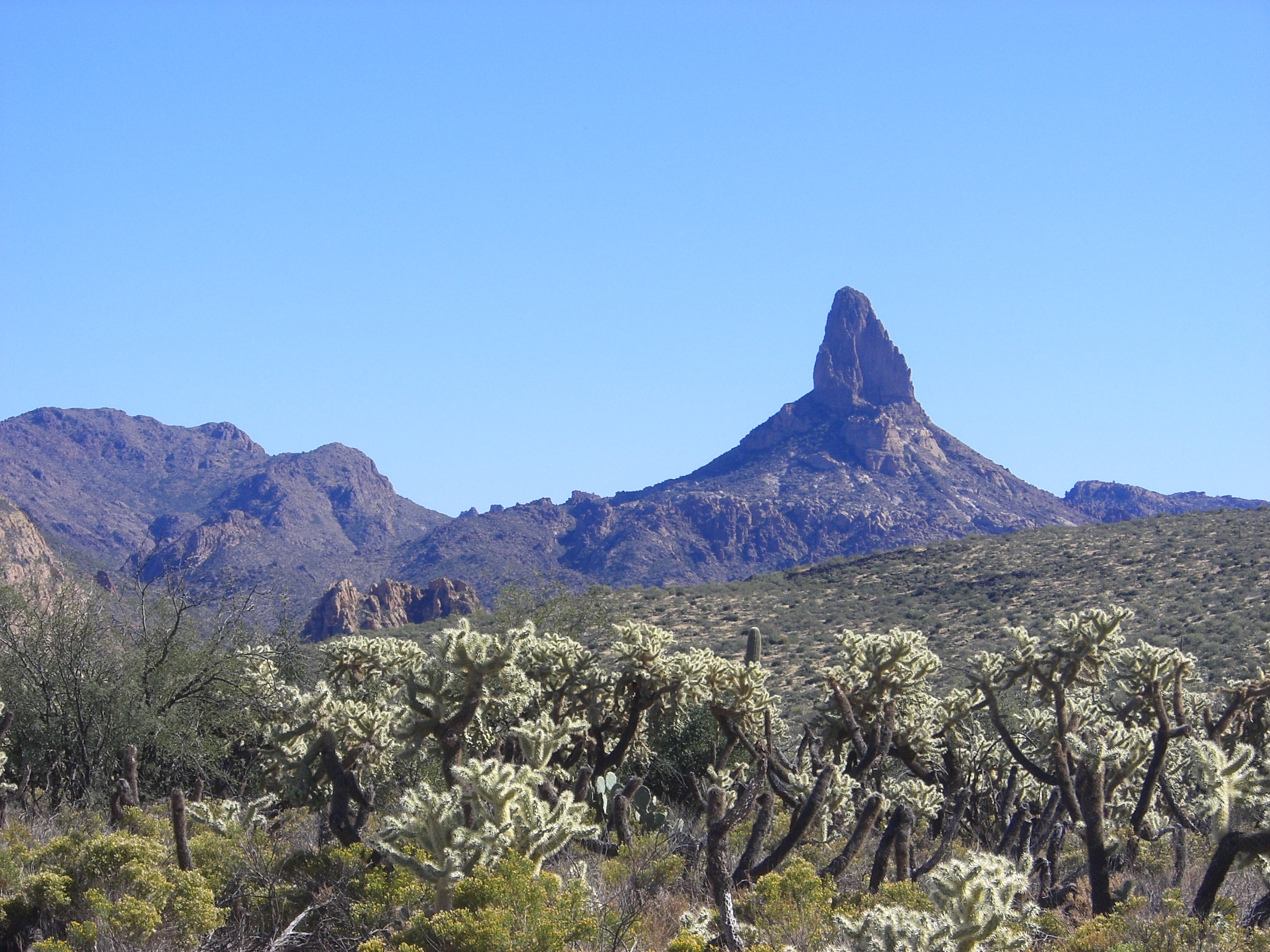
In many versions of the story, Weavers Needle is a prominent landmark for locating the lost mine.

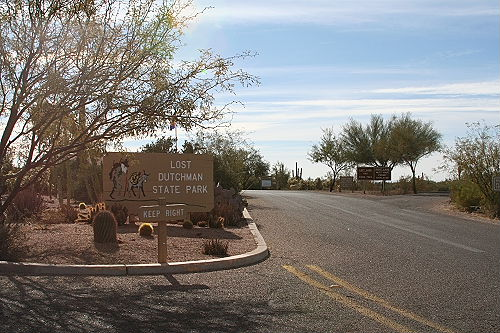
Entrance to Lost Dutchman State Park

The Lost Dutchman's Gold Mine (also known by similar names) is, according to legend, a rich gold mine hidden in the Southwestern United States. The location is generally believed to be in the Superstition Mountains, near Apache Junction, east of Phoenix, Arizona. There have been many stories about how to find the mine, and each year people search for the mine. Some have died on the search.

The mine is named after German immigrant Jacob Waltz (c. 1810–1891), who purportedly discovered it in the 19th century and kept its location a secret. "Dutchman" was a common American term for a German ("Dutch" being the English cognate to the German demonym "Deutsch", and not a reference to the Dutch people).

The Lost Dutchman's is perhaps the most famous lost mine in American history. Arizona place-name expert Byrd Granger wrote, as of 1977, that the Lost Dutchman's story had been printed or cited at least six times more often than two other fairly well-known tales; the story of Captain Kidd's lost treasure, and the story of the Lost Pegleg mine in California. People have been seeking the Lost Dutchman's mine since at least 1892, while according to one estimate, 9,000 people annually made some effort to locate the Lost Dutchman's mine. Former Arizona Attorney General Robert K. Corbin is among those who have looked for the mine.

== Other Lost Dutchman's mines ==
Robert Blair wrote "[t]here have been at least four legendary Lost Dutchman's gold mines in the American West, including the famed Superstition mine of Jacob Waltz". One Lost Dutchman's mine is said to be in Colorado, another in California; two are said to be located in Arizona. Tales of these other Lost Dutchman's mines can be traced to at least the 1870s. The earliest Lost Dutchman's mine in Arizona was said to have been near Wickenburg, about 180 km (110 mi) north-west of the Superstition Mountains: a "Dutchman" was allegedly discovered dead in the desert near Wickenburg in the 1870s alongside saddlebags filled with gold. Blair suggested that "fragments of this legend have perhaps become attached to the mythical mine of Jacob Waltz".

== Stories about the mine ==
Granger wrote that "fact and fiction blend in the tales", but that there are three main elements to the story:

"They are, first, tales of the lost Apache gold or Dr. Thorne's mine; second, tales about the Lost Dutchman's; and, third, stories of the soldiers' lost gold vein ... [t]he most complete version of the Lost Dutchman's story incorporates all three legends". Blair argued that there are kernels of truth at the heart of each of these three main stories, though the popular story is often badly garbled from the actual account. Other theories have materialized that speculate the mine is buried at the bottom of Apache or Roosevelt Lake.

In 1977, Granger identified 62 variants of the Lost Dutchman's story – some of the variations are minor, but others are substantial, casting the story in a very different light from the other versions.

=== Lost Apache gold or Dr. Thorne's story ===
In this story (actually two interconnected stories), members of the Apache tribe are said to have a very rich gold mine located in the Superstition Mountains. Famed Apache Geronimo is sometimes mentioned in relation to this story. In most variants of the story, the family of a man called Miguel Peralta discovered the mine and began mining the gold there, only to be attacked or massacred by Apaches in about 1850 in the supposed Peralta massacre. Years later, a man called Dr. Thorne treats an ailing or wounded Apache (often alleged to be a chieftain) and is rewarded with a trip to a rich gold mine. He is blindfolded and taken there by a circuitous route, and is allowed to take as much gold ore as he can carry before again being escorted blindfolded from the site by the Apaches. Thorne is said to be either unwilling or unable to relocate the mine.

==== The truth about the Peralta Mine ====
Most likely because Pedro de Peralta had been the Spanish Governor of New Mexico (in the 1600s) his family name of "Peralta" was the inspiration for a number of legends in the American Southwest. James Reavis tried to assert that the Peralta family had a Spanish land grant and a barony granted by the King of Spain, which included a huge swath of Arizona and New Mexico, including the Superstition Mountains. The Peralta Massacre is a legend that Apaches supposedly ambushed a mining expedition the Peralta family sent into the mountains. Some carved stones in the area are referred to as "Peralta Stones" and Spanish text and crude maps on them are considered by some to be clues to the location of a Peralta family gold mine in the Superstition Mountains, although others believe the stones to be modern fakes. A lack of historical records leaves uncertainty as to whether a Peralta family ever had possession of land, or mines, in or near the Superstition Mountains.

Blair insisted that the Peralta portion of the story is unreliable, writing: "The operation of a gold mine in the Superstitions by a Peralta family is a contrivance of 20th century writers". A man named Miguel Peralta and his family did operate a successful mine in the 1860s – but near Valencia, California, not in Arizona. The mine was quite profitable, earning about $35,000 in less than one year; Blair described this as "an unusually good return" for such a small gold mine to earn in such a relatively brief period. As of 1975, ruins of the Peralta mine were standing.

However, the Peralta Mine eventually became unprofitable and after the money was gone Miguel Peralta turned to fraud. Dr. George M. Willing Jr. paid Peralta $20,000 for the mining rights for an enormous swath of land – about 3,000,000 acres (12,000 km^{2}) in southern Arizona and New Mexico – based on a deed originally granted by the Spanish Empire in the 18th century. Trouble came after Willing learned that the deed was entirely bogus. Despite his efforts, Willing was never able to recover the money he gave to Peralta. This land grant was the basis of the James Reavis Arizona land swindle (Reavis became Willing's partner and continued to try to prove the authenticity of the land grant for years after Willing's death).

Blair argued that this Peralta story (well known to Arizona residents) was eventually incorporated in the Lost Dutchman's story, in a severely distorted version, following the renewed interest in the Lost Dutchman's mine in the 1930s.

Since James Reavis, "the Baron of Arizona", was convicted of fraud when the Peralta family genealogy and other documents to support the land grant (and a barony associated with that land) were determined to be forgeries it also raises questions about the original purchase of the land grant by Dr. George M. Willing Jr. (the transaction had supposedly occurred at a primitive campsite to the southeast of Prescott without the benefit of the typical documentation; instead of a notarized deed, the conveyance was recorded on a piece of greasy camp paper bearing signature of several witnesses). Willing died in 1874 before there had been a thorough investigation of the documents or opportunity to cross examine him on the stand as was later done with Reavis.

==== The truth about Dr. Thorne ====
Another detail which casts doubt on the story is the fact that, according to Blair, there was never any Dr. Thorne in the employ of the Army or indeed of the Federal Government in the 1860s. According to Blair, the origin of this story can be traced to a doctor named Thorne who was in private practice in New Mexico in the 1860s. Thorne claimed that he was taken captive by Navajos in 1854, and that during his captivity he had discovered a rich gold vein. Thorne related his claims to three U.S. soldiers in about 1858. The three soldiers set out to find the gold, but without success. Over the decades, this tale was gradually absorbed into the Lost Dutchman's story.

=== The Lost Dutchman's story ===
This tale involves two German men, Jacob Waltz and Jacob Weiser. However, Blair argued that there is a strong likelihood that there never was a second man named Weiser; rather, a single person named Waltz was, over the years, turned into two men as the legend of the Dutchman's mine evolved. Blair contended that this story can be divided into "hawk" and "dove" versions, depending on whether the German(s) are said to behave violently or peacefully. In most versions of the tale, Jacob Waltz locates a rich gold mine in the Superstition Mountains (in many versions of the story, they rescue or help a member of the Peralta family and are rewarded by being told the location of the mine). Waltz is attacked and wounded by marauding Apaches, but survives at least long enough to tell a man called Dr. Walker about the mine. Waltz is also said to make a deathbed confession to Julia Thomas, and draws or describes a crude map to the gold mine.

John D. Wilburn in his book Dutchman's Lost Ledge of Gold (1990), wrote that the Bulldog Gold Mine near Goldfield, Arizona, fits very well the description Jacob Waltz gave as the location of his 'lost mine'. Furthermore, Wilburn stated that geology indicates that there is no gold in the Superstition Mountains, which are igneous in origin. (However, in some versions, the 'mine' is actually a cache put there by the Peraltas.)

=== Stories of the soldiers' lost gold vein ===
In yet another version of the tale, two (or more) U.S. Army soldiers are said to have discovered a vein of almost pure gold in or near the Superstition Mountains. The soldiers are alleged to have presented some of the gold, but to have been killed or to have vanished soon after.

This account is usually dated to about 1870. According to Blair, the story may have its roots in the efforts of three U.S. soldiers to locate gold in an area of New Mexico, based on an allegedly true story related to them by Dr. Thorne of New Mexico; see above.

== The historical Jacob Waltz ==
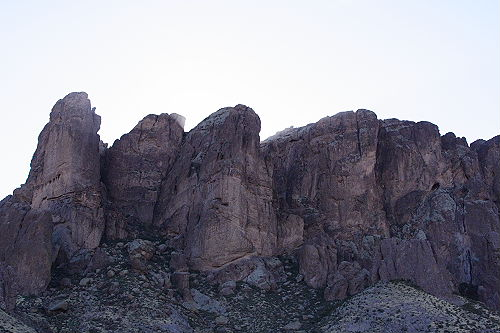
A view of Superstition Mountains in Lost Dutchman State Park

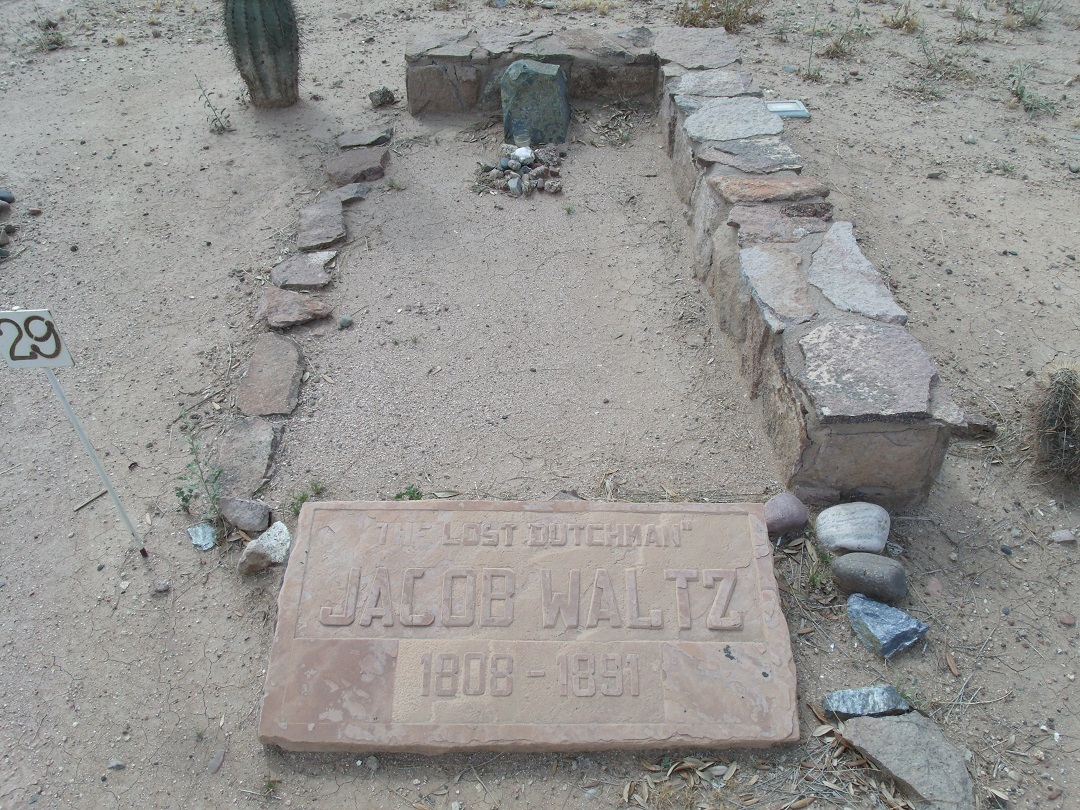
Grave of Jacob Waltz, Pioneer and Military Cemetery, west of downtown Phoenix

Blair cited evidence of the historical Jacob Waltz and suggested that additional evidence supports the core elements of the story – that Waltz claimed to have discovered (or at least heard the story of) a rich gold vein or cache. But Blair suggested that this core story was distorted in subsequent retellings, comparing the many variants of the Lost Dutchman's story to the game of Chinese whispers, where the original account is distorted in multiple retellings of the tale.

There was indeed a Jacob Waltz who emigrated to the U.S. from Germany. The earliest documentation of him in the U.S. is an 1848 affidavit in which Waltz declared himself to be "about 38 years old". A man called Jacob Walz was born in September 1810 in Württemberg. Blair suggested that this Waltz could be the same Waltz who later came to be regarded as the legendary Dutchman, and that he Americanized the spelling of his family name. Note that tombstone pictured shows birth year as 1808.

Waltz relocated to Arizona in the 1860s, and stayed in the territory for most of the rest of his life. He pursued mining and prospecting, but seems to have had little luck with either. An alternate view which better fits the lost mine legend is that he periodically appeared with large amounts of gold, The Sterling Legend by Estee Conatser reports that a Jacob Walzer sold $250,000 in gold to the U.S. Mint during the 1880s and had $1500 when he died in 1891. In 1870, Waltz had a homestead of about 160 acres (0.65 km^{2}) near Phoenix where he operated a farm. There is a theory that although Waltz never worked at Henry Wickenburg's Vulture mine, (which was notorious for being poorly managed) he could indeed have been a "fence" for those who did work at the Vulture.

There was a catastrophic flood in Phoenix in 1891, and Waltz's farm was one of many that was devastated. Afterwards, Waltz fell ill (he was rumored to have contracted pneumonia during the flooding). He died on October 25, 1891, after having been nursed by an acquaintance named Julia Thomas (she was usually described as a quadroon). Waltz was buried in Phoenix at what is now called the Pioneer and Military Memorial Park.

Blair had little doubt that Waltz related to Thomas the location of an alleged gold mine. As early as September 1, 1892, The Arizona Enterprise was reporting on the efforts of Thomas and several others to locate the lost mine whose location was told to her by Waltz. After this was unsuccessful, Thomas and her partners were reported to be selling maps to the mine for $7 each.

== The death of Adolph Ruth ==
Were it not for the death of amateur explorer and treasure hunter Adolph Ruth, the story of the Lost Dutchman's mine would probably have been little more than a footnote in Arizona history as one of hundreds of "lost mines" rumored to be in the American West. Ruth disappeared while searching for the mine in the summer of 1931. His skull – with two holes in it identified as bullet holes – was recovered about six months after he vanished, and the story made national news, thus sparking widespread interest in the Lost Dutchman's mine.

In a story that echoes some of the earlier tales, Ruth's son Erwin C. Ruth was said to have learned of the Peralta mine from a man called Pedro Gonzales (or Gonzalez). According to the story, in about 1912 Erwin C. Ruth gave some legal aid to Gonzales, saving him from almost certain imprisonment. In gratitude, Gonzales told Erwin about the Peralta mine in the Superstition Mountains, and gave him some antique maps of the site (Gonzales claimed to be descended from the Peralta family on his mother's side). Erwin passed the information to his father Adolph, who had a long-standing interest in lost mines and amateur exploration. The elder Ruth had fallen and badly broken several bones while seeking the lost Pegleg mine in California. He had metal pins in his leg, and used a cane to help him walk.

In June 1931, Ruth set out to locate the lost Peralta mine. After traveling to the region, Ruth stayed several days at the ranch of Tex Barkely to outfit his expedition. Barkely repeatedly urged Ruth to abandon his search for the mine, because the terrain of the Superstition Mountains was treacherous even for experienced outdoorsmen, let alone for the 66-year-old Ruth in the heat of the Arizona summer.

However, Ruth ignored Barkely's advice, and set out for a two-week stint in the mountains. Ruth did not return as scheduled, and no trace of him could be found after a brief search. In December, 1931, The Arizona Republic reported on the recent discovery of a human skull in the Superstition Mountains. To determine if the skull was Ruth's, it was examined by Dr. Aleš Hrdlička, a well-respected anthropologist who was given several photos of Ruth, along with Ruth's dental records. As Curt Gentry wrote, "Dr. Hrdlicka positively identified the skull as that of Adolph Ruth. He further stated, after examining the two holes [in the skull], that it appeared that a shotgun or high-powered rifle had been fired through the head at almost point-blank range, making the small hole when the bullet entered and the large hole when it exited".

In January 1932, human remains were discovered about three-quarters of a mile (1.21 km) from where the skull had been found. Though the remains had been scattered by scavengers, they were undoubtedly Ruth's. Many of Ruth's personal effects were found at the scene, including a pistol (not missing any shells) and the metal pins used to mend his broken bones. But the map to the Peralta mine was said to be missing.

Tantalizingly, Ruth's checkbook was also recovered, and proved to contain a note written by Ruth wherein he claimed to have discovered the mine and gave detailed directions. Ruth ended his note with the phrase "Veni, vidi, vici."

Authorities in Arizona did not convene a criminal inquest regarding Ruth's death. They argued that Ruth had probably succumbed to thirst or heart disease (though, as Gentry wrote, "[o]ne official went so far as to suggest that [Adolph Ruth] might have committed suicide ... While this theory did not ignore the two holes in the skull, it did fail to explain how Ruth had managed to remove and bury the empty shell, then reload his gun, after shooting himself through the head".) Blair noted that the conclusion of the Arizona authorities was rejected by many, including Ruth's family, and "those who held onto the more romantic murdered-for-the-map story".

Blair wrote that "the national wire services picked up the story [of Ruth's death] and ran it for more than it was worth", possibly seeing the mysterious story as a welcome reprieve from the bleak news that was otherwise typical of the Great Depression.

== Other searches for the mine ==
Throughout the 20th century, various expeditions and individuals continued to search the Superstitions for the Lost Dutchman Mine. One of the most professional and serious-minded efforts was led by Oklahoma City private detective Glen Magill, who organized multiple expeditions in the late 1960s and early '70s, and claimed on at least two occasions to have identified the location of the mine, later to concede he was either mistaken or the locations were "played out," or bereft of gold. Magill's adventures were chronicled in the book The Killer Mountains, by Curt Gentry.

One fact against the existence of "Lost Dutchman Mine" is that Waltz was a "placer miner"; while the gold pieces he had were in quartz, the Superstition Mountains are in fact volcanic. Lastly, the alleged mine directions Ruth had were from an 1895 newspaper account.

== Other deaths and disappearances ==
Since Ruth's death, there have been several other deaths or disappearances in the Superstition Mountains. Some searchers for the mine have disappeared in likely wilderness accidents.

- January 1933, a Mining electrician named J.A. "Tex" Bradford of Globe Arizona went in search of the "Lost Dutchman Mine"; by October 1933, he had been missing for nine months.
- In his 1945 book about the Lost Dutchman's mine, Thunder God's Gold, Barry Storm (pen name of John Griffith Climenson) claimed to have narrowly escaped from a mysterious sniper he dubbed "Mr. X". Storm further speculated that Adolph Ruth might have been a victim of the same sniper.
- July 3, 1947, James A Cravey, age 62, a retired photographer, was reported missing after he had chartered a helicopter June 19, 1947, to drop him off in the Superstition Mountains, to look for the Lost Dutchman's Mine. Cravey said he would walk out of the mountains on June 28, 1947. His headless remains were reportedly discovered in the Superstition Mountains in the mid-1940s.
- On November 9, 1949, copper prospector James Kidd went to work in the Superstition Mountains and never returned. He has never been found.
- In February 1951, Oregon physician John Burns was found shot to death in the mountains. About a year later in 1952, Joseph Kelley from Dayton, Ohio, vanished. Two years later, only his skull was found, which contained bullet wounds.
- Charles Massey came from nearby Tucson, accompanied by a few friends, with plans to hunt in the mountains. While in the Superstitions, he became separated from the main party and was never seen alive again. On February 24, 1955, his skeleton was found. Massey had been shot directly between the eyes. A brief year later, the body of Martin G. Zywotho of Brooklyn, New York, was discovered with a bullet hole in the head.
- On March 21, 1961, the body of Walter J. Mowry of Denver, Colorado, was recovered from its resting place near Weaver's Needle. A coroner's jury ruled that his death was caused by a gunshot wound inflicted by a person or persons unknown. That same year, the fully clothed skeleton of Charles Bohen, a Salt Lake City man, was also found. Despite that he was buried in a shallow grave of sand with a bullet hole in his back, his death was officially ruled a "suicide."
- In June 1961, Jay Clapp, a peaceful recluse who lived in a cave in the Superstitions, disappeared. Clapp's headless skeleton was found some three years later, but the cause of death is still "unknown."
- The unidentified skeletal remains of Apache Junction John Doe were found on November 23, 1969. He was found with a gunshot wound to the temple.
- On January 28, 1981, Suzanne Rossetti was kidnapped by two men, Jess James Gillies and Michael Logan, and taken to Fish Creek Hill in the Superstition Mountains, where she was pushed off a 40-foot cliff. Despite begging to be allowed to die in peace, her killers climbed down and struck and buried her alive with rocks. Gillies was executed on January 13, 1999, while Logan was sentenced to life in prison.
- On May 4, 1984, the body of Walt Gassler, a gold prospector who had been searching for (and claimed to have found) the Lost Dutchman, was found by ranch hand, Don Shade. An autopsy showed signs of a heart attack, and in his backpack was gold ore allegedly identical to that found by Jacob Waltz. Due to his ailing health, Walt had previously contacted two other prospectors, one of whom was Robert K. Corbin, Arizona's Attorney General. A few months later, he'd told Bob's partner and local historian, Tom Kollenborn, that he found the Lost Dutchman mine. He disappeared the next day after being dropped off at a local trailhead by his wife. A month after his death, Tom was contacted by someone falsely claiming to be Walt's son, Roland. The man showed him gold similar to that which allegedly came out of the Dutchman mine, and asked Tom for the map and notes to retrace his father's steps. Tom gave him a manuscript and backpack. Months later, Tom was giving a lecture when he was approached by the "real" Roland Gassler, who provided his ID. Additionally, this Roland claimed to never have received the backpack that was found on his father's body, according to the ranch hand and Sheriff's report.
- In 1992, a white male in his late 30s to early 40s was found dead in the Superstition Mountains, slain by two gunshot wounds to the back of the head. His identity remains unknown.
- In early December 2009, 35-year-old Jesse Capen, a Denver native, embarked on what would be his last trip to search for a lost gold mine in the Superstition Wilderness Area. Officials found Capen's white Jeep wagon on Dec. 20, 2009, abandoned at the Upper Tortilla Ranch Windmill. On Dec. 22, 2009, in the area of Indian Springs, Jesse’s camp was found. Capen’s wallet, credit cards, cash, iPod, backpack, food and water were found in his tent. The Maricopa County Sheriff’s Office conducted a search of the area throughout the month of December finding no sign of Capen. Search dogs, SAR members, deputies and a helicopter search the areas marked on a map found in Jesse’s tent. Other campers had seen him along the trail, with 2 – 1 gallon milk jugs of water and little else, stating he didn’t seem suitable for a long hike. Some of the hikers stated they warned him to turn back, according to the Disappeared episode "The Dutchman's Curse" (Season 6, Episode 3). In 2012, Capen’s body was discovered in a crevice.
- On July 11, 2010, Utah hikers Curtis Merworth (49), Ardean Charles (66) and Malcolm Meeks (41) went missing in the Superstition Mountains looking for the mine. Merworth had become lost in the same area in 2009, requiring a rescue. On July 19, the Maricopa County Sheriff's Department called off the search for the lost men. They presumably died in the summer heat. In January 2011, three sets of remains believed to be those of the lost men were recovered.
- On August 12, 2020, local artist Khayman Welch (25) was last seen walking southeast from the parking area at Weaver's Needle Vista Viewpoint near State Route 88 in the Tonto National Forest. That day, he did AC work with his uncle, Brian Welch, and on the way home, the two of them stopped at Weaver's Needle Vista. After telling his uncle he wanted a "better view of the sunset," Khayman walked southeast from the parking lot towards Weaver's Needle. He has not been found.

== Lost Dutchman State Park ==
In 1977, 292 acres (118 ha) abutting the Tonto National Forest were set aside as the Lost Dutchman State Park. The park was expanded to 320 acres (130 ha) in 1983. It is accessible about 40 miles (64.4 km) east of Phoenix via U.S. Highway 60, the Superstition Freeway. Hiking and camping are popular activities. There are several paths that go through the brush and cacti. The short Discovery Trail is a clear route with several placards giving the natural history of the area.

== In popular culture ==
- Lost Dutchman's Mine is a text adventure game by the Programmer's Guild written in Applesoft BASIC. The source code appeared as a type-in program in BYTE in 1980 and 1981.
- Al Emmo and the Lost Dutchman's Mine is a 2006 adventure game based loosely around the myth of the Lost Dutchman's Gold; the protagonist, Al Emmo, sets out to locate the mine and recover its riches for Rita Peralto.
- Lust for Gold is a 1949 Western film about the mine based on Storm's book.
- "Dutchman's Gold" was a chart hit in 1960 for Walter Brennan.
- "When the Man Comes, Follow Him" episode of the CBS Radio series Escape aired on April 9, 1949.
- "The Peralta Map" episode of the CBS Radio series Suspense aired on March 10, 1957.
- An episode of the 1970s program In Search Of... treats the legend of the mine.
- Lost Dutchman Mine, a 1989 video game for various platforms.
- The Lost Dutchman Mine ride was a popular attraction at Legend City amusement park (Tempe, AZ 1963–1983)
- The Lost Dutchman's Mine features prominently in the Lara Croft, Tomb Raider three-part graphic series entitled "The Black Legion", published between December 2003 and March 2004.

== See also ==
- Beale ciphers
