= Superstition Mountains =

Landform near Phoenix, Arizona

- Location within Arizona

Highest point
- Peak: Superstition Mountain, 33°24′40″N 111°24′03″W
- Elevation: NAVD 88
- Prominence: 1,817 ft (554 m)
- Coordinates: 33°28′41″N 111°14′20″W

Geography
- State: Arizona

Superstition Wilderness
- Wi:kchsawa
- IUCN category Ib (wilderness area)
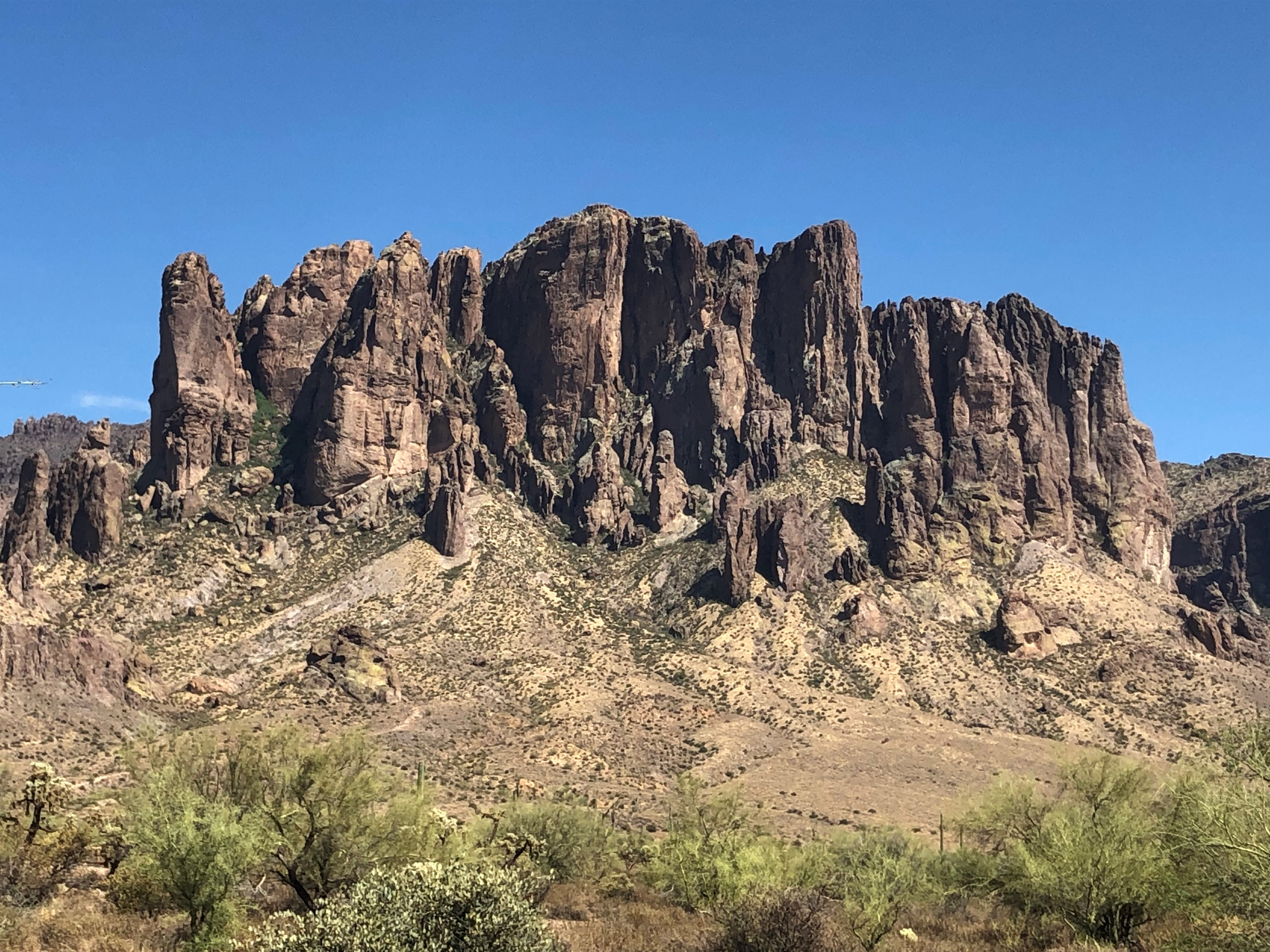
- Praying Hands Formation
- Interactive map of Superstition Wilderness
- Location: Maricopa / Pinal / Gila counties, Arizona, US
- Nearest city: Apache Junction, Arizona
- Coordinates: 33°28′41″N 111°14′20″W
- Area: 159,757 acres (646.51 km^{2})
- Established: 1939
- Governing body: United States Forest Service

The Superstition Mountains (Yavapai: Wi:kchsawa) is a range of mountains in Arizona located to the east of the Phoenix metropolitan area. They are anchored by Superstition Mountain, a large mountain that is a popular recreation destination for residents of the Phoenix, Arizona, area. They are roughly bounded by U.S. Route 60 on the south, Arizona State Route 88 on the northwest, and Arizona State Route 188 on the northeast.

== History and description ==
The mountains were once known in Spanish as Sierra de la Espuma ("Foam Mountain").

The range has a maximum elevation of 6,266 ft (1,910 m) and prominence of 1,706 ft (520 m) at Mound Mountain in the far eastern section of the range.

The mountains are in the federally designated Superstition Wilderness and include a variety of natural features in addition to its namesake mountain. Weavers Needle, a prominent landmark and rock climbing destination set behind and to the east of Superstition Mountain, is a tall eroded volcanic remnant that plays a significant role in the legend of the Lost Dutchman's Gold Mine. Numerous hiking trails cross the mountains from multiple access points, including the Peralta Trailhead, the most popular. Peralta Canyon, on the northeast side of Superstition Mountain, contains a popular trail that leads up to Fremont Saddle, which provides a view of Weavers Needle. Miner's Needle is another prominent formation in the wilderness and a popular hiking destination. Lost Dutchman State Park, located on the west side of Superstition Mountain, includes several short hiking and mountain bike trails.

Circlestone includes ancient stone monuments.

As with most of the terrain surrounding the Phoenix metropolitan area, the Superstition Mountains have a desert climate, with high summer temperatures and a handful of perennial sources of water. The elevation in the more remote, eastern portion of the wilderness is higher than the western portion, which lowers temperatures slightly.

== Legends ==
The legend of the Lost Dutchman's Gold Mine centers around the Superstition Mountains. According to the legend, a German immigrant named Jacob Waltz discovered a mother lode of gold in the Superstition Wilderness and revealed its location on his deathbed in Phoenix in 1891 to Julia Thomas, a boarding-house owner who had taken care of him for many years. Several mines have been claimed to be the actual mine that Waltz discovered, but none of those claims have been verified. Waltz was a miner at Vulture Mine, where he likely stole the gold and came up with the secret mine to explain his theft. The legends and lore of the Superstition Mountains can be experienced at the Superstition Mountain Museum on the Apache Trail where artifacts of the Lost Dutchman are on display.

Some Apaches believe that the hole leading down into the lower world, or hell, is located in the Superstition Mountains. Winds blowing from the hole are supposed to be the cause of severe dust storms in the metropolitan region.

== Nearby towns and cities ==
- Apache Junction, Arizona
- Gold Canyon, Arizona
- Mesa, Arizona
- Superior, Arizona
- Tortilla Flat, Arizona

== Gallery ==
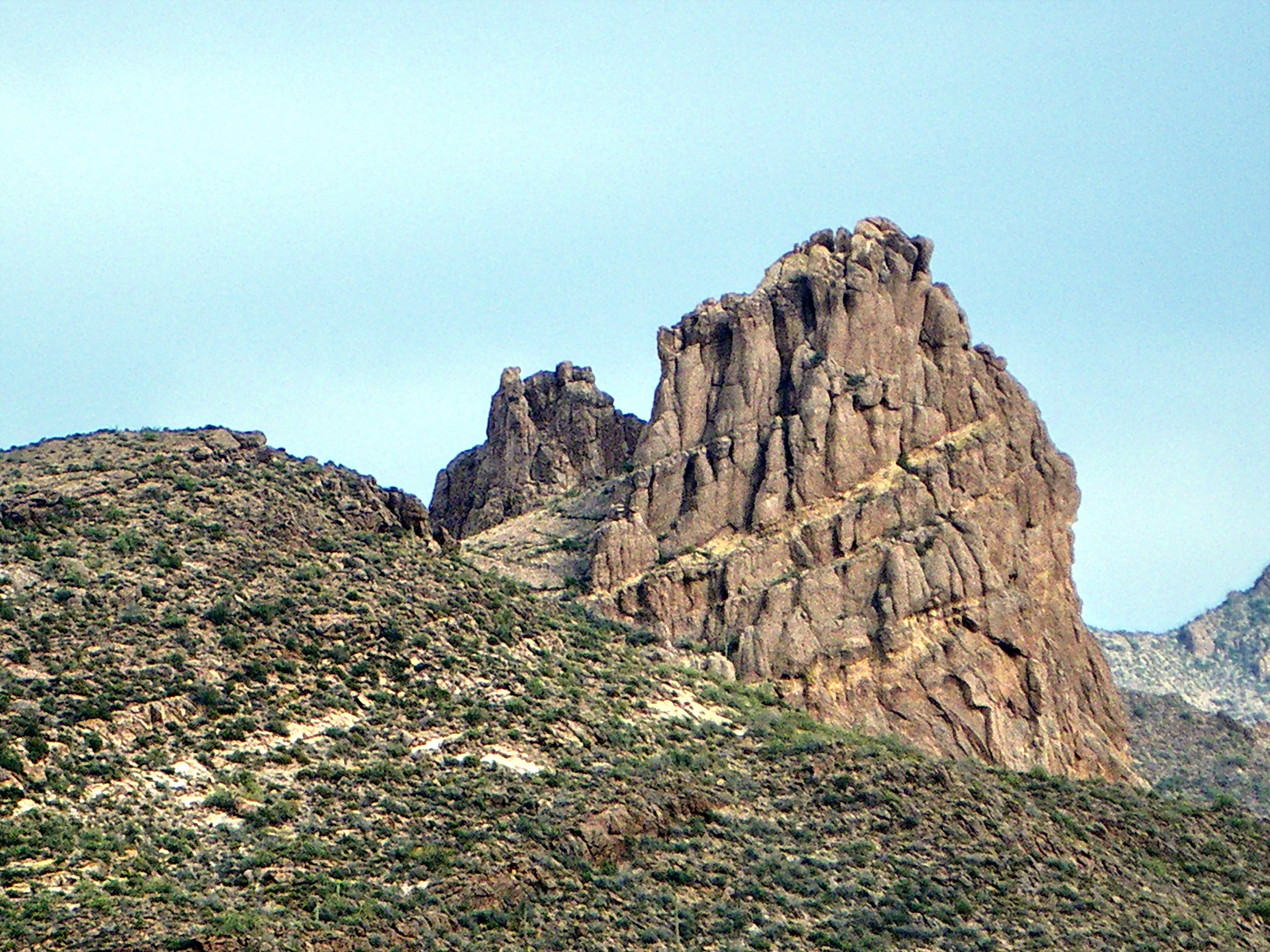
Miners Needle from Bluff Spring Trail. Note prominent bedding planes in the volcanics. (2010)

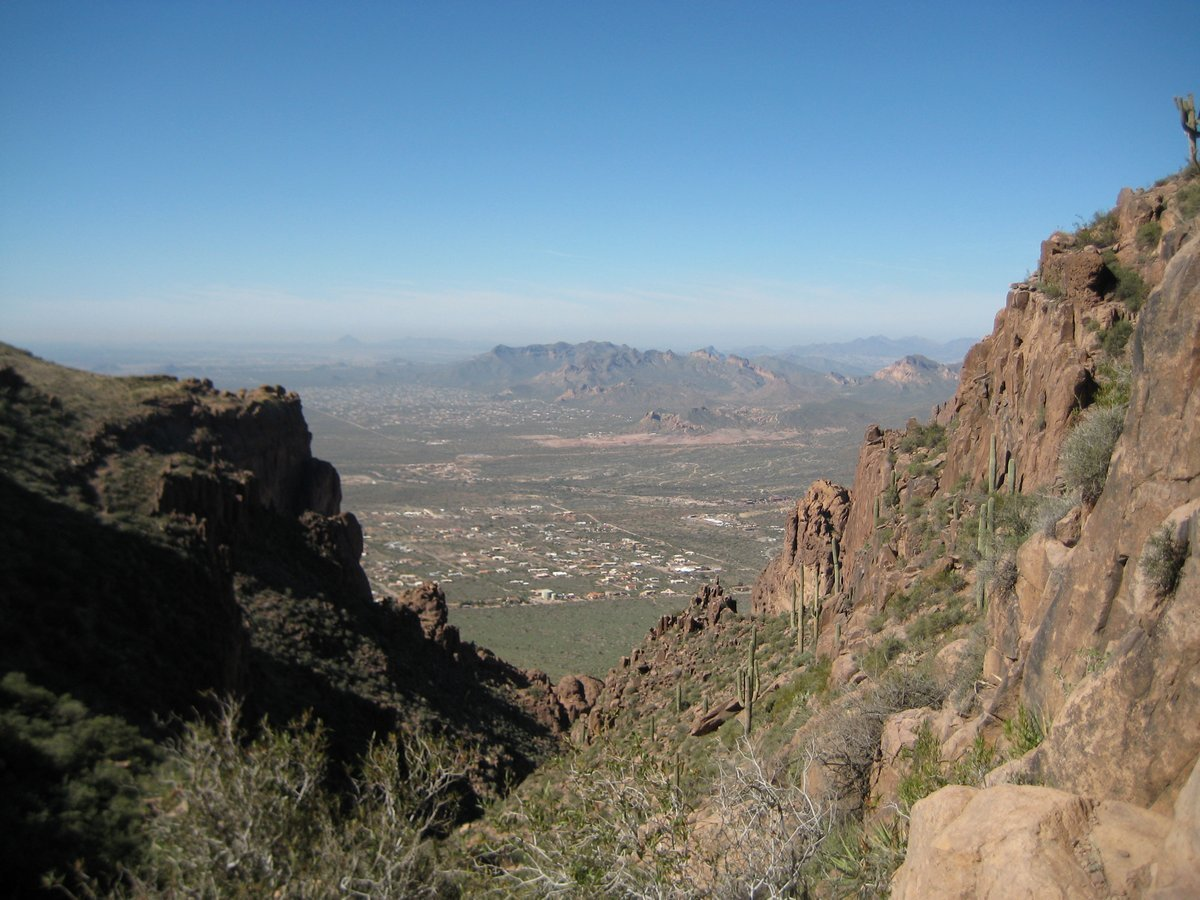
View from the Flatiron hiking trail (2008)

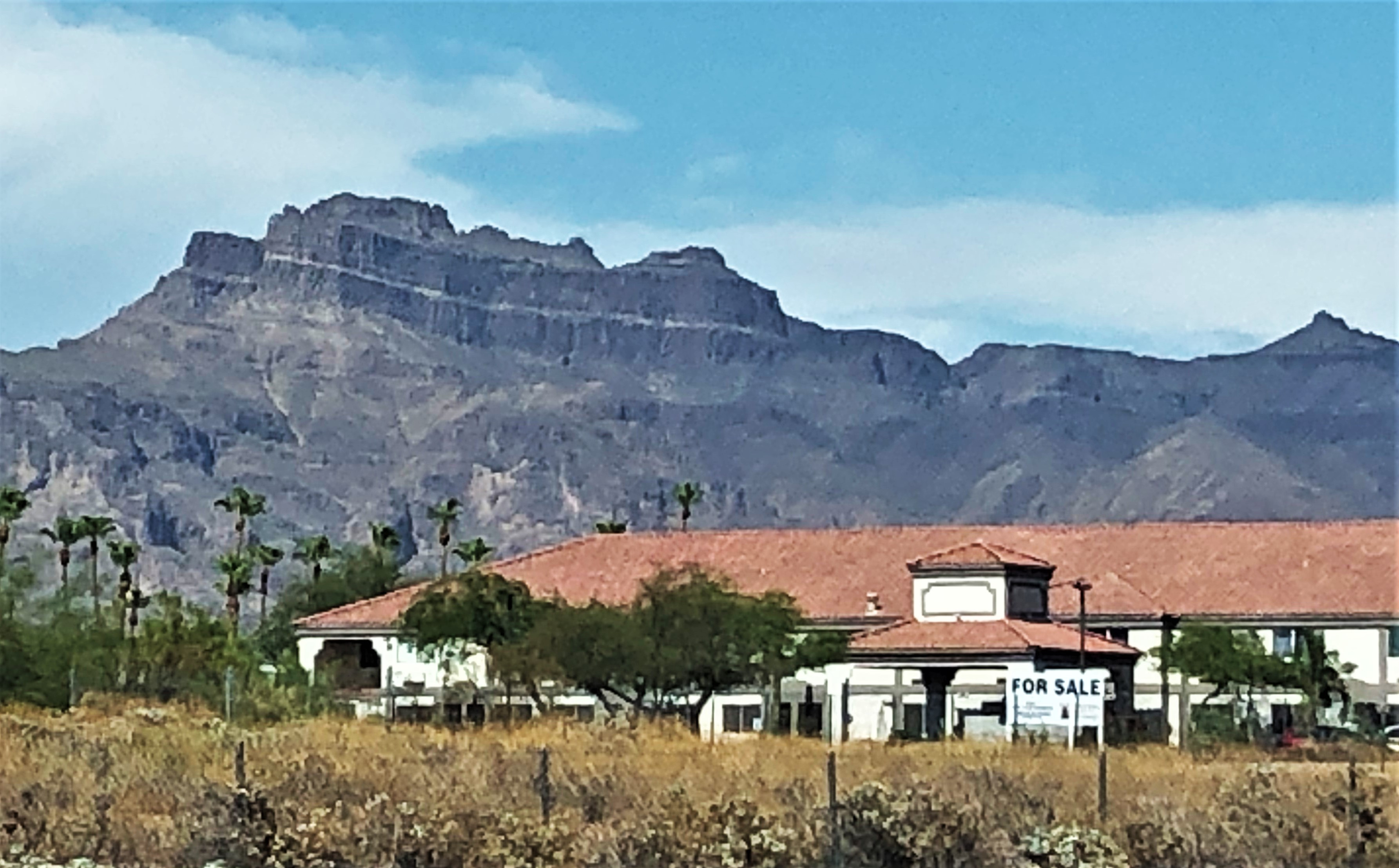
Superstition Mountains From Route 60 at Apache Junction (2021)

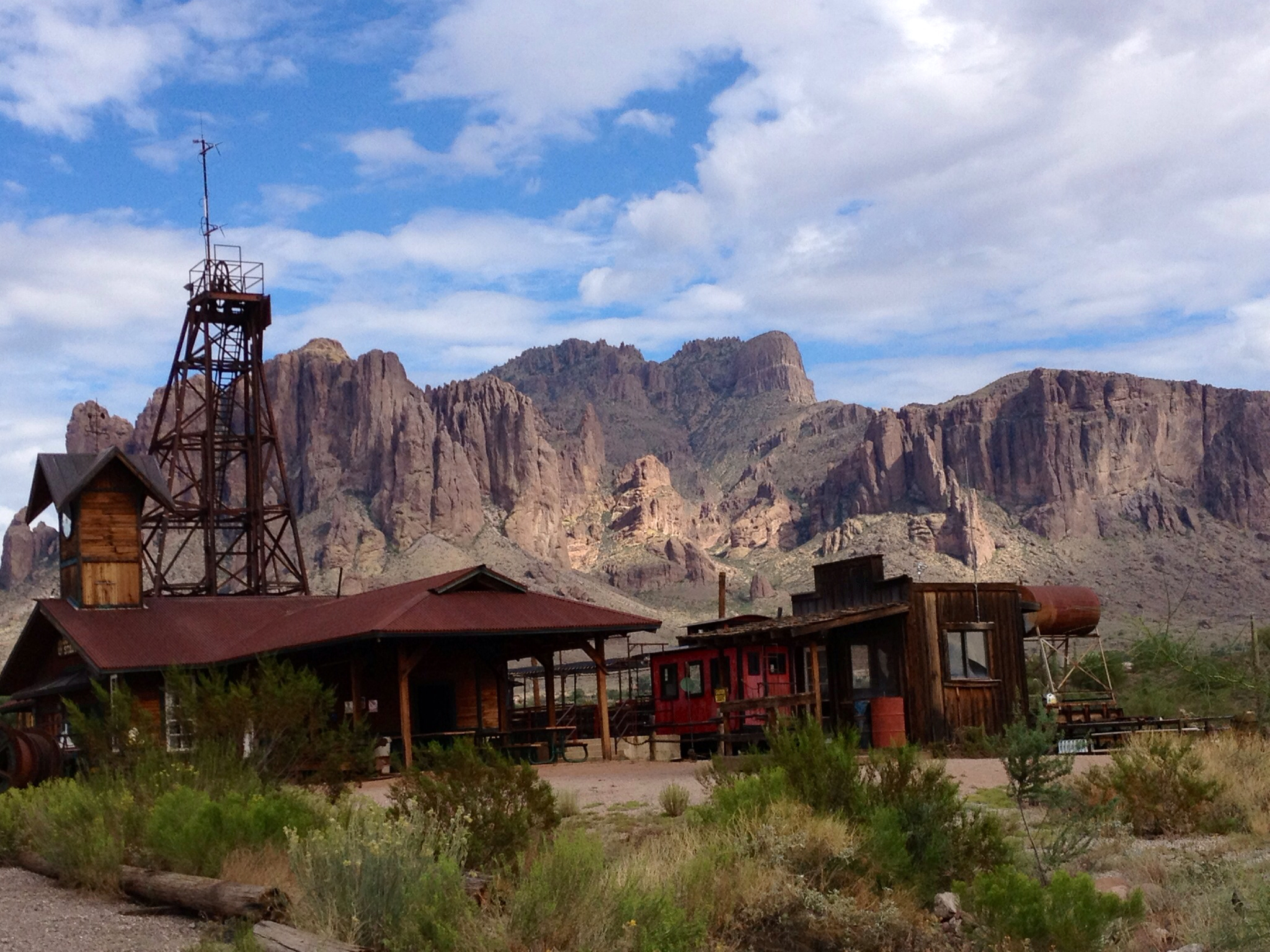
Mining – of gold, silver and especially copper – has historically been an economically significant activity in the mountains (2014)

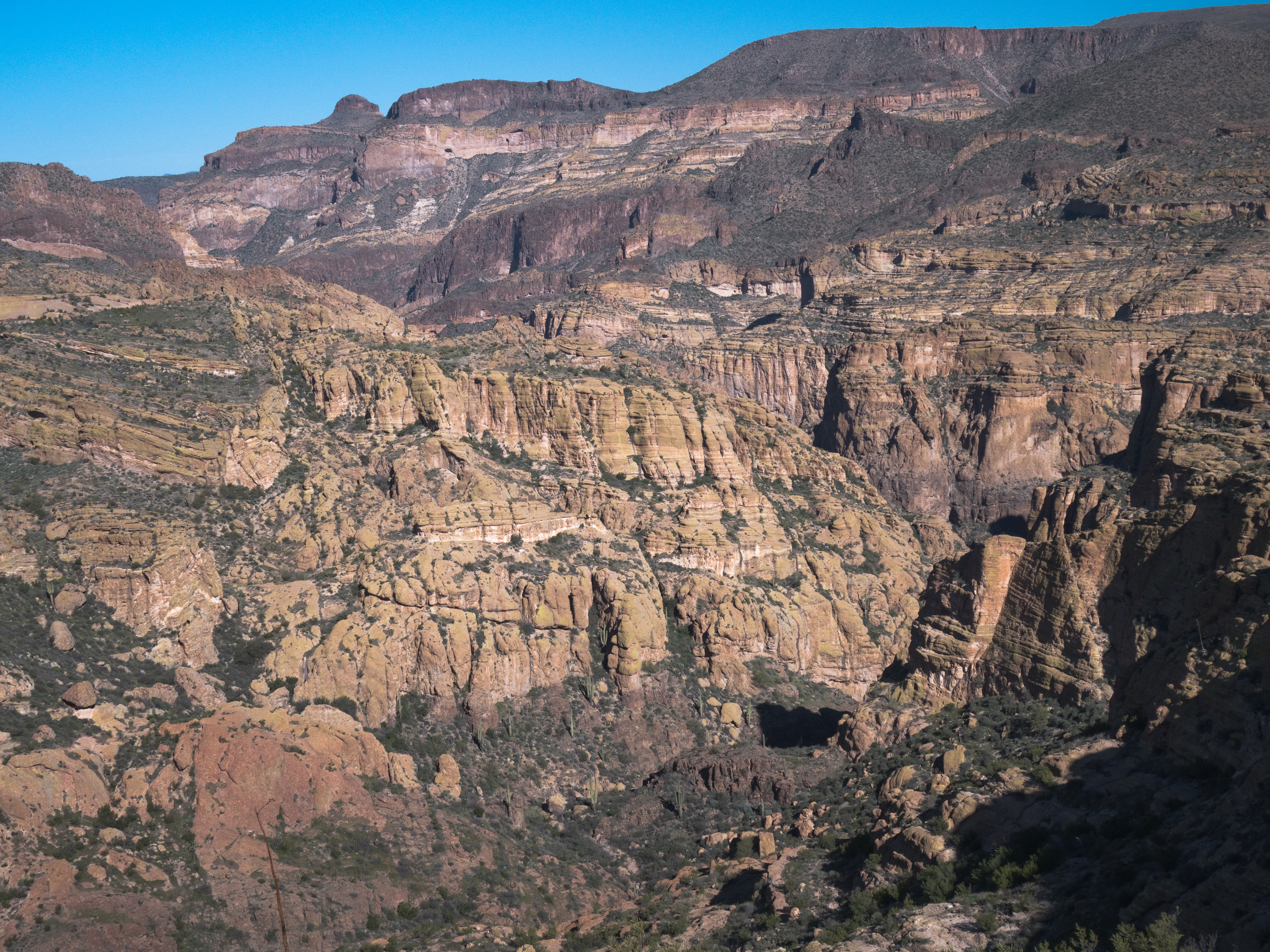
A view from the Apache Trail (Arizona State Route 88) in 2016

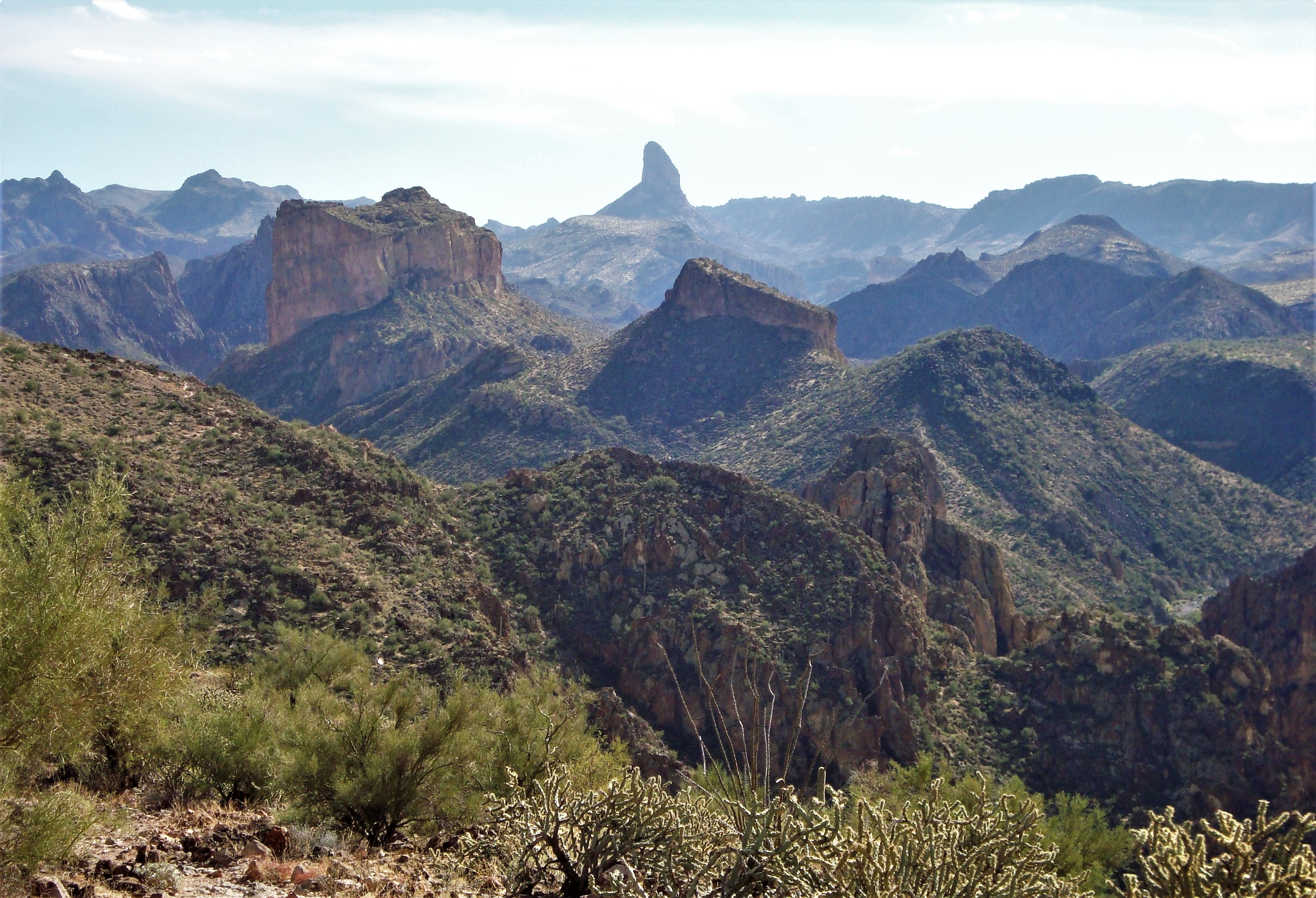
Boulder Canyon Trail – Weaver's Needle in distance (2011)

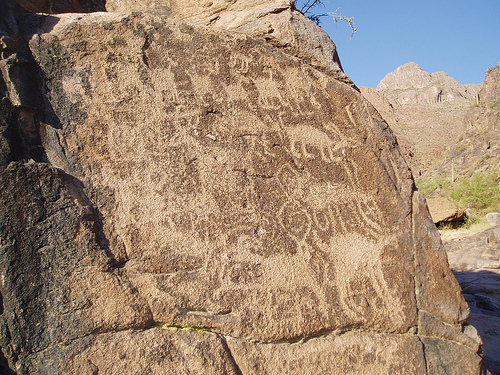
Petroglyphs in Superstition Wilderness (2007)

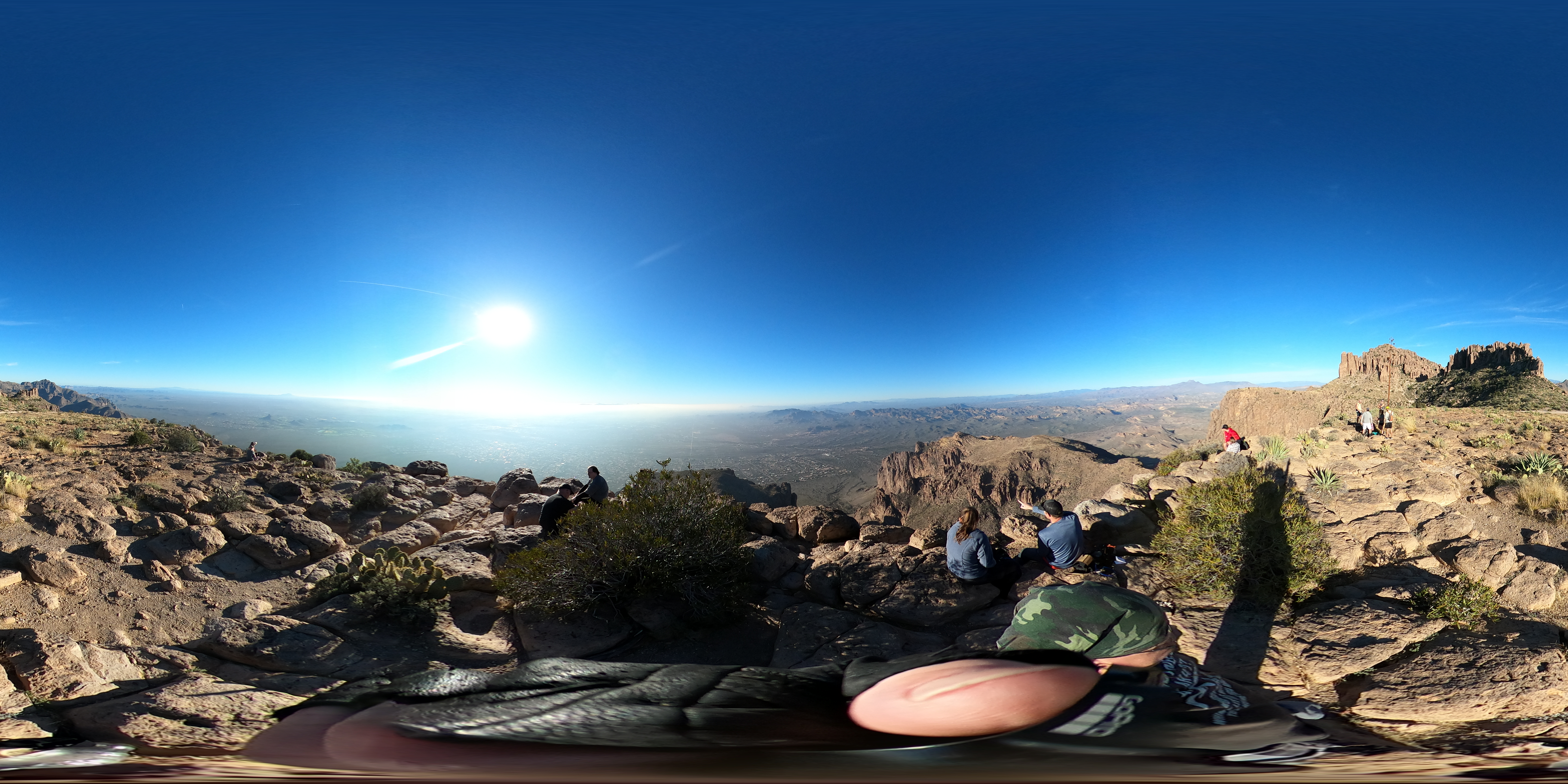
panorama, taken from Flatiron, in the Superstition mountains.

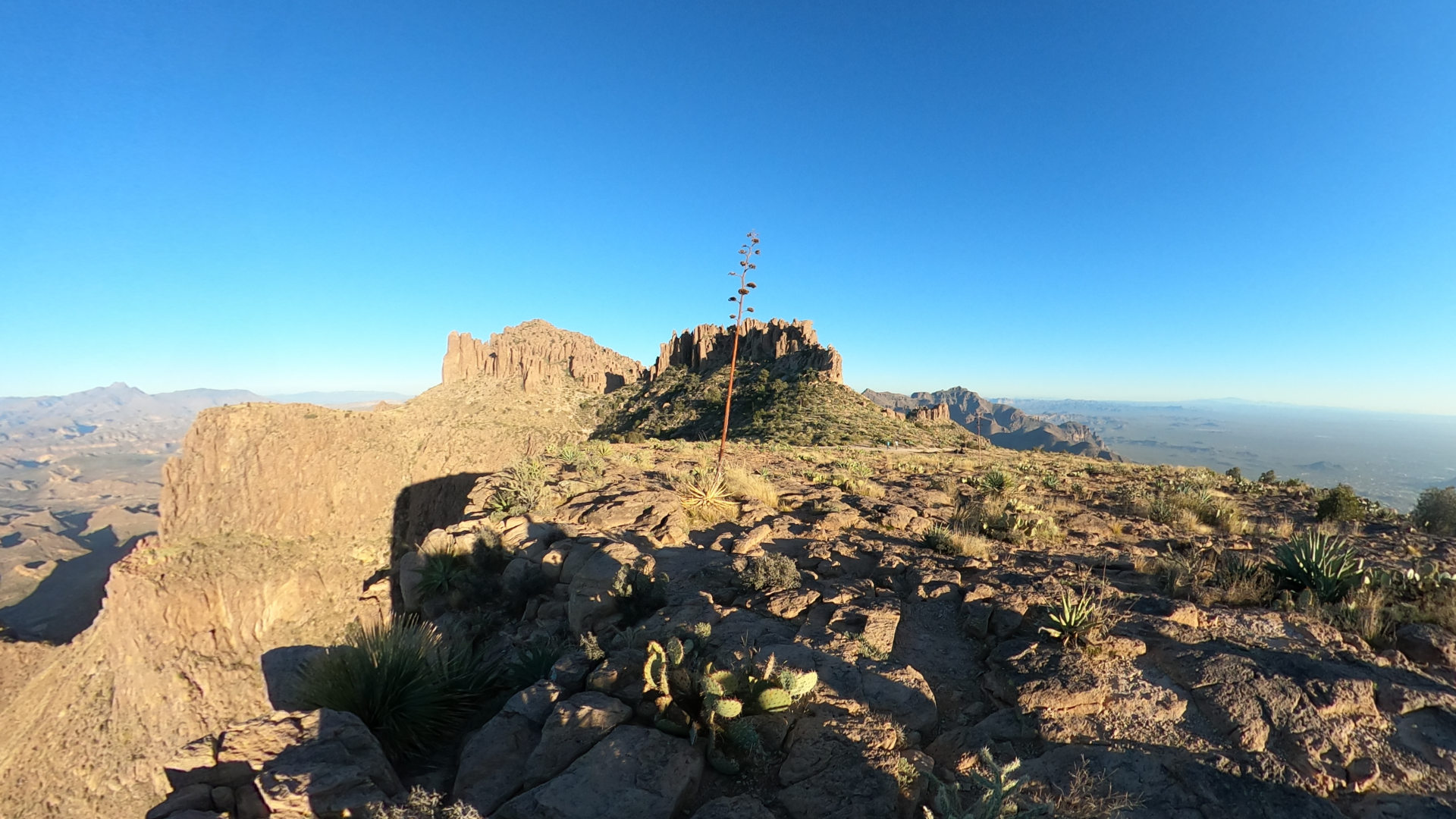
Ironview Peak (peak 5024), background, left

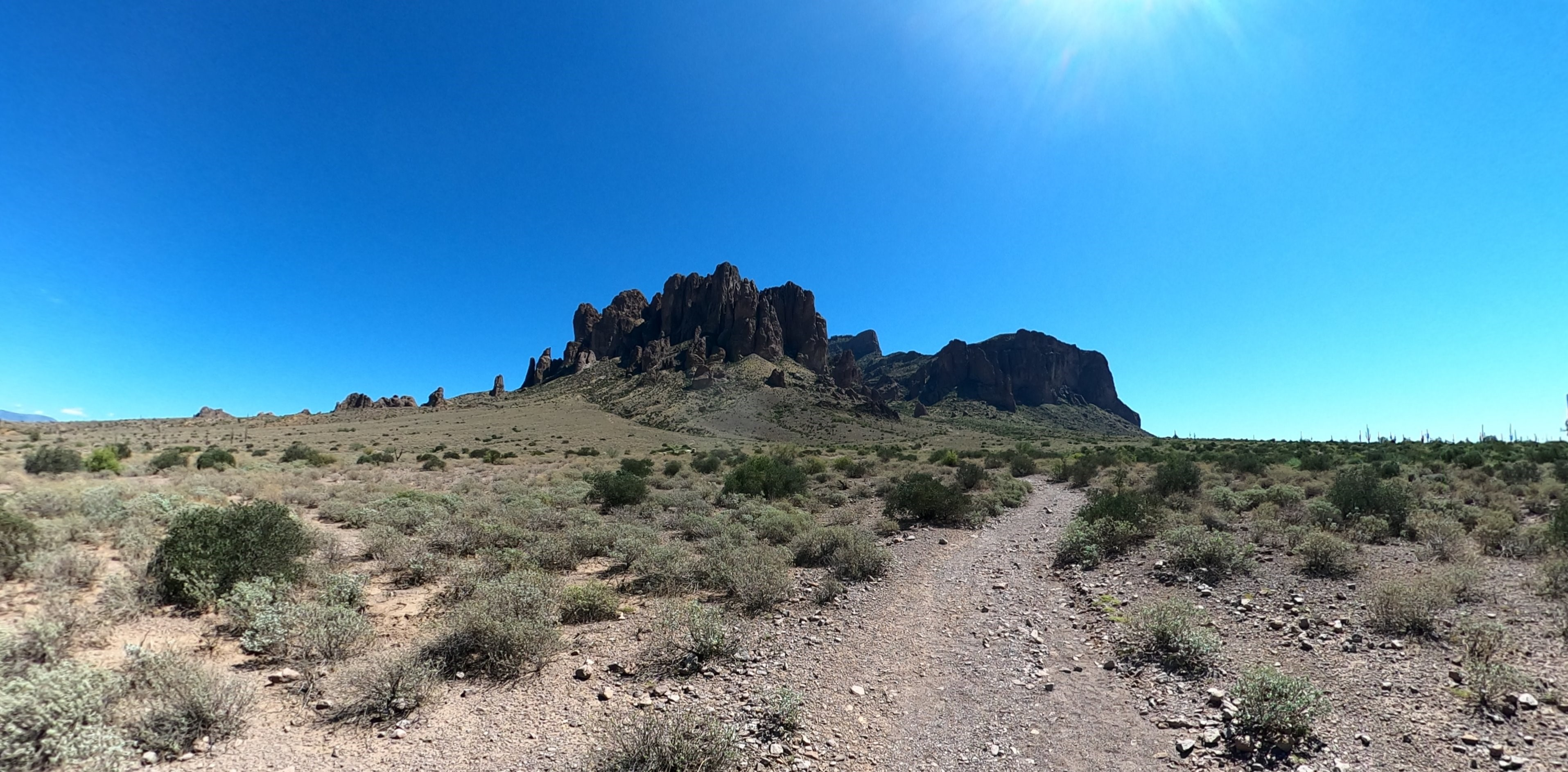
Western Superstition mountains, viewed from Siphon Draw trail.

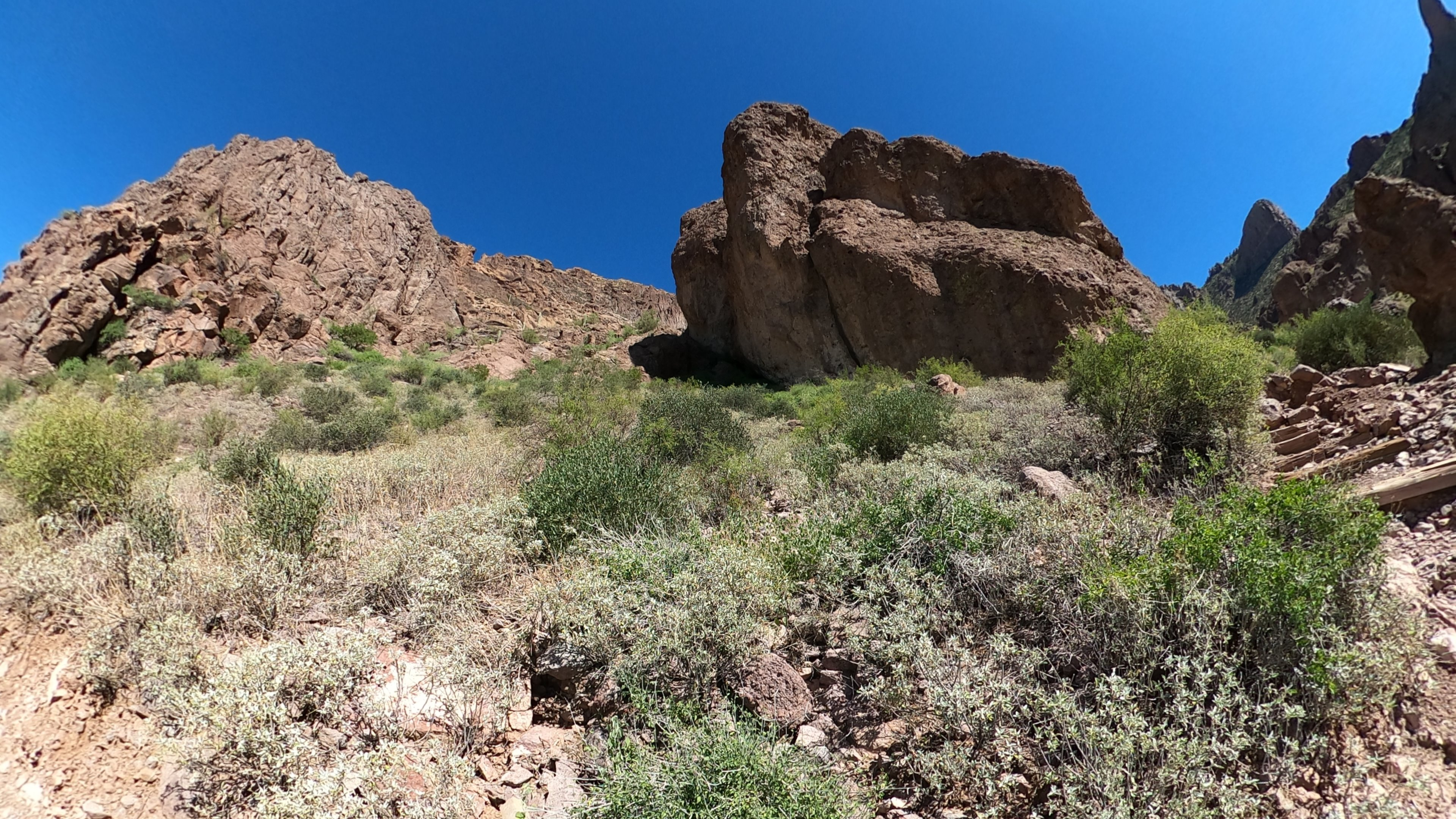
Rock formations, Siphon Draw trail.

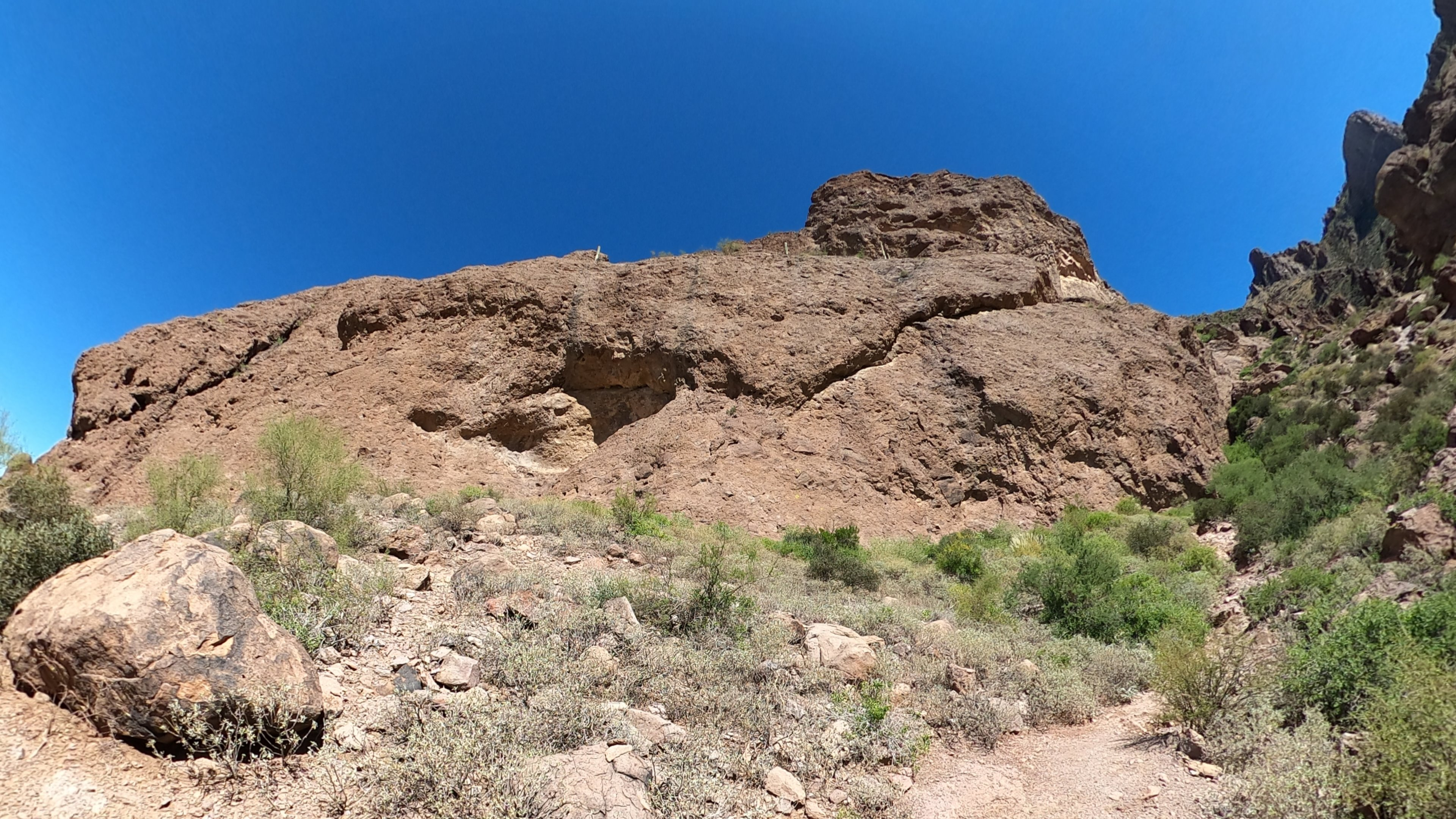
Rock formation, Siphon Draw trail.

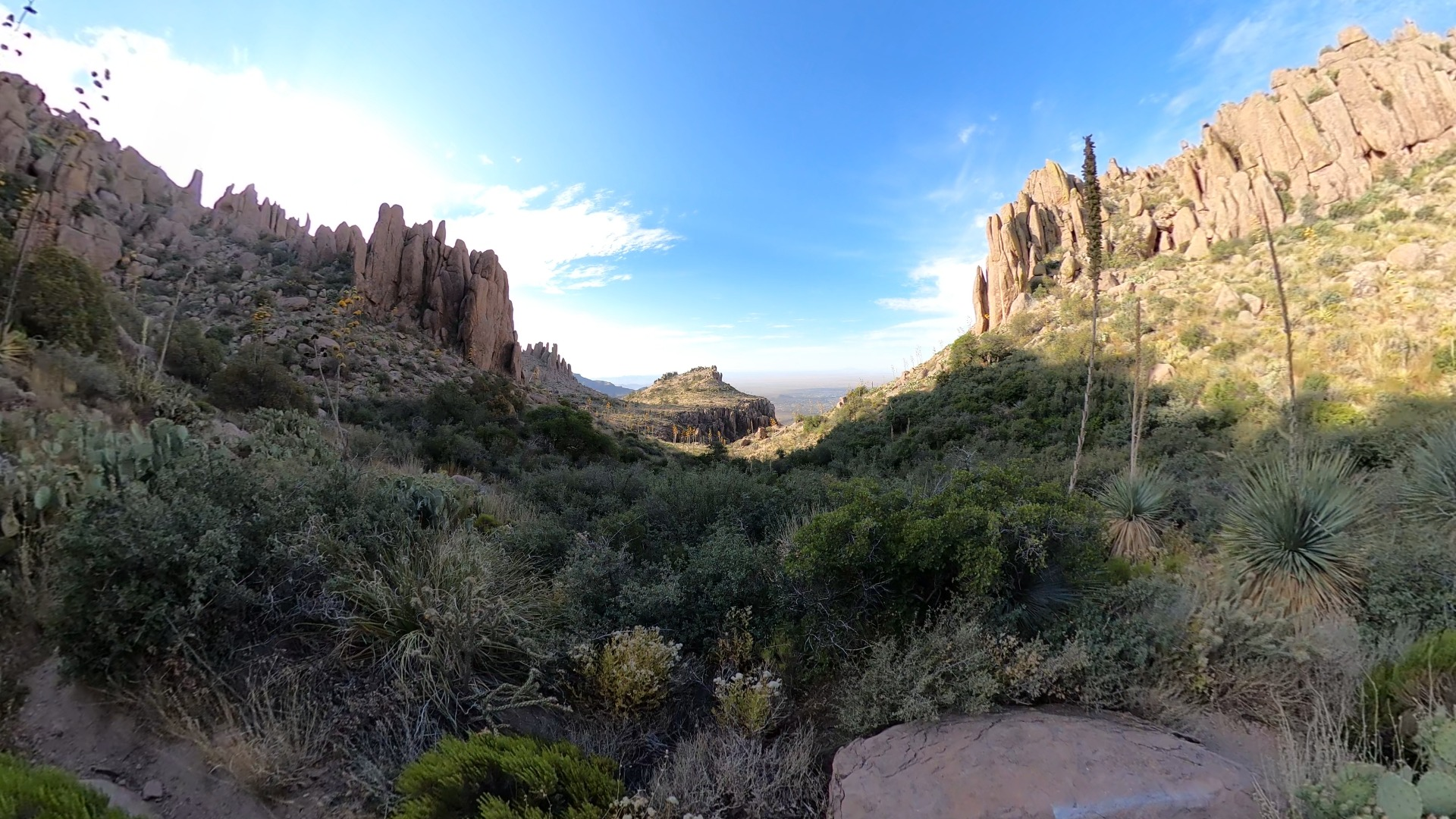
view from Superstition Ridgeline Trail

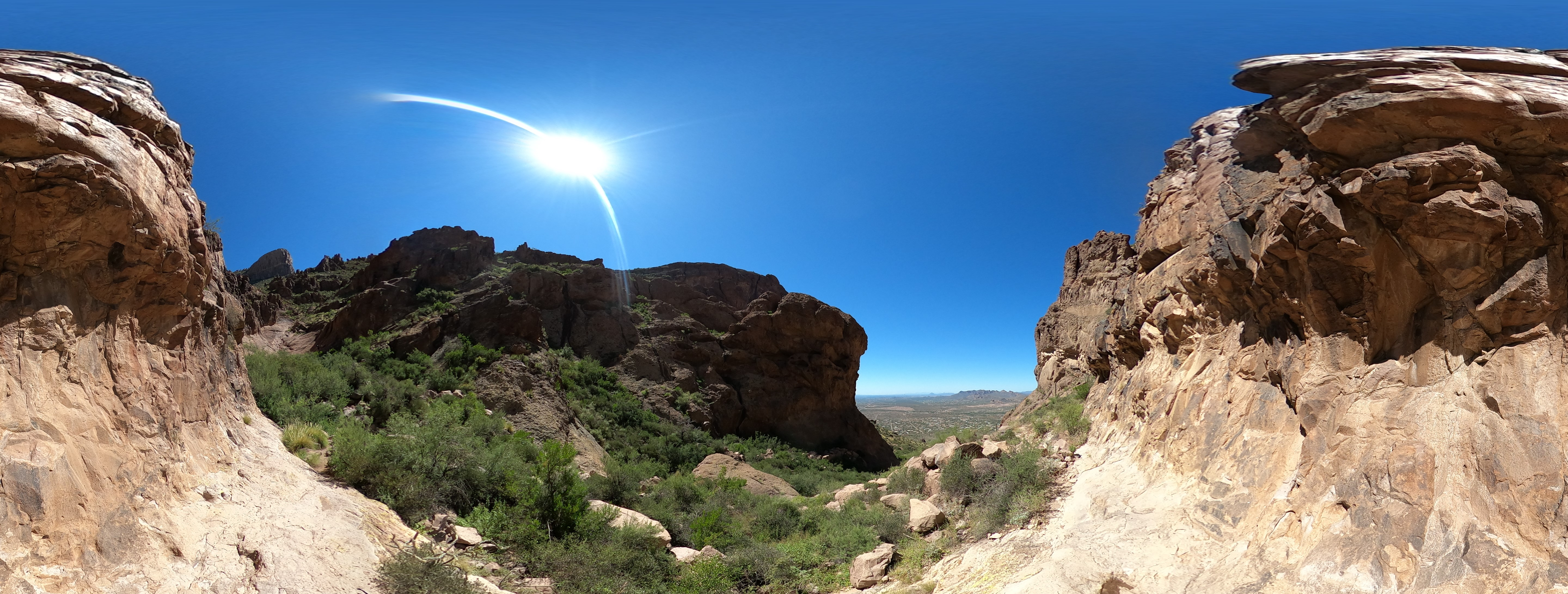
Panoramic view from Siphon Draw, basin area. .

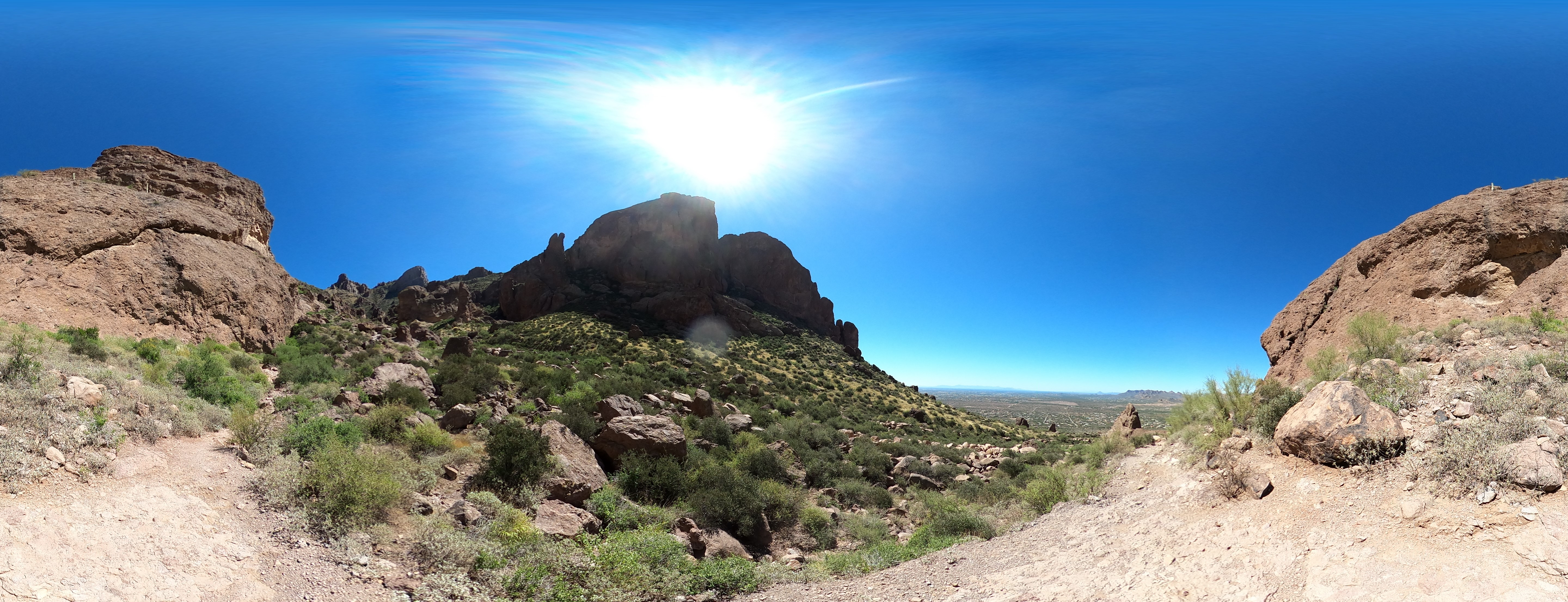
Panoramic view from Siphon Draw Trail.

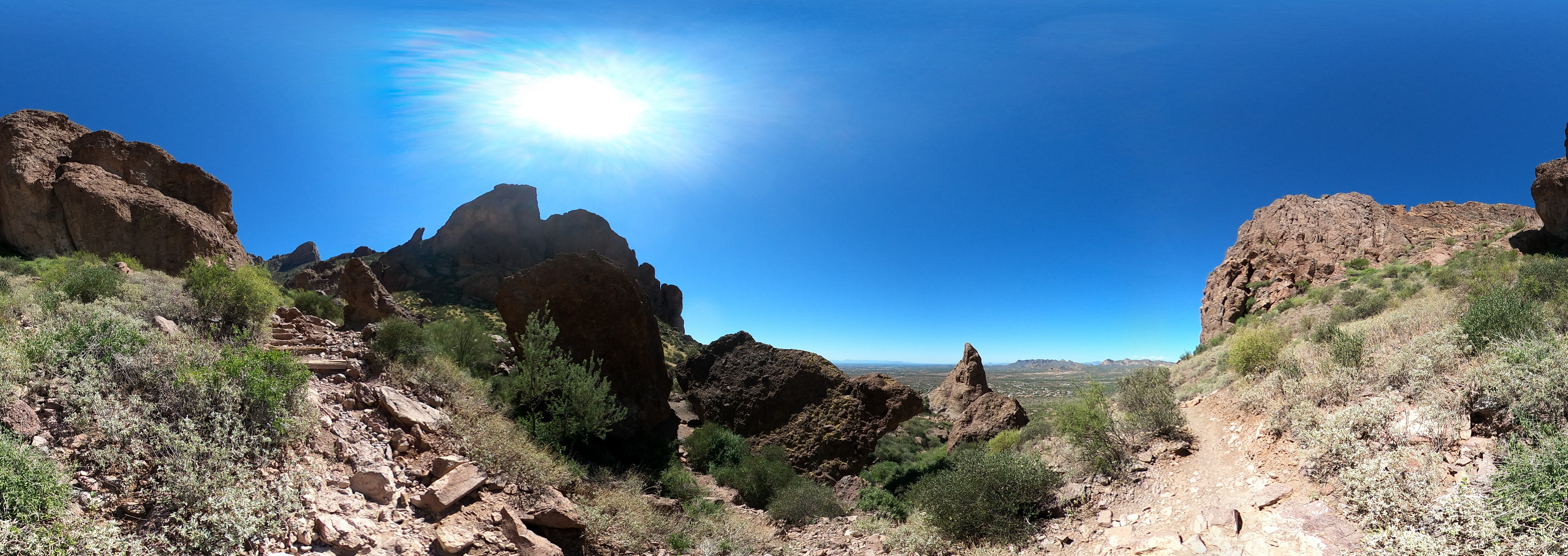
Panoramic view from Siphon Draw Trail.

== See also ==
- List of wilderness areas of the United States
- List of mountain ranges of Arizona
- Wilderness Act
