= Storms House =

Storms House may refer to:

- Storms House in Wickenburg, Arizona, listed on the National Register of Historic Places in Maricopa County, Arizona
- Storms House in Franklin Lakes, New Jersey, listed on the National Register of Historic Places in Bergen County, New Jersey
