= National Register of Historic Places listings in Maricopa County, Arizona =

Location of Maricopa County in Arizona

The following properties and districts are listed on the National Register of Historic Places in Maricopa County, Arizona, United States, excluding listings in Phoenix. The locations of National Register properties and districts for which the latitude and longitude coordinates are included below, may be seen in a map.

There are 438 properties and districts listed on the National Register in the county, including 3 that are also National Historic Landmarks. The city of Phoenix is the location of 233 of these properties and districts, including 1 National Historic Landmark; the 204 properties and districts and 2 National Historic Landmarks located elsewhere in the county are listed here.

This National Park Service list is complete through NPS recent listings posted October 23, 2026.

== Current listings ==
	Name on the Register	Image	Date listed	Location	City or town	Description
1	1931 Tempe Bridge	1931 Tempe Bridge	August 13, 1981 (#81000137)	Mill Ave. 33°25′49″N 111°56′22″W	Tempe	The first of the two Mill Avenue Bridges
2	59th Avenue Residential Historic District	59th Avenue Residential Historic District	September 6, 2006 (#06000767)	Western side of 59th Ave. between Orangewood Ave. and Frier Dr. 33°32′53″N 112°11′11″W	Glendale	The District represents early rural development where homes were built on large, split lots.
3	Administration/Science Building	Administration/Science Building	September 4, 1985 (#85002169)	Arizona State University campus (Building 11); 33°25′15″N 111°55′57″W	Tempe	Originally Science Hall, now University Club
4	Alchesay Canyon Bridge	Alchesay Canyon Bridge	September 30, 1988 (#88001615)	State Route 88 over Alchesay Canyon at milepost 241.1; 33°40′05″N 111°09′30″W	Roosevelt	
5	Alhambra Hotel	Alhambra Hotel	July 31, 1991 (#91000982)	43 S. Macdonald; 33°24′51″N 111°49′59″W	Mesa	Mesa’s longest operating place of lodging. This location is one of the stops on the Ghost Tour and Historical Walk.
6	Alma Ward Meeting House	Alma Ward Meeting House	April 4, 2006 (#05001198)	809 W. Main St. 33°25′00″N 111°50′55″W	Mesa	Three buildings which played a role in the formation of religious and educational development in Mesa.
7	Dr. Lucius Charles Alston House	Dr. Lucius Charles Alston House	May 1, 2012 (#12000240)	453 N. Pima St. 33°25′26″N 111°49′49″W	Mesa	Home of Dr. Lucius Charles Alston, the first African American doctor in Mesa.
8	Ammo Bunker (S-1007)	Ammo Bunker (S-1007)	June 19, 1995 (#95000748)	Southwest of Vosler Dr. at the Arizona State University Polytechnic campus 33°17′43″N 111°40′43″W	Mesa	
9	Ammo Bunker (S-1008)	Ammo Bunker (S-1008)	June 19, 1995 (#95000759)	Southwest of Vosler Dr. at the Arizona State University Polytechnic campus 33°17′39″N 111°40′40″W	Mesa	A good illustration of a typical utilitarian military support structure constructed at military bases in the United States during World War II.
10	Andre Building	Andre Building	August 10, 1979 (#79000419)	401-403 S. Mill Ave. 33°25′34″N 111°56′20″W	Tempe	A classic revival building re-built in 1893 after the original burned.
11	Angulo-Hostetter House	Angulo-Hostetter House	October 31, 2000 (#00001266)	150 North Wilbur; 33°25′09″N 111°49′28″W	Mesa	A Colonial Revival home, constructed in 1902 with a 1938 addition, showing many Victorian features.
12	Archeological Site No. AZ U:10:20(ASU)		July 3, 1995 (#95000750)	Address Restricted	Mesa	Southwest Germann Site
13	Archeological Site No. AZ U:10:25(ASU)		July 3, 1995 (#95000751)	Address Restricted	Mesa	Will E Coyote Site
14	Azatlan Archeological Site		November 20, 1995 (#95001283)	Address Restricted	Rio Verde Estates	
15	B. B. Moeur Activity Building	B. B. Moeur Activity Building	September 11, 1985 (#85002171)	Arizona State University campus (Building 37); 33°25′04″N 111°56′07″W	Tempe	Built in 1939 by the WPA as a women's activity center, this Federal Moderne style building is now home to the Mars Space Flight Facility.
16	Bartlett Dam	Bartlett Dam	August 7, 2017 (#100001406)	On the Verde River approximately 50 miles east-northeast of Phoenix; 33°49′08″N 111°37′54″W	Carefree	
17	Beet Sugar Factory	Beet Sugar Factory	January 30, 1978 (#78000548)	5243 W. Glendale Ave. 33°32′15″N 112°10′16″W	Glendale	Structure built in 1910
18	Borden Homes Historic District	Borden Homes Historic District	February 3, 2012 (#11001072)	1000-1100 blocks of S. Una & S. Butte Aves., & 1600-1700 blocks of E. 12th St. 33°24′58″N 111°54′42″W	Tempe	One of the earliest post-war neighborhoods in Tempe.
19	Borden Milk Co. Creamery and Ice Factory	Borden Milk Co. Creamery and Ice Factory	October 10, 1984 (#84000171)	1300-1360 E. 8th St. 33°25′10″N 111°54′54″W	Tempe	Originally built in 1892, the current Mission Revival architecture of the old creamery dates from 1927.
20	Boulder Creek Bridge	Boulder Creek Bridge	March 31, 1989 (#88001599)	State Route 88 over Boulder Creek; 33°32′01″N 111°25′23″W	Tortilla Flat	
21	Brazaletes Pueblo Site		January 17, 1975 (#75000349)	Address Restricted	Carefree	A large masonry pueblo north of Phoenix.
22	Buckeye Union High School A-Wing	Buckeye Union High School A-Wing	December 30, 2009 (#09001160)	902 E. Eason Ave. 33°22′24″N 112°34′39″W	Buckeye	
23	Buckeye Woman's Club	Buckeye Woman's Club	June 4, 2021 (#100006596)	845 Monroe Ave. 33°22′14″N 112°34′41″W	Buckeye	
24	Buckhorn Baths Motel	Buckhorn Baths Motel	May 10, 2005 (#05000421)	5900 E. Main St. 33°25′00″N 111°42′04″W	Mesa	A complex consisting of eleven Pueblo Revival style buildings and seven structures, including a main building, a bathhouse, cottages, and a motel building.
25	E.C. Bunch House	E.C. Bunch House	March 5, 2008 (#08000123)	5602 W. Lamar Rd. 33°32′13″N 112°10′47″W	Glendale	A rare intact house built in 1898 in the Victorian folk-style architecture.
26	Cactus Inn	Cactus Inn	July 10, 1986 (#86001576)	158 Yavapai; 33°58′06″N 112°44′01″W	Wickenburg	
27	Cashion Archeological Site		December 19, 1978 (#78000547)	Address Restricted	Cashion	
28	Cave Creek Service Station	Cave Creek Service Station	September 22, 2000 (#00001126)	6141 Cave Creek Rd. 33°49′55″N 111°56′51″W	Cave Creek	
29	Central School	Central School	May 12, 1982 (#82002080)	10304 N. 83rd Ave. 33°34′43″N 112°14′17″W	Peoria	The Peoria Central School was a two-room school built in 1906. It is currently occupied by the Peoria Arizona Historical Society Museum.
30	Chandler Commercial Historic District	Chandler Commercial Historic District	September 22, 2000 (#00001127)	Roughly bounded by Boston, Oregon, Buffalo, and Washington Sts. 33°18′11″N 111°50′30″W	Chandler	
31	Chandler High School	Chandler High School	November 20, 2007 (#07000836)	350 N. Arizona Ave. 33°18′30″N 111°50′32″W	Chandler	
32	City Hall and Jail	City Hall and Jail	July 10, 1986 (#86001577)	117 Yavapai; 33°58′13″N 112°43′48″W	Wickenburg	
33	Civil Engineering Maintenance Shop	Civil Engineering Maintenance Shop	June 19, 1995 (#95000747)	Northeastern corner of Unity Ave. (once known as Jct. of 11th and A Sts.), at the Arizona State University Polytechnic campus (formerly Williams Air Force Base). 33°18′14″N 111°40′45″W	Mesa	
34	Connor-Harold House		May 8, 2023 (#100008908)	5729 North Palo Cristi Rd. 33°31′21″N 112°00′14″W	Paradise Valley	
35	Date Palm Manor Historic District	Date Palm Manor Historic District	December 15, 2015 (#15000883)	2024-2106 S. Mill Ave, 5-1377 W. Palmcroft, 32-121 W. Palmdale, 2019-2025 S. Dateland & 2015-2030 Dromedary Drs. 33°24′21″N 111°56′28″W	Tempe	
36	Demountable Hangar	Demountable Hangar	June 19, 1995 (#95000743)	North Apron of Phoenix-Mesa Gateway Airport (formally Williams Air Force Base). 33°18′40″N 111°40′11″W	Mesa	
37	Dome House	Dome House	March 15, 2018 (#100002208)	7199 E. Grapevine Rd. 33°49′53″N 111°55′35″W	Cave Creek	
38	George O. Dowdy Rental Cottage	George O. Dowdy Rental Cottage	April 30, 2009 (#09000246)	6818 N. 60th Ave. 33°32′15″N 112°11′21″W	Glendale	Built in 1926
39	Rose Eisendrath House	Rose Eisendrath House	April 20, 2011 (#11000206)	1400 N. College Ave. 33°26′36″N 111°55′57″W	Tempe	1930 Pueblo Revival house built by noted Arizona architect Robert T. Evans
40	Elias-Rodriguez House	Elias-Rodriguez House	May 7, 1984 (#84000684)	927 E. 8th St. 33°25′45″N 111°55′25″W	Tempe	
41	Elliott House	Elliott House	May 7, 1984 (#84000693)	1010 Maple Ave. 33°25′06″N 111°56′26″W	Tempe	
42	George Ellis House	George Ellis House	September 3, 1999 (#99001065)	105 Cattle Track; 33°31′32″N 111°54′57″W	Scottsdale	
43	Evergreen Historic District	Evergreen Historic District	July 5, 1999 (#99000706)	Roughly between Country Club and Macdonald, north of University Dr. to 8th St. 33°25′34″N 111°50′05″W	Mesa	
44	Falcon Field World War II Aviation Hangars	Falcon Field World War II Aviation Hangars	May 19, 2016 (#16000266)	4800 E. Falcon Dr. (Falcon Field); 33°27′23″N 111°43′39″W	Mesa	Historic Falcon Field Hangars Plaque
45	Farmer-Goodwin House	Farmer-Goodwin House	December 26, 1972 (#72000197)	820 Farmer Ave. 33°25′17″N 111°57′08″W	Tempe	
46	First Methodist Episcopal Church of Glendale Sanctuary	First Methodist Episcopal Church of Glendale Sanctuary	January 11, 2006 (#05001502)	7102 N. 58th Dr. 33°32′24″N 112°11′04″W	Glendale	Church built in 1926
47	First National Bank of Glendale Building	First National Bank of Glendale Building	August 25, 1983 (#83002991)	6838 N. 58th Dr. 33°32′18″N 112°11′03″W	Glendale	Building built in 1906
48	First Presbyterian Church of Peoria	First Presbyterian Church of Peoria	August 13, 2012 (#12000493)	10236 N. 83rd Ave. 33°34′41″N 112°14′17″W	Peoria	
49	Fish Creek Bridge	Fish Creek Bridge	September 30, 1988 (#88001600)	Milepost 223.50 on State Route 88; 33°32′14″N 111°17′46″W	Tortilla Flat	
50	Flagpole	Flagpole	June 19, 1995 (#95000744)	Once located at 10 St. between D and E Sts. and now located at the entrance of Phoenix-Mesa Gateway Airport (formally Williams Air Force Base). 33°18′25″N 111°40′45″W	Mesa	
51	Floralcroft Historic District	Floralcroft Historic District	April 6, 2006 (#05001505)	Roughly bounded by State St., 59th Ave., Myrtle St., Grand Ave., and 61st Ave. 33°32′35″N 112°11′16″W	Glendale	
52	Fort McDowell	Fort McDowell	August 27, 1992 (#92001050)	Indian Route 1 off State Route 87 on the Yavapai Indian Reservation; 33°38′11″N 111°40′30″W	Fort McDowell	
53	Fortaleza		June 23, 1969 (#69000035)	Address Restricted	Gila Bend	
54	Frankenberg House	Frankenberg House	January 29, 1981 (#81000138)	129 E. University Dr. 33°24′12″N 111°53′35″W	Tempe	Dismantled and rebuilt at 150 S. Ash Ave in 1992.
55	Frankenberg House	Frankenberg House	January 2, 2008 (#07001333)	2222 S. Price Rd. 33°24′11″N 111°53′31″W	Tempe	
56	Fraser Fields Historic District		August 5, 2010 (#10000535)	Fraser Dr., W., to Fraser Dr., E., and Third Pl. to Pepper Pl. 33°25′08″N 111°48′43″W	Mesa	
57	Garcia School	Garcia School	April 1, 1982 (#82002087)	Yavapai St. and U.S. Route 89; 33°58′21″N 112°43′55″W	Wickenburg	
58	Gatlin Site	Gatlin Site	October 15, 1966 (#66000183)	Address Restricted	Gila Bend	
59	Gila Bend Overpass	Gila Bend Overpass	September 30, 1988 (#88001607)	Business Route 8 over the Southern Pacific railroad line 32°56′58″N 112°41′46″W	Gila Bend	
60	Gilbert Elementary School	Gilbert Elementary School	June 16, 1980 (#80000762)	Elliot and Gilbert Rds. 33°20′57″N 111°47′22″W	Gilbert	
61	Gillespie Dam Highway Bridge	Gillespie Dam Highway Bridge	May 5, 1981 (#81000136)	Northwest of Gila Bend; 33°13′38″N 112°46′07″W	Gila Bend	
62	Glaus House		July 9, 2021 (#100006706)	6330 East McDonald Dr. 33°31′26″N 111°56′36″W	Paradise Valley	
63	Glendale Gardens Historic District	Glendale Gardens Historic District	February 3, 2012 (#11001073)	5002-5038 W. Gardenia Ave., 5007-5038 W. State Ave., & 7251-7321 N. 50th Dr. 33°32′41″N 112°10′03″W	Glendale	
64	Glendale Grammar School One-room Class Building	Glendale Grammar School One-room Class Building	January 11, 2006 (#05001503)	7301 N. 58th Dr. 33°32′40″N 112°10′55″W	Glendale	Structure built in 1920
65	Glendale High School Auditorium	Glendale High School Auditorium	May 2, 2006 (#06000326)	6216 W. Myrtle Ave. 33°32′20″N 112°11′37″W	Glendale	Auditorium built in 1939
66	Glendale Townsite-Catlin Court Historic District	Glendale Townsite-Catlin Court Historic District	June 9, 1992 (#92000680)	Roughly bounded by Gardenia, 58th, Myrtle, 57th, Palmaire, and 59th Aves. and 58th Dr.; also generally bounded by 55th Ave., 59th Ave., Palmaire Ave., and Orangewood Ave. 33°32′37″N 112°11′05″W	Glendale	One of Glendale Arizona's earliest and most historic neighborhoods Second set of boundaries represents a boundary increase of October 20, 2007
67	Glendale Tract Historic District	Glendale Tract Historic District	January 11, 2006 (#05001506)	51st Ave. and Northern Ave. 33°33′07″N 112°10′01″W	Glendale	
68	Glendale Woman's Club Clubhouse	Glendale Woman's Club Clubhouse	July 27, 1989 (#89001003)	7032 N. 56th Ave. 33°32′23″N 112°10′50″W	Glendale	Structure built in 1912
69	Gonzales-Martinez House	Gonzales-Martinez House	May 7, 1984 (#84000708)	320 W. 1st St. 33°25′46″N 111°56′34″W	Tempe	
70	Goodwin Building	Goodwin Building	May 7, 1984 (#84000710)	512-518 S. Mill Ave. 33°25′29″N 111°56′22″W	Tempe	
71	Grady Gammage Memorial Auditorium	Grady Gammage Memorial Auditorium	September 11, 1985 (#85002170)	Northeastern corner of the intersection of Mill and Apache; 33°24′59″N 111°56′14″W	Tempe	
72	Guadalupe Cemetery	Guadalupe Cemetery	November 13, 2022 (#100008342)	4649 South Beck Ave. 33°22′55″N 111°57′23″W	Tempe	
73	Roy Hackett House	Roy Hackett House	December 4, 1974 (#74000458)	401 and 405 Maple St. 33°25′34″N 111°56′25″W	Tempe	
74	Harrington-Birchett House	Harrington-Birchett House	May 7, 1984 (#84000716)	202 E. 7th St. 33°25′24″N 111°56′07″W	Tempe	
75	Hassayampa River Bridge	Hassayampa River Bridge	September 30, 1988 (#88001658)	Old U.S. Route 80 over the Hassayampa River; 33°20′54″N 112°43′17″W	Buckeye	This was a concrete slab-and-girder bridge built in 1929. The bridge was scheduled for demolition in 1993 and recent photos suggest it was destroyed and replaced, though it is conceivable that some portion of the 1929 bridge was retained.
76	Hayden Flour Mill		September 26, 2024 (#100010872)	119 S. Mill Avenue; 33°25′43″N 111°56′23″W	Tempe	
77	C.T. Hayden House	C.T. Hayden House	October 10, 1984 (#84000173)	3 W. 1st St. 33°25′45″N 111°56′21″W	Tempe	Home of Charles T. Hayden;
78	Hiatt House	Hiatt House	May 7, 1984 (#84000720)	1104 Ash Ave. 33°25′08″N 111°56′34″W	Tempe	
79	Horse Mesa Dam	Horse Mesa Dam	August 7, 2017 (#100001408)	On the Salt River approximately 65 miles east-northeast of Phoenix; 33°35′27″N 111°20′38″W	Phoenix	
80	Horseshoe Dam	Horseshoe Dam	August 7, 2017 (#100001409)	On the Verde River approximately 58 miles east-northeast of Phoenix; 33°59′01″N 111°42′40″W	Phoenix	
81	House at 160 Apache	House at 160 Apache	July 10, 1986 (#86001578)	160 Apache; 33°58′03″N 112°43′55″W	Wickenburg	
82	House at 170 Center	House at 170 Center	July 10, 1986 (#86001579)	170 Center; 33°58′00″N 112°43′54″W	Wickenburg	
83	House at 186 Washington	House at 186 Washington	July 10, 1986 (#86001580)	186 Washington; 33°57′59″N 112°43′43″W	Wickenburg	
84	Housing Storage Supply Warehouse	Housing Storage Supply Warehouse	June 19, 1995 (#95000746)	Northwestern corner of the junction of Innovation and Unity Aves. (once known as Jct. of 11th and A Sts.), at the Arizona State University Polytechnic campus (formerly Williams Air Force Base). 33°18′14″N 111°40′49″W	Mesa	
85	Industrial Arts Building	Industrial Arts Building	September 4, 1985 (#85002168)	Arizona State University campus (building 4); 33°25′14″N 111°56′04″W	Tempe	
86	Initial Point of the Gila and Salt River Base Line and Meridian	Initial Point of the Gila and Salt River Base Line and Meridian	October 15, 2002 (#02001137)	Summit of Monument Hill at 115th Ave. and Baseline Rd. 33°22′38″N 112°18′22″W	Avondale	The surveying marker of the Gila and Salt River Meridan. See also: Gila and Salt River Meridian and Baseline Road (Arizona)
87	Irving School	Irving School	November 8, 2000 (#00001323)	155 N. Center St. 33°25′08″N 111°49′49″W	Mesa	
88	Jacobs House	Jacobs House	July 10, 1986 (#86001581)	355 N. Jefferson; 33°58′10″N 112°44′02″W	Wickenburg	
89	Edward L. Jones House	Edward L. Jones House	December 13, 1996 (#96001474)	5555 N. Casa Blanca Dr. 33°31′03″N 111°56′17″W	Paradise Valley	House was built in 1925
90	Louise Lincoln Kerr House and Studio	Louise Lincoln Kerr House and Studio	April 14, 2010 (#10000173)	6110 N. Scottsdale Rd. 33°31′34″N 111°55′40″W	Scottsdale	
91	Kiva Craft Center	Kiva Craft Center	July 6, 2022 (#100007876)	7121-7141 East 5th Ave. 33°29′54″N 111°55′38″W	Scottsdale	
92	Laird-Hugh House	Laird-Hugh House	May 7, 1984 (#84000726)	821 S. Farmer; 33°25′15″N 111°56′35″W	Tempe	
93	Laveen School Auditorium	Laveen School Auditorium	February 16, 1996 (#96000040)	5001 W. Dobbins Rd. 33°21′45″N 112°10′03″W	Laveen	
94	Lehi School	Lehi School	August 30, 2001 (#01000906)	2345 N. Horne; 33°27′30″N 111°48′46″W	Mesa	Currently home to the Mesa Historical Museum, and is at the center of the historic Lehi community.
95	Lewis and Pranty Creek Bridge		September 30, 1988 (#88001601)	Milepost 224.60 on State Route 88; 33°31′30″N 111°18′24″W	Tortilla Flat	
96	Liberty Methodist Episcopal Church, South	Liberty Methodist Episcopal Church, South	December 28, 2017 (#100001752)	19912 W. County Route 85; 33°22′39″N 112°29′14″W	Buckeye	
97	Samuel C. Long House	Samuel C. Long House	November 28, 1980 (#80000765)	27 E. 6th St. 33°25′27″N 111°56′17″W	Tempe	Dismantled and rebuilt at 150 S. Ash Ave in 1992.
98	MacLennan House	MacLennan House	July 10, 1986 (#86001582)	338 Jefferson; 33°09′32″N 112°43′07″W	Wickenburg	
99	Main Building, Tempe Normal School	Main Building, Tempe Normal School	January 7, 1985 (#85000052)	Arizona State University campus 33°25′14″N 111°55′59″W	Tempe	Now called "Old Main"
100	Manistee Ranch	Manistee Ranch	April 9, 1998 (#98000322)	5127 W. Northern Ave. 33°33′07″N 112°10′12″W	Glendale	
101	Masonic Hall		July 10, 1986 (#86001583)	108 Tegner; 33°58′09″N 112°43′46″W	Wickenburg	The building was demolished in June 2011.
102	Matthews Hall	Matthews Hall	January 11, 1985 (#85000053)	Arizona State University campus (Building 172); 33°25′12″N 111°56′07″W	Tempe	
103	McCullough-Price House	McCullough-Price House	May 20, 2009 (#09000311)	300 S. Chandler Village Dr. 33°17′52″N 111°54′09″W	Chandler	Historic 1938 adobe house restored in the mid-2000s across from Chandler Fashion Center shopping mall
104	Jonas McNair House	Jonas McNair House	September 6, 2006 (#06000768)	5919 W. Myrtle Ave. 33°32′31″N 112°11′11″W	Glendale	House built in 1897
105	Mesa Grande	Mesa Grande	November 21, 1978 (#78000549)	Junction of Date and 10th Sts. 33°26′05″N 111°50′41″W	Mesa	
106	Mesa Journal-Tribune FHA Demonstration Home	Mesa Journal-Tribune FHA Demonstration Home	January 23, 2003 (#88003056)	238 W. 2nd St. 33°25′11″N 111°50′14″W	Mesa	Relocated in 2002 from original location at 22 East First Avenue.
107	Mesa Woman's Club	Mesa Woman's Club	August 5, 1991 (#91000995)	200 N. Macdonald; 33°25′11″N 111°50′02″W	Mesa	Now the Guild of the Vale
108	Midvale Archeological Site		June 14, 1990 (#90000933)	Address Restricted	Chandler	
109	Gov. Benjamin B. Moeur House	Gov. Benjamin B. Moeur House	May 30, 2012 (#12000295)	34 E. 7th St. 33°25′25″N 111°56′18″W	Tempe	
110	Moeur Park	Moeur Park	November 5, 2014 (#14000888)	715 N. Mill Ave. 33°26′16″N 111°56′32″W	Tempe	
111	W. A. Moeur House	W. A. Moeur House	May 7, 1984 (#84000730)	850 Ash Ave. 33°25′14″N 111°56′30″W	Tempe	
112	Mormon Flat Bridge	Mormon Flat Bridge	September 30, 1988 (#88001598)	State Route 88 over Willow Creek; 33°32′20″N 111°26′34″W	Tortilla Flat	
113	Mormon Flat Dam	Mormon Flat Dam	August 7, 2017 (#100001410)	On the Salt River approximately 50 miles east-northeast of Phoenix; 33°33′19″N 111°26′35″W	Phoenix	
114	Morristown Store	Morristown Store	August 12, 1991 (#91001003)	U.S. Route 89 (now U.S. Route 60) northwest of Castle Hot Springs Rd. 33°51′19″N 112°37′19″W	Morristown	
115	Morrow-Hudson House	Morrow-Hudson House	May 7, 1984 (#84000733)	1203 E. Alameda Dr. 33°23′59″N 111°55′01″W	Tempe	
116	C.P. Mullen House	C.P. Mullen House	May 7, 1984 (#84000734)	918 Mill Ave. 33°25′11″N 111°56′22″W	Tempe	
117	Municipal Light Plant		July 10, 1986 (#86001584)	245 N. Washington; 33°58′12″N 112°43′58″W	Wickenburg	
118	Myrtle Avenue Residential Historic District	Myrtle Avenue Residential Historic District	January 22, 2009 (#08001345)	6305-6423 W. Myrtle Ave. 33°32′31″N 112°11′50″W	Glendale	
119	Northfield Historic District	Northfield Historic District	May 10, 2010 (#10000234)	Bounded by W. State Ave (S), N. 59th Ave (E), W. Orangewood Ave (N), and N. 59th Lane (W); 33°32′42″N 112°11′14″W	Glendale	
120	Sandra Day O'Connor House	Sandra Day O'Connor House	July 18, 2019 (#100004185)	1230 N. College Ave. 33°26′37″N 111°55′57″W	Tempe	
121	Old Barber Shop	Old Barber Shop	July 10, 1986 (#86001585)	68 Frontier; 33°58′07″N 112°43′48″W	Wickenburg	
122	Old Brick Post Office	Old Brick Post Office	July 10, 1986 (#86001586)	144 N. Frontier; 33°58′09″N 112°43′50″W	Wickenburg	
123	Our Lady of Perpetual Help Mission Church	Our Lady of Perpetual Help Mission Church	September 24, 2018 (#100002979)	3817 N Brown Ave. 33°29′32″N 111°55′29″W	Scottsdale	
124	Painted Rocks	Painted Rocks	November 25, 1977 (#77000238)	Along Rocky Point Rd. west of Theba; 33°01′24″N 113°02′55″W	Theba	
125	Palo Verde Ruin	Palo Verde Ruin	November 22, 2011 (#11000842)	Palo Verde Open Space Park; 33°43′12″N 112°13′06″W	Peoria	Area in the Palo Verde Park section of the Palo Verde Ruin.
126	Park of the Canals	Park of the Canals	May 30, 1975 (#75000350)	1710 N Horne Ave. 33°26′42″N 111°48′56″W	Mesa	This is an ancient Hohokam canal cleaned out by the Mormon pioneers in 1875.
127	Peoria High School Old Main	Peoria High School Old Main	November 20, 2018 (#100000551)	11200 N. 83rd Ave. 33°35′12″N 112°14′16″W	Peoria	
128	Peoria Jail House	Peoria Jail House	February 20, 2020 (#100004993)	8322 West Washington St. 33°34′51″N 112°14′20″W	Peoria	
129	Niels Petersen House	Niels Petersen House	January 5, 1978 (#78000553)	Southern Ave. and Priest St. 33°23′36″N 111°57′40″W	Tempe	
130	Petroglyph Site AZ U 1:165		August 31, 1998 (#98001038)	Address Restricted; 33°46′42″N 111°55′04″W	Scottsdale	
131	Pine Creek Bridge		September 30, 1988 (#88001602)	Milepost 233.50 on State Route 88; 33°35′54″N 111°12′08″W	Tortilla Flat	
132	Ponderosa II	Ponderosa II	June 25, 2018 (#100002146)	602 S. Edgewater Dr. 33°24′12″N 111°40′58″W	Mesa	
133	President's House	President's House	January 7, 1985 (#85000054)	Arizona State University campus 33°25′13″N 111°55′56″W	Tempe	
134	Railroad Steam Wrecking Crane and Tool Car	Railroad Steam Wrecking Crane and Tool Car	December 29, 2007 (#07001301)	330 E. Ryan Rd. 33°16′12″N 111°50′07″W	Chandler	
135	Byron Redden House	Byron Redden House	May 7, 1984 (#84000738)	948 Ash Ave. 33°25′08″N 111°56′31″W	Tempe	
136	Lowell Redden House	Lowell Redden House	February 13, 1985 (#85000407)	333 Carver St. 33°20′28″N 111°55′57″W	Tempe	
137	Rittenhouse Elementary School	Rittenhouse Elementary School	February 5, 1998 (#98000053)	20425 S Ellsworth Rd at E Queen Creek Road; 33°15′47″N 111°38′01″W	Queen Creek	1925 Spanish Colonial Revival schoolhouse, currently the San Tan Historical Society Museum
138	Roald Amundsen Pullman Private Railroad Car	Roald Amundsen Pullman Private Railroad Car	August 6, 2009 (#09000582)	7301 Indian Bend Rd. 33°32′17″N 111°55′28″W	Scottsdale	Built in 1928, the Amundsen, on different occasions reportedly carried Presidents Hoover, Roosevelt, Truman and Eisenhower.
139	Robson Historic District	Robson Historic District	June 20, 2003 (#03000530)	Roughly bounded by Country Club Dr., Robson, and 2nd Sts. 33°25′16″N 111°50′14″W	Mesa	
140	Roosevelt Addition Historic District	Roosevelt Addition Historic District	December 2, 2009 (#09000959)	600 block of W. 3rd St. 33°25′38″N 111°56′54″W	Tempe	
141	Theodore Roosevelt Dam National Register District	Theodore Roosevelt Dam National Register District	March 16, 1998 (#98000144)	Linear area along the shore of Lake Roosevelt from the dam to the canal intake 33°39′19″N 111°04′54″W	Roosevelt	District includes resources that were involved in the construction of the dam, but the dam itself is not a contributing property
142	Safeway Pay 'n Takit	Safeway Pay 'n Takit	July 10, 1986 (#86001587)	42 N. Tegner; 33°58′09″N 112°43′44″W	Wickenburg	
143	Sage Acres Historic District		February 3, 2012 (#11001074)	6021-6251 N. 48th Ave. and 4736 W. Bethany Home Rd. 33°31′33″N 112°09′43″W	Glendale	
144	Sahuaro Ranch	Sahuaro Ranch	March 7, 1980 (#80000763)	N. 59th Ave. 33°34′34″N 112°11′18″W	Glendale	
145	St. Mary's Church-Our Lady of Mount Carmel Catholic Church	St. Mary's Church-Our Lady of Mount Carmel Catholic Church	January 30, 1978 (#78000552)	College and University Ave. 33°25′20″N 111°56′04″W	Tempe	
146	Salt River Project Diversion and Conveyance System Historic District		August 7, 2017 (#100001454)	Greater Phoenix metropolitan area 33°34′42″N 111°23′21″W	Phoenix	
147	San Marcos Hotel	San Marcos Hotel	April 29, 1982 (#82002078)	1 San Marcos Pl. 33°18′14″N 111°50′27″W	Chandler	
148	Sands Estate Historic District		April 15, 2011 (#11000192)	Roughly bounded by W. Belmont Ave., W. Morten Ave., Orangewood Ave., and W. Vista Ave. 33°32′51″N 112°10′56″W	Glendale	
149	Sands North Townhouses Historic District		September 20, 2022 (#100008212)	7230-7310 East Joshua Tree Ln., 6802-6650 North 72nd Pl., 7231-7309 East Cactus Wren Rd., and 6811-6839 North 73rd St. 33°32′09″N 111°55′28″W	Scottsdale	
150	Santa Fe Railroad Depot	Santa Fe Railroad Depot	July 10, 1986 (#86001588)	215 N. Frontier; 33°58′10″N 112°43′54″W	Wickenburg	
151	Robert Scott House	Robert Scott House	July 8, 1982 (#82002079)	2230 E. Grandview St. 33°26′25″N 111°46′52″W	Mesa	
152	Scottsdale Grammar School	Scottsdale Grammar School	June 10, 1994 (#94000571)	7333 E. Scottsdale Mall; 33°29′33″N 111°55′22″W	Scottsdale	Built in 1909, it is also known as "The Little Red Schoolhouse"
153	Scottsdale North	Scottsdale North	January 25, 2023 (#100008581)	5600-5682 North Scottsdale Rd. 33°31′11″N 111°55′35″W	Scottsdale	
154	B.H. Scudder Rental House	B.H. Scudder Rental House	May 7, 1984 (#84000740)	919 S. Maple Ave. 33°25′10″N 111°56′23″W	Tempe	Demolished in 1983;
155	Sears-Kay Ruin	Sears-Kay Ruin	November 24, 1995 (#95001310)	Tonto National Forest on the outskirts of the town of Carefree, Az. 33°50′40″N 111°17′04″W	Carefree	
156	Selleh House	Selleh House	November 5, 2005 (#05001197)	1104 S. Mill Ave. 33°25′02″N 111°56′22″W	Tempe	
157	Shride House	Shride House	July 21, 1986 (#86001589)	57 Tegner; 33°58′06″N 112°43′43″W	Wickenburg	
158	Silk Stocking Neighborhood Historic District	Silk Stocking Neighborhood Historic District	August 29, 2011 (#11000567)	Generally bounded by Erie St., Chandler Boulevard, Delaware St., and an alley west of Washington St. 33°18′28″N 111°50′23″W	Chandler	
159	Sirrine House	Sirrine House	September 11, 1995 (#95001082)	160 N. Center St. 33°25′10″N 111°49′54″W	Mesa	
160	Skeleton Cave Massacre Site	Skeleton Cave Massacre Site	February 21, 1991 (#91000100)	Address Restricted	Apache Junction vicinity	See also: Yavapai people: Skeleton Cave
161	Southern Pacific Railroad Locomotive No. SP 2562 and Tender No. 8365	Southern Pacific Railroad Locomotive No. SP 2562 and Tender No. 8365	July 17, 2009 (#09000511)	330 E. Ryan Rd. 33°16′11″N 111°50′10″W	Chandler	
162	Spangler-Wilbur House	Spangler-Wilbur House	November 1, 1993 (#93001141)	128 N. MacDonald St. 33°25′04″N 111°50′01″W	Mesa	
163	Stewart Mountain Dam	Stewart Mountain Dam	August 7, 2017 (#100001411)	On the Salt River approximately 40 miles east-northeast of Phoenix; 33°34′00″N 111°32′09″W	Phoenix	
164	Stoneman Road Military Trail Segment		January 2, 2025 (#100011210)	Parcel bounded by Cave Creek Road, Mule Train Road, Stagecoach Pass, and Windmill Road; 33°48′53″N 111°54′19″W	Carefree	
165	Storms House	Storms House	July 10, 1986 (#86001590)	130 Center; 33°58′01″N 112°43′51″W	Wickenburg	
166	Stout's Hotel	Stout's Hotel	September 24, 2018 (#100002980)	133 E Pima St. 32°56′51″N 112°42′57″W	Gila Bend	
167	Straugh House	Straugh House	July 31, 1991 (#91000983)	148 N. Macdonald; 33°25′06″N 111°50′02″W	Mesa	
168	Suhwaro Hotel	Suhwaro Hotel	June 10, 1994 (#94000575)	58 W. Buffalo St. 33°18′18″N 111°50′30″W	Chandler	
169	Sun City DEVCO Model No.1	Sun City DEVCO Model No.1	February 24, 2015 (#15000022)	10801 W. Oakmont Dr. 33°36′04″N 112°17′32″W	Sun City	Now the Del Webb Sun Cities Museum.
170	Sun-Up Ranch	Sun-Up Ranch	May 23, 1988 (#88000558)	W. Frontage Rd. of Black Canyon Hwy., 1.75 miles (2.82 km) north of Desert Hills interchange 33°53′49″N 112°08′59″W	New River	Current boundaries represent a boundary decrease of January 8, 2009
171	Sunflower Ranger Station	Sunflower Ranger Station	June 10, 1993 (#93000528)	State Route 87 west of Punkin Center in the Tonto National Forest; 33°53′39″N 111°28′55″W	Punkin Center	
172	Tal'-Wi-Wi Ranch		November 14, 2025 (#100011259)	9801 N. Litchfield Rd. and 9816 N. Litchfield Rd; 33°34′23″N 112°21′32″W	El Mirage vicinity	
173	Taliesin West	Taliesin West	February 12, 1974 (#74000457)	North of the junction of Shea Boulevard and 108th St. 33°36′22″N 111°50′16″W	Scottsdale	
174	Tempe Beach Stadium	Tempe Beach Stadium	January 7, 1985 (#85000055)	Ash at 1st St. 33°25′47″N 111°56′32″W	Tempe	
175	Tempe Butte	Tempe Butte	April 8, 2011 (#11000175)	Bounded on the north by Tempe Town Lake, on the west by Mill Ave. District, on the south by Arizona State University; 33°25′41″N 111°56′08″W	Tempe	
176	Tempe Concrete Arch Highway Bridge	Tempe Concrete Arch Highway Bridge	May 7, 1984 (#84000743)	Mill Ave. and Salt River; 33°26′06″N 111°56′32″W	Tempe	
177	Tempe Double Butte Cemetery, Pioneer Section	Tempe Double Butte Cemetery, Pioneer Section	July 23, 2013 (#13000020)	2505 W. Broadway Rd. 33°24′22″N 111°58′30″W	Tempe	Among the early Tempe settlers buried in the cemetery are Charles Trumbull Hayden (founder of Tempe), Carl T. Hayden (Senator), Benjamin B. Moeur (Governor) and John Howard Pyle (Governor).
178	Tempe Hardware Building	Tempe Hardware Building	June 26, 1980 (#80000767)	520 S. Mill Ave. 33°25′33″N 111°56′20″W	Tempe	
179	Tempe Woman's Club	Tempe Woman's Club	May 11, 2000 (#00000461)	1290 S. Mill Ave. 33°24′54″N 111°56′22″W	Tempe	
180	Temple Historic District	Temple Historic District	November 8, 2000 (#00001321)	Roughly between Mesa Dr., Broadway Rd., and Hobson and Main Sts. 33°24′42″N 111°49′14″W	Mesa	Encompass the neighborhoods around the Mesa Arizona Temple
181	Thunderbird Estates and The McDonald Addition Historic District	Thunderbird Estates and The McDonald Addition Historic District	June 30, 2010 (#10000235)	Bounded by West Northern Ave. (south), North 59th Ave. (west), and West Royal Palm Rd. (north), and including lots facing both sides of North 57th Ave. (east); 33°33′16″N 112°11′02″W	Glendale	
182	C.H. Tinker House	C.H. Tinker House	January 11, 2006 (#05001504)	6838 N. 59th Dr. 33°32′18″N 112°11′15″W	Glendale	House built in 1913
183	Frank Titus House	Frank Titus House	May 13, 1982 (#82002086)	1310 N. Hayden Rd. 33°27′44″N 111°54′32″W	Scottsdale	
184	Tomlinson Estates Historic District		December 15, 2015 (#15000884)	1320-1437 E. Hall and 1300-1404 E. Lemon Sts. 33°24′59″N 111°54′55″W	Tempe	
185	Town and Country Scottsdale Residential Historic District		September 8, 2009 (#09000694)	Bounded by 72nd Place on the west, 74th St. on the east, Oak St. on the north, and Monte Vista on the south 33°28′21″N 111°55′24″W	Scottsdale	
186	Tubercular Cabin	Tubercular Cabin	October 28, 2001 (#01001172)	6140 Skyline Dr. 33°49′45″N 111°56′51″W	Cave Creek	
187	Tucson, Cornelia and Gila Bend Railroad Caboose No. 15	Tucson, Cornelia and Gila Bend Railroad Caboose No. 15	May 7, 2018 (#100001660)	330 E. Ryan Rd. 33°16′10″N 111°50′11″W	Chandler	
188	University Park Historic District	University Park Historic District	February 20, 2008 (#07001174)	Bounded by 13th St., Forest Ave, alley between Apache Boulevard and 14th St., McAllister Ave., Union Pacific railroad line, and Mill Ave. 33°24′47″N 111°56′06″W	Tempe	
189	George B. Upton House	George B. Upton House	July 10, 1986 (#86001592)	171 Washington; 33°58′08″N 112°43′52″W	Wickenburg	
190	Valley Field Riding and Polo Club	Valley Field Riding and Polo Club	February 5, 2009 (#08001405)	2530 N. 64th St. 33°28′30″N 111°56′44″W	Scottsdale	The Valley Field Riding and Polo Club is located within the premises of a private gated community and is in a total state of abandonment.
191	Vernetta Hotel	Vernetta Hotel	July 10, 1986 (#86001593)	1 Apache St. 33°58′07″N 112°43′48″W	Wickenburg	
192	Vienna Bakery	Vienna Bakery	June 30, 1980 (#80000764)	415 S. Mill Ave. 33°25′34″N 111°56′17″W	Tempe	
193	Village Grove 1-6 Historic District		May 10, 2010 (#10000236)	Bounded by the canal at 66th St. to the west, 69th to the east, Oak St. to the north, and Almeria Rd. to the south 33°28′12″N 111°56′09″W	Scottsdale	
194	Harry Walker House	Harry Walker House	May 7, 1984 (#84000745)	118 E. 7th St. 33°25′24″N 111°56′11″W	Tempe	
195	Water Pump Station and Water Tower	Water Pump Station and Water Tower	June 19, 1995 (#95000745)	Northeastern corner of the junction of Innovation and Unity Aves. at the Arizona State University Polytechnic campus 33°18′17″N 111°40′51″W	Mesa	
196	West Second Street Historic District	West Second Street Historic District	July 2, 1999 (#99000707)	Roughly between Robson St. and Center St., from 1st St. to 3rd St.; also roughly bounded by Robson St., University Dr. and MacDonald St. 33°25′10″N 111°50′00″W	Mesa	Second set of boundaries represents a boundary increase of June 20, 2003
197	West Side-Clark Addition Historic District	West Side-Clark Addition Historic District	August 5, 2010 (#10000534)	Date St. to Country Club Dr.; 2nd Pl. to Pepper St. 33°25′10″N 111°50′32″W	Mesa	
198	E.M. White Dairy Barn	E.M. White Dairy Barn	October 10, 1984 (#84000176)	1810 E. Apache; 33°24′54″N 111°54′27″W	Tempe	
199	Wickenburg-Boetto House	Wickenburg-Boetto House	October 4, 2006 (#06000912)	225 S. Washington St. 33°57′59″N 112°43′43″W	Wickenburg	
200	Wickenburg High School and Annex	Wickenburg High School and Annex	July 10, 1986 (#86001595)	250 S. Tegner; 33°58′03″N 112°43′36″W	Wickenburg	1925 Colonial Revival original school and 1935 annex
201	Wickenburg High School Gymnasium	Wickenburg High School Gymnasium	July 10, 1986 (#86001594)	252 S. Tegner; 33°58′03″N 112°43′36″W	Wickenburg	WPA cast concrete structure from 1934
202	Wickenburg Ice and Cold Storage		July 10, 1986 (#86001596)	48 S. Coconino; 33°58′05″N 112°43′43″W	Wickenburg	Demolished
203	Henry Wickenburg Pioneer Cemetery	Henry Wickenburg Pioneer Cemetery	April 4, 2011 (#11000151)	Adams St. 33°57′52″N 112°43′46″W	Wickenburg	
204	Wilbur Street Historic District	Wilbur Street Historic District	June 24, 1999 (#99000708)	Roughly between Pasadena St. and Pomeroy St., 1st St. to 3rd St. 33°25′06″N 111°49′30″W	Mesa	
205	Wisdom House	Wisdom House	August 6, 1987 (#87001590)	48 Kerkes; 33°58′09″N 112°43′32″W	Wickenburg	

== Former listings ==
	Name on the Register	Image	Date listed	Date removed	Location	City or town	Description
1	Archeological Site No. AZ U:10:60(ASM)		7 March 1995 (#95000752)	July 16, 2008	Address Restricted	Mesa	In-Between Site
2	Archeological Site No. AZ U:10:61(ASM)		7 March 1995 (#95000753)	February 3, 2011	Address Restricted	Mesa	Ordnance Site
3	Archeological Site No. AZ U:10:65(ASM)		7 March 1995 (#95000754)	July 17, 2009	Address Restricted	Mesa	Radar Site
4	Archeological Site No. AZ U:10:66(ASM)		7 March 1995 (#95000755)	July 17, 2009	Address Restricted	Mesa	El Horno Grande Site
5	Archeological Site No. AZ U:10:68(ASM)		7 March 1995 (#95000756)	July 3, 2002	Address Restricted	Mesa	Outer Limits Site
6	Archeological Site No. AZ U:10:77(ASM)		July 3, 1995 (#95000749)	October 19, 2000	Address Restricted	Mesa	
7	Bankhead Highway		January 7, 1985 (#85000051)	July 18, 1989	Rural Rd. to Hayden Rd.	Tempe	
8	J. D. Cooper Saloon		1984 (#84003887)	1988	202 W. 5th St. 33°25′32″N 111°56′32″W	Tempe	Demolished
9	Ellingson Warehouse		August 28, 1985 (#85002082)	July 18, 1989	24 W. 7th St. 33°25′40″N 111°49′56″W	Tempe	Destroyed by fire, October 29, 1987.
10	Mary and Moses Green House		February 3, 1985 (#85000406)	May 2, 2006	W of Carver Street	Tempe	
11	Joseph E. Johnson House		October 10, 1984 (#84000174)	July 18, 1989	720 Mill Ave. 33°25′23″N 111°56′24″W	Tempe	
12	Rev. Daniel Kloss House		May 7, 1984 (#84000723)	April 8, 1988	202 E. 6th St. 33°25′28″N 111°56′12″W	Tempe	Demolished in 1984
13	Miller Block		May 7, 1984 (#84000727)	May 2, 2006	418-422 Mill Avenue	Tempe	Demolished in 1996
14	Jesus Miranda Homestead		May 7, 1984 (#84000729)	May 2, 2006	1992 East University; 33°25′22″N 111°54′05″W	Tempe	Demolished in February, 2001
15	Ollerton House		May 7, 1984 (#84000735)	April 8, 1988	1004 S. Mill Ave. 33°25′08″N 111°56′25″W	Tempe	
16	Samuel Openshaw House		May 7, 1984 (#84000737)	April 8, 1988	104 W. 6th St. 33°25′28″N 111°56′31″W	Tempe	
17	Petersen Building		March 18, 1980 (#80000766)	May 2, 2006	409-413 S. Mill Avenue; 33°25′34″N 111°56′23″W	Tempe	Also known as the Chipman-Petersen Building. Significantly damaged by fire December 27, 1990.
18	Poil House		1985 (#85003554)	1988	4070 S. Priest Dr. 33°23′14″N 111°57′39″W	Tempe	
19	Rohrig School		October 10, 1984 (#84000175)	May 2, 2006	2328 E. University Drive; 33°25′19″N 111°53′19″W	Tempe	Demolished in 1996
20	Sampson House		May 7, 1984 (#84000739)	August 30, 1989	109 W. 6th St. 33°25′28″N 111°56′31″W	Tempe	Also known as the Samson-Tupper House. Delisted due to modification and relocation to 601 W 3rd in 1989.
21	Steward House		May 7, 1984 (#84000742)	July 18, 1989	612 Maple Ave. 33°23′00″N 111°56′26″W	Tempe	
22	Tempe Cotton Exchange Cotton Gin Seed Storage Building		May 7, 1984 (#84000744)	May 2, 2006	215 W. 7th Street; 33°25′23″N 111°56′39″W	Tempe	
23	Tempe Bridge		September 30, 1988 (#88001606)	October 2, 1992	Abandoned road over Salt River	Tempe	Demolished in January 1991. Listed on the NRHP under two separate listings.
24	P.J. Thompson House		September 30, 1988 (#86001591)	October 2, 1992	141 N. Washington; 33°58′09″N 112°43′58″W	Wickenburg	Destroyed by fire
25	Wetmore Ranch		1985 (#85003547)	1988	2420 W Baseline Rd. 33°22′43″N 111°58′30″W	Tempe	Demolished

== See also ==
- National Register of Historic Places listings in Phoenix, Arizona
- List of National Historic Landmarks in Arizona
- National Register of Historic Places listings in Arizona
