= Gatlin Site =

Archaeological site in Arizona, United States

- U.S. National Register of Historic Places
- U.S. National Historic Landmark
- Gatlin Site excavation, 1958–1962. Photo courtesy Arizona State Museum.

- Location within Arizona Location within the United States
- Nearest city: Gila Bend, Arizona
- Built: 900 AD
- NRHP reference No.: 66000183

Significant dates
- Added to NRHP: October 15, 1966
- Designated NHL: July 19, 1964

The Gatlin Site is an archaeological site in Gila Bend, Arizona. The site preserves one of the few documented Hohokam platform mounds. Associated with the mound are pit houses, ball courts, middens, and prehistoric canals. Between AD 800 and 1200 it was an important Hohokam settlement at the great bend of the Gila River. The Hohokam people were early farmers in southern Arizona, where the permanent Salt and Gila Rivers flowing through the hot Sonoran Desert made the irrigation strategy possible. The site is the largest in the area and was home to over 500 people. Its importance is indicated by the presence of two ceremonial ball courts and one of the earliest platform mounds known. The mound is notable as being one of only few excavated and documented Sedentary Period platform mounds still relatively intact. The site was declared a National Historic Landmark in 1964.

The site was discovered during surveys in advance of construction of the Painted Rock Dam by the United States Army Corps of Engineers, and underwent its first excavations in 1959–60. It is located on a plateau above the Gila River, on land belonging at the time to rancher Colin Gatlin. This area had long been an area of archaeological interest to Norton Allen, who identified the mound containing one of the platform mounds to be of particular interest in 1937, without realizing what it actually contained.

The Gatlin Site now belongs to the town of Gila Bend, which is developing it as a regional cultural park.

== See also ==
- List of National Historic Landmarks in Arizona
- National Register of Historic Places listings in Maricopa County, Arizona
