= Four Peaks Brewery =

Arizona based AB InBev brewery and restaurant chain

Coordinates: 33°25′9.9768″N 111°54′57.3588″W

Four Peaks Brewing Company
- Location: Tempe, Arizona; US
- Opened: 1996
- Annual production volume: 98,000 US beer barrels (115,000 hL) (2022)
- Owned by: Anheuser-Busch InBev
- Website: http://www.fourpeaks.com

Active beers
Name	Type
Kilt Lifter	Scottish-Style Ale
8th Street Ale	English Pale Ale
WOW Wheat	American Wheat Ale
Hop Knot	West Coast India Pale Ale
Raj	English India Pale Ale
Oatmeal Stout	English Stout
Peach Ale	Golden Ale
Sunbru (SunsBru)	Kölsch-Style Ale
Golden Lager	Munich Helles
Double Knot	Double West Coast India Pale Ale

Seasonal beers
Name	Type
Pumpkin Porter	Porter
Double Pumpkin Porter	Porter
Sirius Black	Barrel-Aged Russian Imperial Stout
Barrel-Aged Kilt Lifter	Barrel-Aged Scottish-Style Ale
Barrel-Aged Raj	Barrel-Aged English India Pale Ale
Tea Shot	Green Tea Lager
Recreational Juice	Dank India Pale Ale
Xerocole	West Coast India Pale Ale
Rattle On Red Ale	Red Ale
Red Bird Lager	Red Lager
Iron Horse	Hoppy Golden Ale

Four Peaks Brewing Co. is an Arizona brewery that was founded by Andy Ingram, Jim Scussel, and Randy Schultz in 1995 and opened to the public on December 11, 1996. The company is headquartered in the historic former Borden Co. Creamery and Ice Factory on 8th Street in Tempe, Arizona, about one-half mile (800 m) east of the campus of Arizona State University.

On December 18, 2015, AB InBev announced an agreement to acquire Four Peaks Brewing Co.

== Beers ==
Four Peaks Brewing Co.'s flagship beer is Kilt Lifter, a Scottish-style ale with a 6.0% ABV. Other notable beers are Hop Knot West Coast IPA, Desert Daydream New England–style IPA and WOW Wheat. Four Peaks also brews Pumpkin Porter, the most popular seasonal beer in the state of Arizona.

== 8th Street Pub ==
The 8th Street Pub is Four Peaks Brewing Co.'s primary location. Located at 1340 E. 8th Street in Tempe, it is housed inside the historic former Borden Milk Co. Creamery and Ice Factory originally constructed in 1892. The building was added to the National Register of Historic Places in 1984. It is rumored the former creamery building is haunted. The brewery was featured on season 28, episode 13 of Ghost Adventures. The episode was titled "Terror in Tempe."

Four Peaks occupies nearly the entire building, though one portion on the far west side of the building is controlled by Infusion Tea & Coffee.

In 2016, Four Peaks expanded into a former creamery office built on-site in 1915. The office also served as the former location of Uranus Recording Studio, which was owned and operated by Gin Blossoms lead singer Robin Wilson (musician) from 1994 to 2015.

== Other locations ==
The company opened a second restaurant location in Scottsdale, Arizona, in 2004. That location closed permanently in 2020.

An additional brewing-only site was opened in 2012 on Wilson Street in Tempe as production needs increased. The production facility also houses a small private event space.

In 2013, a Four Peaks Brewing Co. location opened inside Terminal 4 at Phoenix Sky Harbor International Airport.

== Awards ==
2018 World Beer Cup

- Bronze Medal (Other International-Style Lager) – Golden Lager

2016 World Beer Cup

- Gold Medal (Scottish-Style Ale) – Kilt Lifter Scottish-Style Ale

2014 World Beer Cup

- Bronze Medal (Scottish-Style Ale) – Kilt Lifter Scottish-Style Ale

2013 Great American Beer Festival

- Silver Medal (American-Style Strong Pale Ale) – Hop Knot West Coast IPA
- Silver Medal (Scottish-Style Ale) – Kilt Lifter Scottish-Style Ale

2012 World Beer Cup

- Gold Medal (American-Style Strong Pale Ale) – Hop Knot West Coast IPA
- Gold Medal (German-Style Kolsch/Koln-Style Kolsch) – Sunbru
- Bronze Medal (Ordinary or Special Bitter) – 8th Street Ale

2008 World Beer Cup

- Silver Medal (Aged Beer [Ale or Lager]) – Hopsquatch '06
- Silver Medal (Barley wine–Style Ale) – Hopsquatch '07
- Silver Medal (Smoke-Flavor Beer) – Smoked Imperial Porter

2006 World Beer Cup

- Gold Medal (Barley wine–Style Ale) – Hopsquatch
- Bronze Medal (American-Style Strong Pale Ale) – Hop Knot West Coast IPA

2004 World Beer Cup

- Bronze Medal (Imperial or Double Red Ale) – Hopsquatch

2002 World Beer Cup

- Bronze Medal (Ordinary Bitter) – Street Ale
