= Buckhorn Hot Mineral Wells =

Thermal springs in Arizona

- Buckhorn Baths; Buckhorn Mineral Wells
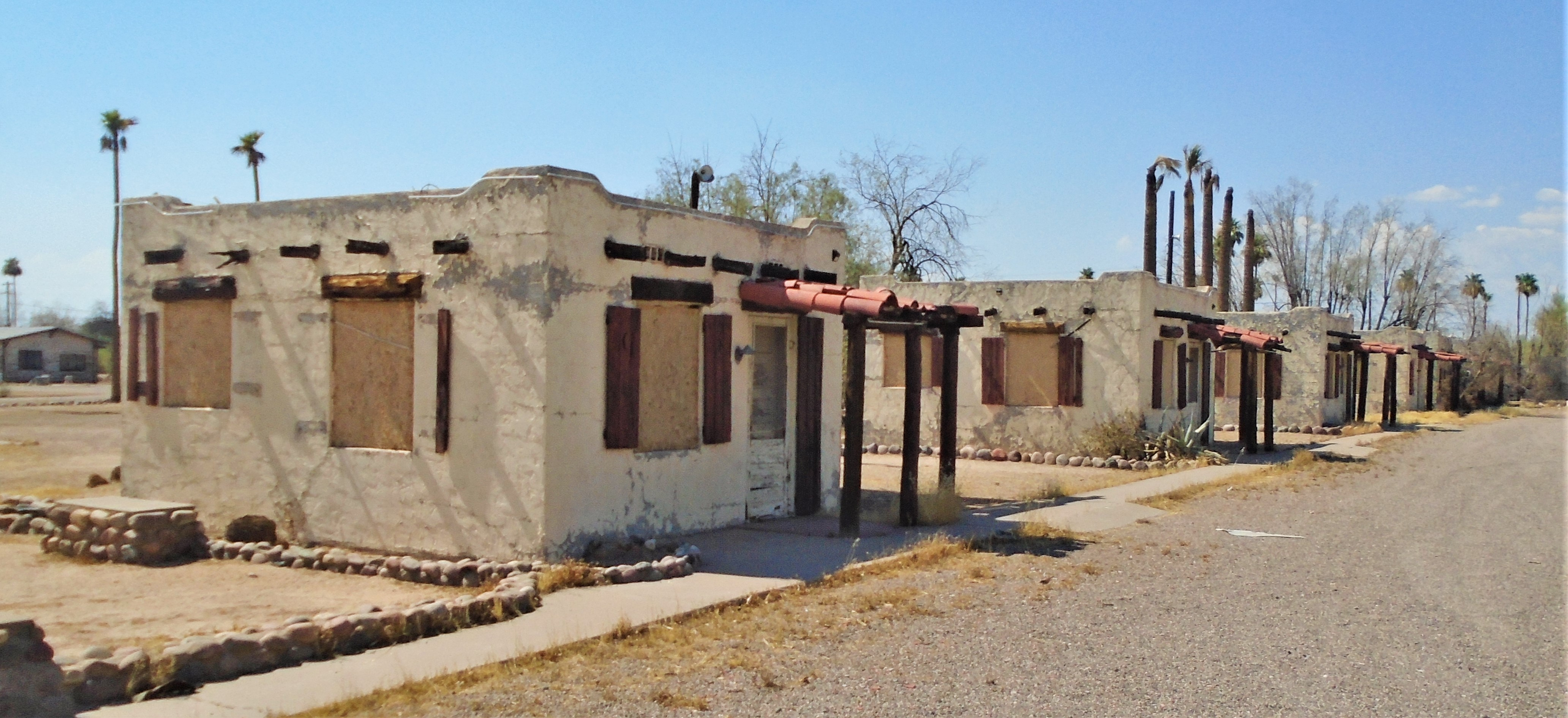
- Former hot springs cabins

- Location within Arizona Location within the United States
- Interactive map of Buckhorn Hot Mineral Wells
- Coordinates: 33°25′00″N 111°42′4″W
- Type: geothermal
- Temperature: 112 °F (44 °C)

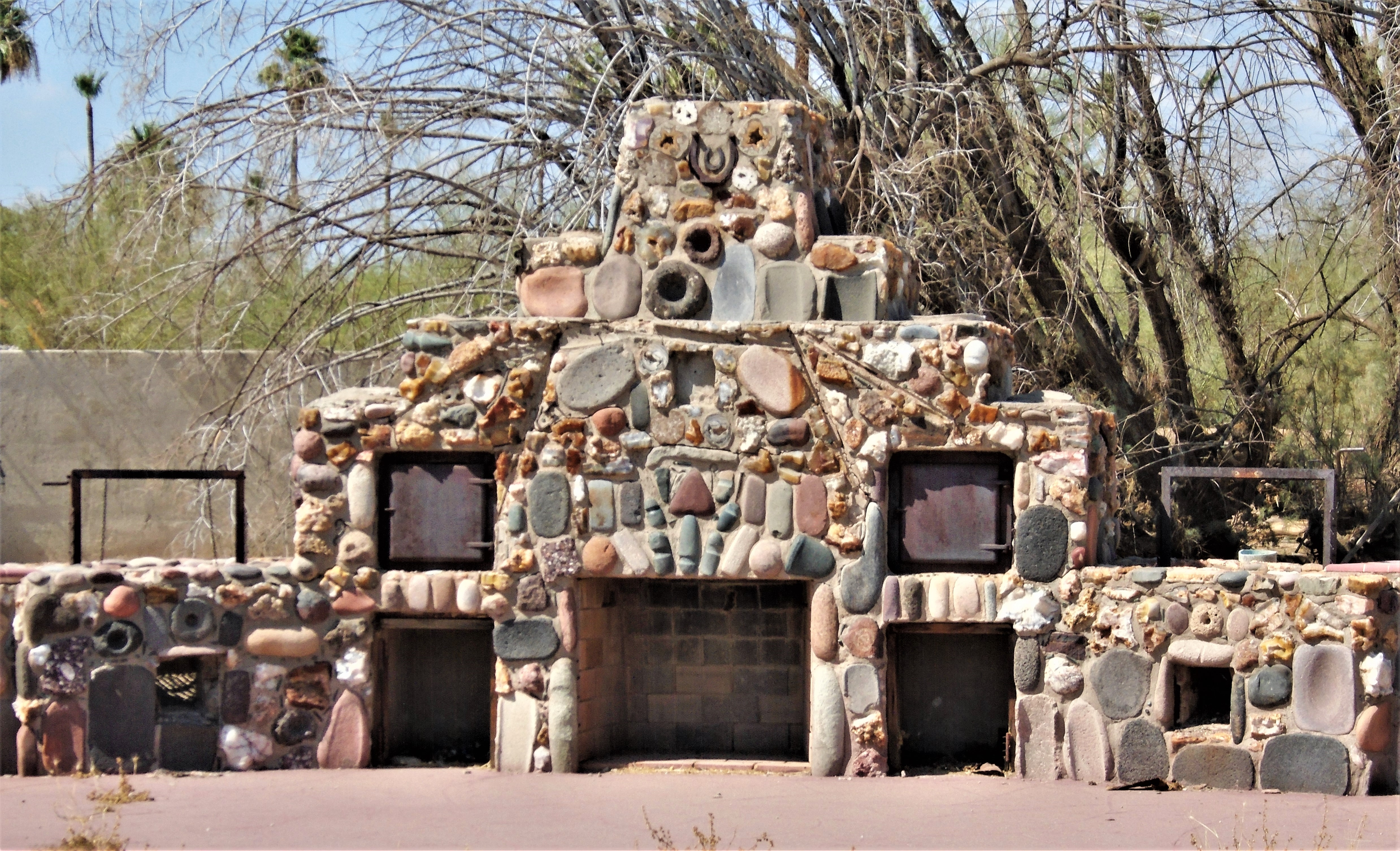
Fireplace at Buckhorn Mineral Wells site

Buckhorn Hot Mineral Wells also known as Buckhorn Baths, and Buckhorn Mineral Wells is a hot spring located seven miles East of Mesa, Arizona.

== History ==
For thousands of years indigenous peoples used thermal mineral springs for their healing properties. As European and Americans moved into the Western states, interest in mineral spas flourished as balenotheraputic "healing centers" and tourist attractions.

In 1936, Ted and Alice Sliger purchased the hot springs property to build a trading post, the Desert Wells Trading Post. In 1939, they "accidentally found" the hot springs while drilling a well for drinking water. They built a Pueblo Revival-style "spa motel" featuring a bathhouse fed by the hot springs, and a gas station. The site is now a historical landmark. The Sligers operated the hot spring establishment until 1999.

The Sligers advertised the hot springs as having curative powers "beneficial in the treatment of arthritis, neuritis, neuralgia, gout, anemia, sciatic, overweight, underweight, high blood pressure, nicotine poisoning, blood and skin diseases, kidney, bladder and liver troubles, chronically nervous and exhausted, inflammatory rheumatism, stomach disorders [and] rehabilitation following: strokes, polio, fractures. Also good for muscle toning and reconditioning."

The historical hot springs resort motel complex included 27 stone soaking tubs, and 15 Southwest-style cabins.

There have been efforts in 2021 to develop the former hot springs resort into multi-family housing units.

== Water profile ==
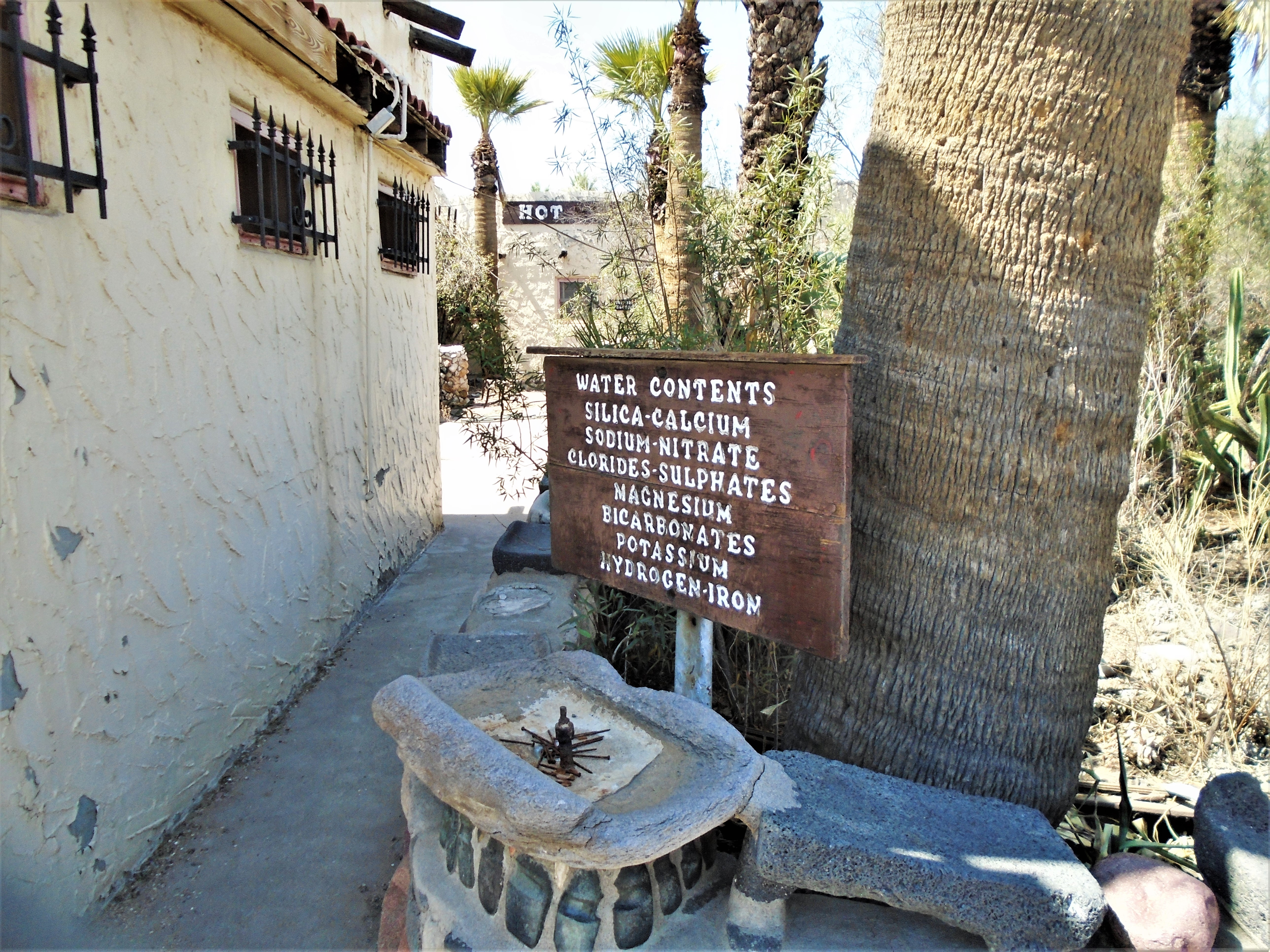
mineral water contents

The hot mineral water emerges from the source at temperatures between 112 °F and 128 °F. When first tapped in the 1930s, the water temperature measured 112 °F, however in 1958, after drilling a new 100-foot deep well, the water temperature rose to 128 °F. After building a cooling tower, the water temperature was decreased to 120 °F. According to signage at the site, the mineral content of the water includes silica, calcium, sodium, nitrate, fluoride, sulphate, magnesium, bicarbonate, potassium, hydrogen, iron.

== See also ==
- Buckhorn Baths Motel
- List of hot springs in the United States
