= Borden Milk Co. Creamery and Ice Factory =

- U.S. National Register of Historic Places
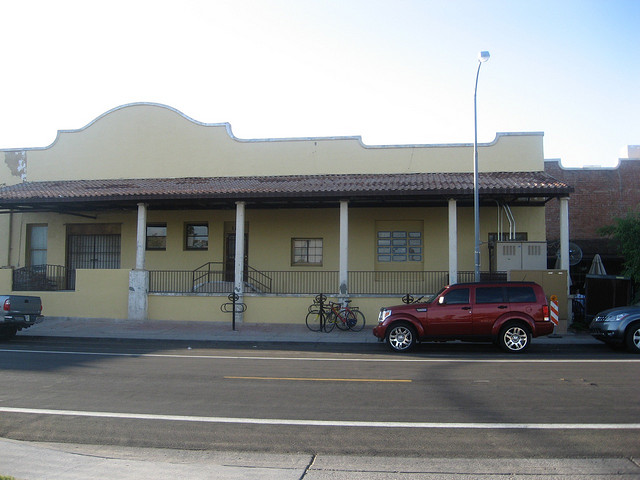
- Location: 1300-1360 E. 8th St., Tempe, Arizona
- Coordinates: 33°25′10.1994″N 111°54′57.5994″W
- Built: 1892
- Architectural style: Mission Revival
- NRHP reference No.: 84000171

Significant dates
- Added to NRHP: October 10, 1984
- Designated NRHP: Agricultural

The Borden Milk Co. Creamery and Ice Factory is a historical site in Tempe, Arizona. Built originally as an ice plant, it was altered to also produce pasteurized bottled milk. The Pacific Creamery Plant was sold in 1927, and it operated under the Borden name until its closure in 1953. The building stood empty until it was reopened as Four Peaks Brewery, a restaurant and regional brewery. The Borden operation had enough impact on the city that a new park was designated "Creamery Park" in 1999.

Built in the Mission Revival style, the building is almost entirely red brick, with wooden ceilings and a glass clerestory reaching as high as 35 feet, supported by steel suspension. The nine buildings were listed on the National Register of Historic Places in 1984.

The former creamery plant, now brewery, was featured on Ghost Adventures, a Discovery Channel show that focuses on paranormal places and topics.

== Gallery ==
Historic Borden buildings which consist of the address' 1300-1360
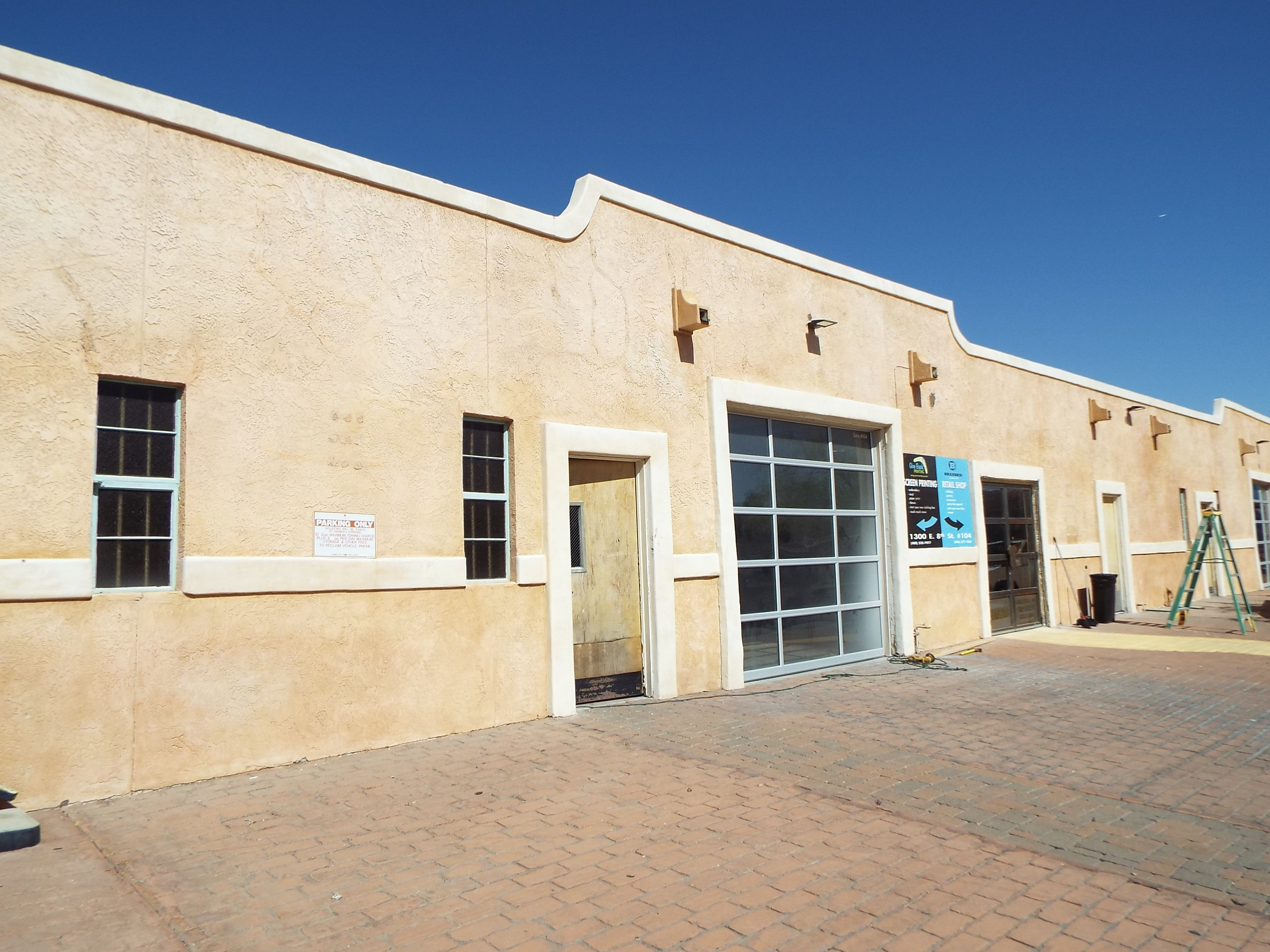
The Borden Milk Company , a.k.a. Creamery and Ice Factory . This particular buildings' address is 1300.

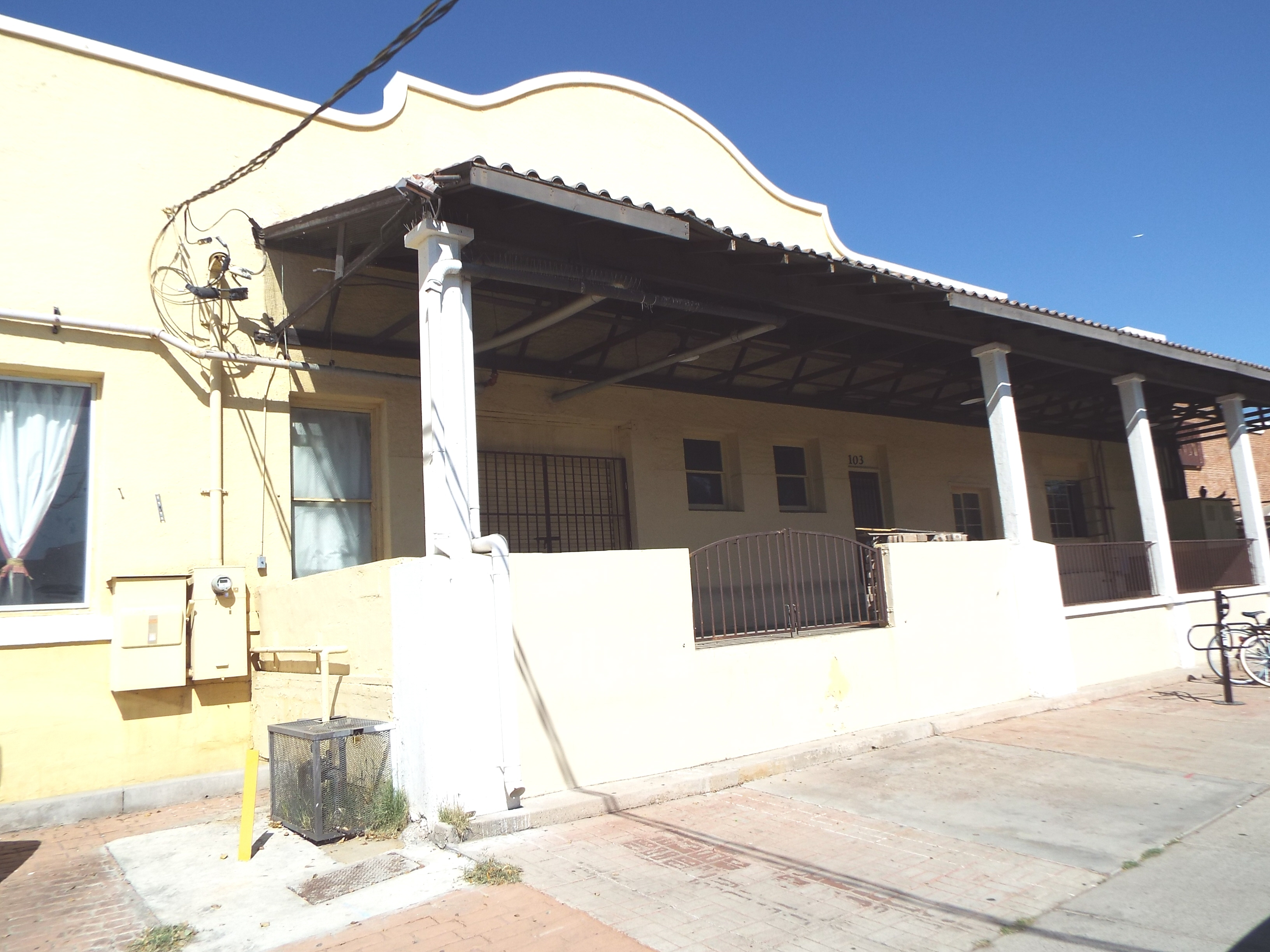
This particular buildings' address is 1340

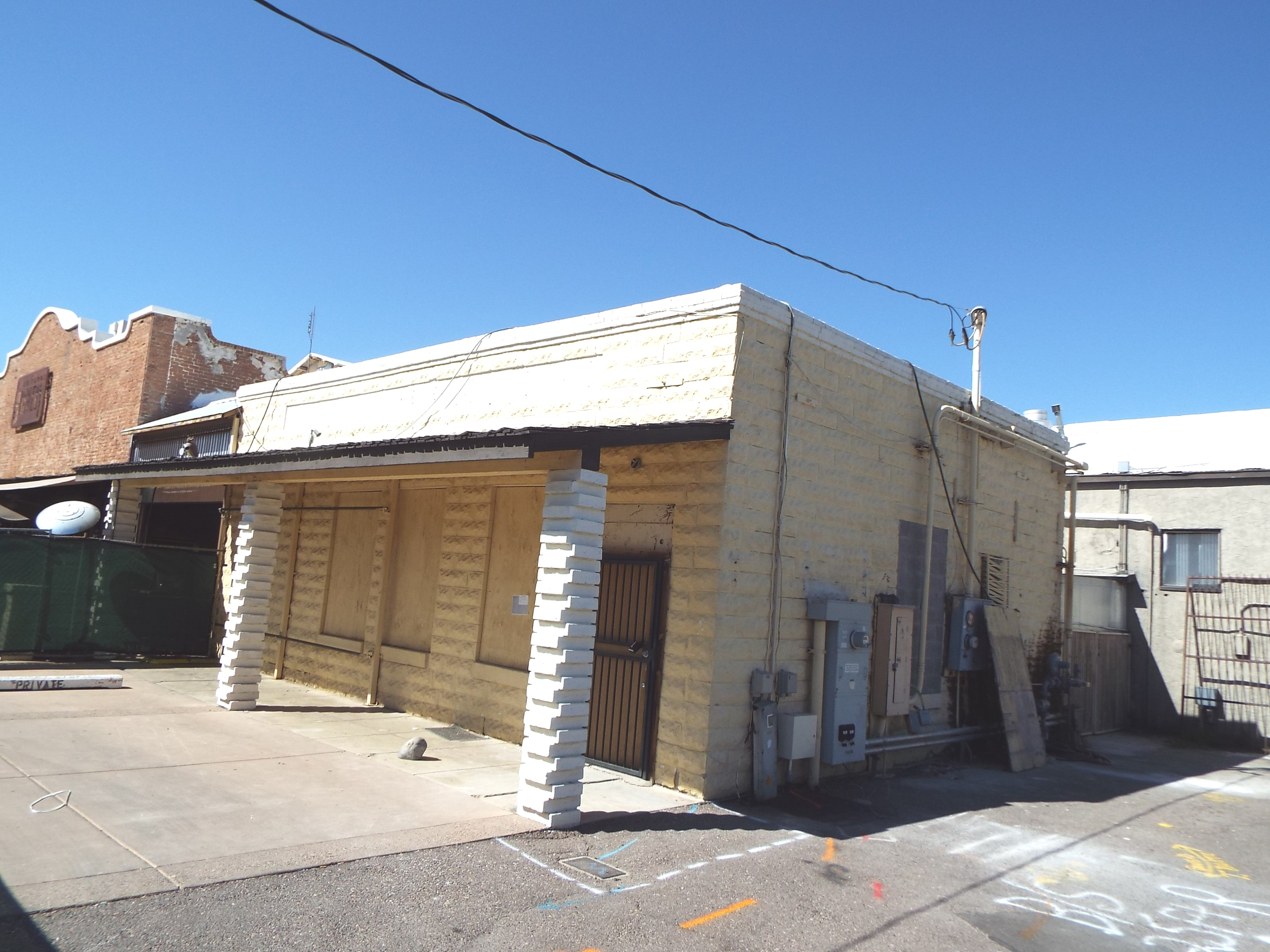
The particular address's of these buildings' are 1350 (Four Peaks Brewery) and 1360.

== See also ==
- National Register of Historic Places listings in Maricopa County, Arizona
- List of historic properties in Tempe, Arizona
