= Edward L. Jones House =

Historic house in Arizona, United States

- U.S. National Register of Historic Places
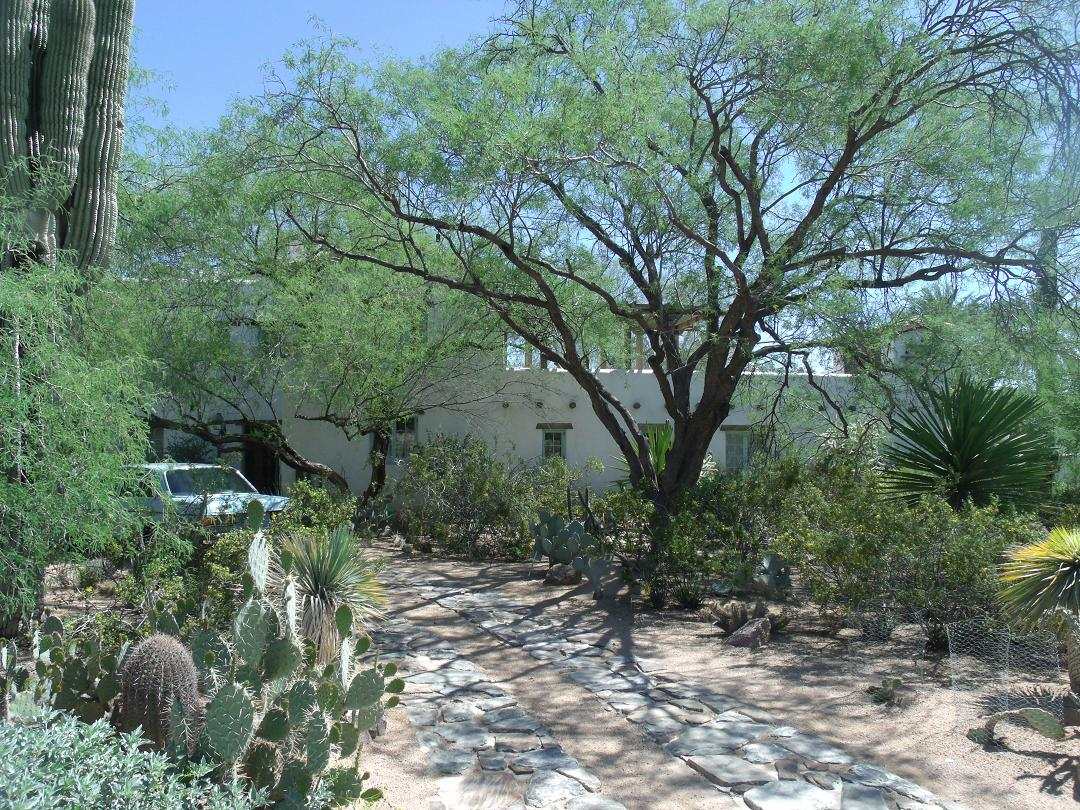

- Location within Arizona Location within the United States
- Location: 5555 N. Casa Blanca Dr., Paradise Valley, Arizona
- Coordinates: 33°31′3″N 111°56′17″W
- Area: 1.9 acres (0.77 ha)
- Architect: Bowes, Edward Loomis
- Architectural style: Pueblo, Mission/spanish Revival
- NRHP reference No.: 96001474
- Added to NRHP: December 13, 1996

The Edward L. Jones House is a historic house at 5555 North Casa Blanca Drive in Paradise Valley, Arizona. It is a 2-acre (0.81 ha) property including a two-story adobe house, an adobe pump house, and an adobe and wood-frame barn. Built in 1932, the main house is a good example of Pueblo and Monterrey adobe revival styles, with walls of colored stucco and a multicolor tile roof. The roof eaves show exposed viga beams, and the windows are wooden casements, with wrought iron railings.

The house was listed on the National Register of Historic Places in 1996.

== See also ==
- National Register of Historic Places listings in Maricopa County, Arizona
