= Wilbur Street Historic District =

- U.S. National Register of Historic Places
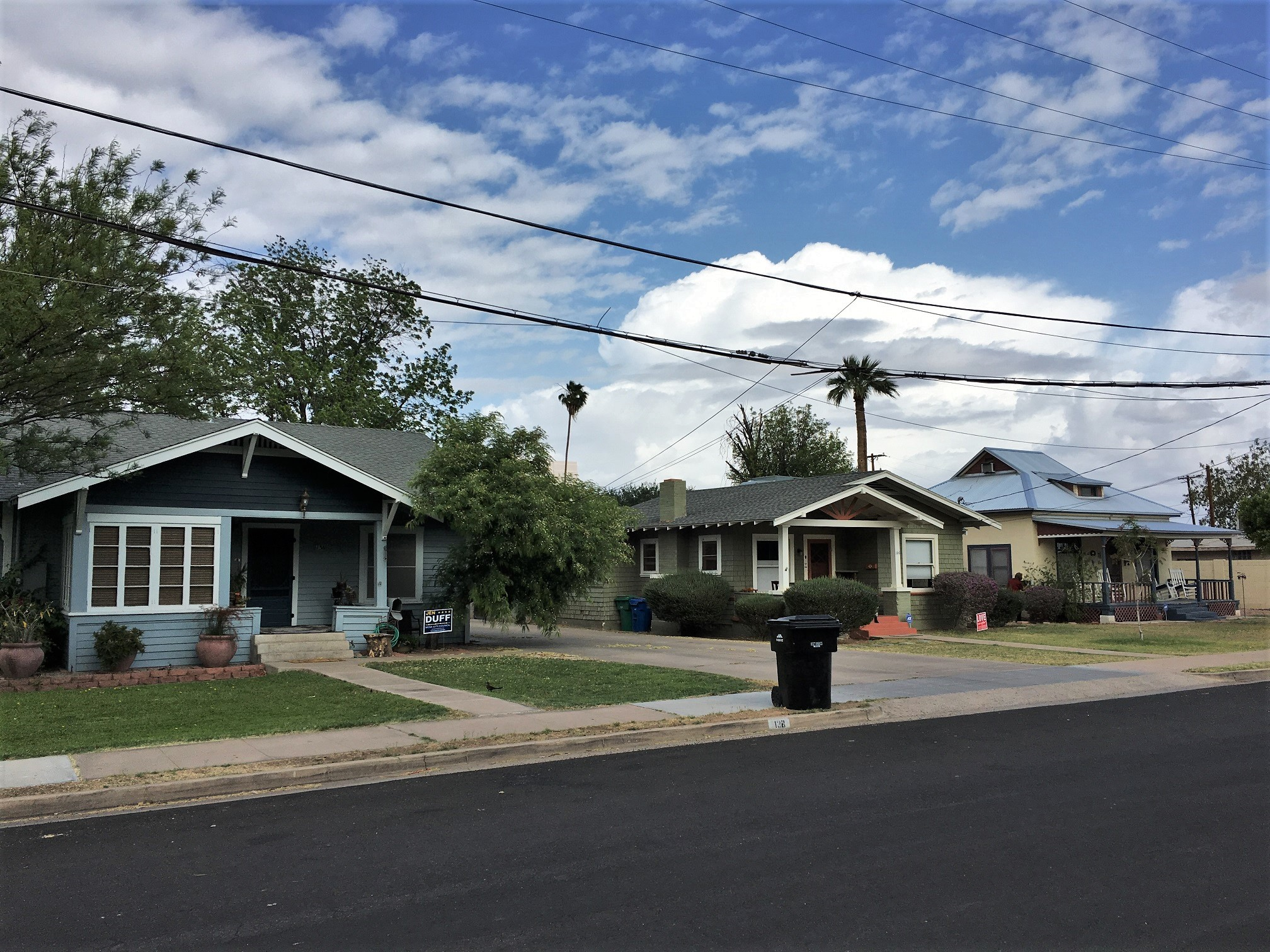

- Location within Arizona Location within the United States
- Location: Roughly between Pasadena St. and Pomeroy St., 1st St. to 3rd St. in Mesa, Arizona
- Coordinates: 33.418333°N 111.825°W
- NRHP reference No.: 99000708
- Added to NRHP: June 24, 1999

The West Second Street Historic District includes three residential subdivisions created in 1919–1922 within the original town site of Mesa, Arizona. The district boundary is Second Street on the north and First Street on the south. The western boundary is Pasadena Street and the eastern boundary is Pomeroy Street. The other streets in the district are Hibbert and Wilbur.

It was added to the National Register of Historic Places in 1999 and features many Bungalow style homes which were popular around 1920. There are a few Tudor Revival and Pueblo Revival homes as well as some Ranch homes that were built later after World War II.

An annual historic home tour, sponsored by the Mesa Historical Museum, allows the public to visit several homes in the district.

== See also ==
- List of National Historic Landmarks in Arizona
- National Register of Historic Places listings in Arizona
- National Register of Historic Places listings in Maricopa County, Arizona
