= Lehi, Mesa =

Neighborhood within Mesa, Arizona, US

Lehi
- neighborhood
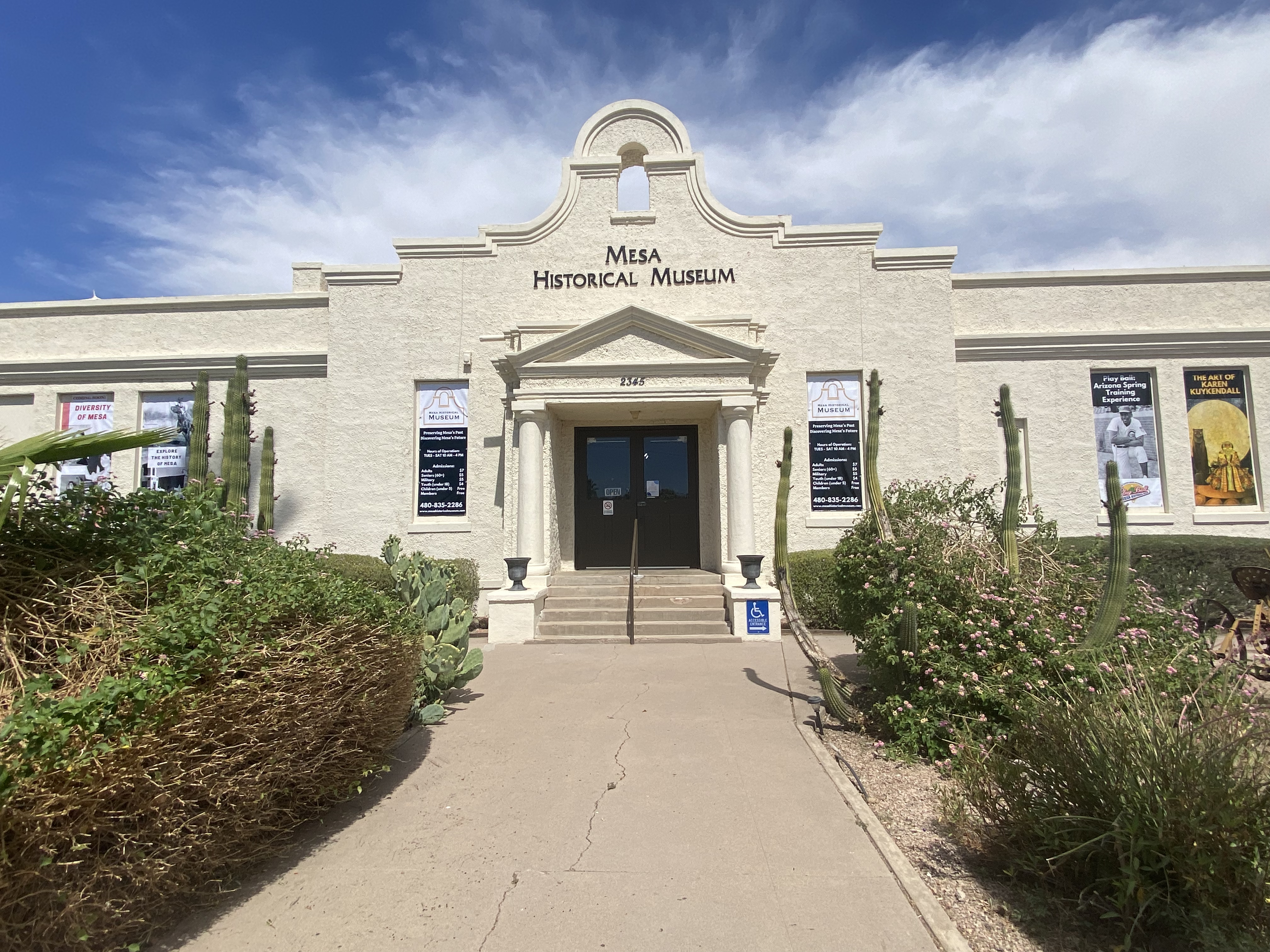
- Old Lehi School, now Mesa Historical Museum

- Location within Maricopa County, Arizona Location within Arizona Location within the United States
- Coordinates: 33°27′32″N 111°48′49″W

Lehi is a neighborhood within Mesa, Arizona. Lehi existed prior to the founding of Mesa, and was annexed by its much larger former neighbor in 1970. It is now the northern limit of central Mesa.

Lehi is adjacent to the Salt River on the north, the Consolidated Canal to the south, and a portion of Arizona State Route 202 runs through the area. It also borders the Salt River Pima-Maricopa Indian Community, and has a long history with it.

Properties of note include the Old Lehi School, which was placed on the National Register of Historic Places in August 2001, and is currently the home of the Mesa Historical Museum.

== History ==
Lehi was settled in 1877 by Mormons, under the direction of Daniel W. Jones. Jones had been commissioned by Brigham Young to start a colony within the Salt River Valley of the Arizona Territory. The settlement party left the Utah Territory from St. George, and arrived at the site in March 1877. Jones' invitation to local Native Americans to live with them became a point of controversy, and half of the initial colony left, moving on to found St. David, Arizona.

Lehi was initially known as Jonesville and Fort Utah; it did not receive the name of Lehi until 1883 when LDS Apostle Brigham Young, Jr. recommended renaming the settlement after the prophet Lehi from the Book of Mormon.

== See also ==
- Mormon Corridor
- The Church of Jesus Christ of Latter-day Saints in Arizona
- Westwood High School (Mesa, Arizona)
