= West Second Street Historic District (Mesa, Arizona) =

- U.S. National Register of Historic Places
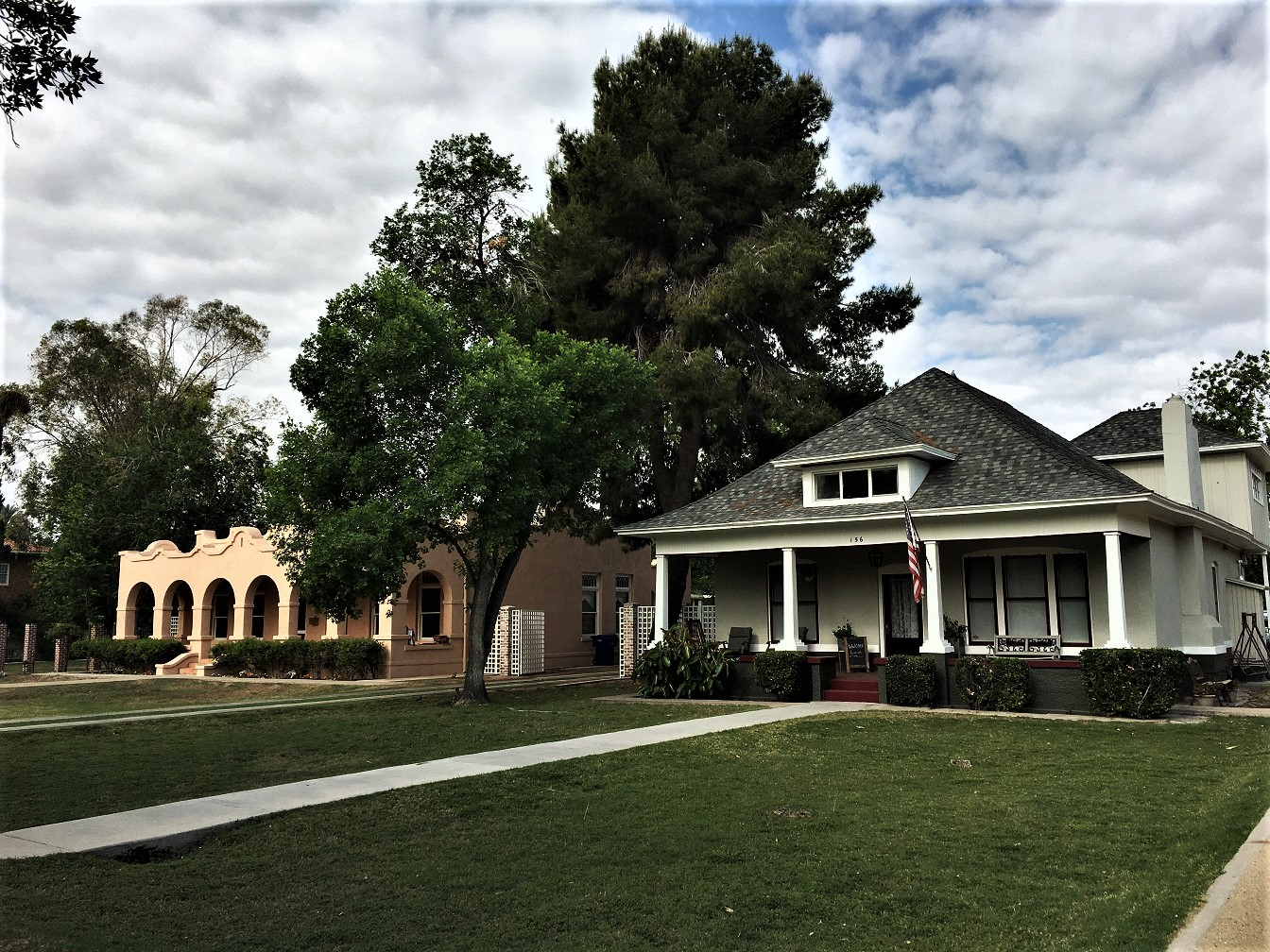

- Location within Arizona Location within the United States
- Location: Roughly bounded by Robson St., University Dr. and MacDonald St. in Mesa, Arizona
- Coordinates: 33.419444°N 111.833333°W
- NRHP reference No.: 99000707, 03000531 (boundary increase)
- Added to NRHP: 1999

The West Second Street Historic District is the oldest historic district in the city of Mesa, Arizona. It was added to the National Register of Historic Places in 1999 and features a greater variety of architectural styles than other historic districts in the city. Styles represented include Colonial Revival, Spanish Colonial Revival, Tudor Revival, Mission Revival, and Pueblo Revival. The district includes many homes of Mesa's most prominent families from its early history.

The original boundaries of the district were roughly between Robson St. and Center St., from 1st St. to 3rd St. In 2003, the district was expanded to include the entire area roughly bounded by Robson St., University Dr. and MacDonald St.

An annual historic home tour, sponsored by the Mesa Historical Museum, allows the public to visit several homes in the district.

== See also ==
- List of National Historic Landmarks in Arizona
- National Register of Historic Places listings in Arizona
- National Register of Historic Places listings in Maricopa County, Arizona
