= Floralcroft Historic District =

- U.S. National Register of Historic Places
- Location: Bounded by State Ave., 61st Ave., Myrtle Ave. and 59th Ave.
- Built: 1928
- NRHP reference No.: 05001505
- Added to NRHP: April 6, 2006

The Floralcroft Historic District, established in 1928 by local real estate developer Flora Mae Gillett-Statler, is a historic neighborhood in Glendale, Arizona. The founder, Flora Mae Gillett-Statler, was born May 29, 1890, to Charles E. and Rachel E. Gillett (née Kuns). Charles Gillett was a Protestant clergyman, personal friend of Governor George W.P. Hunt, and was among the first residents of Glendale. The name Floralcroft was chosen by Flora Mae, who named the subdivision after herself. She platted Floralcroft in 1928, intent on establishing a respectable neighborhood for herself and her two children. She lived in the neighborhood from the completion of her home at 5941 West Northview Avenue until her death on October 4, 1953.

== See also ==
- Glendale, Arizona
- List of historic properties in Chandler, Arizona
- List of historic properties in Glendale, Arizona
- List of historic properties in Phoenix, Arizona
- List of historic properties in Tempe, Arizona
- List of National Historic Landmarks in Arizona
- National Register of Historic Places listings in Arizona
- National Register of Historic Places listings in Maricopa County, Arizona
