= Norton Allen =

American artist

Norton Allen (1909–1997) was an American artist and avocational archaeologist who worked in the American Southwest, primarily in California and Arizona.

For almost half a century before his death, Allen was the anonymous but widely revered draftsman for the outstanding maps that appeared in nearly every issue of Desert Magazine. As an archaeologist, he was an expert on Hohokam culture and the archaeology of the Gila Bend area in Arizona. Allen's father, Ernest G. Allen, was involved in many of his excavations including those in the Gila Bend area.

For more than 40 winter seasons, Norton Allen, along with his wife Ethel and his father Ernest, salvaged archaeological materials that were in danger of being destroyed by expanding agricultural projects fed by water from the Gila River. He also conducted small excavations in the San Pedro Valley, southern Utah, and southwestern Colorado. It was Allen's work and discoveries, particularly at the Gatlin Site, one of the few documented Hohokam platform mounds, that was the motivating force behind the excavations in the Painted Rocks Reservoir conducted by Arizona State Museum archaeologists William Wasley and Alfred Johnson from 1959 to 1964.

In 1996 the Arizona Archaeological and Historical Society awarded the Victor R. Stoner Award to Norton and Ethel in recognition of their lifelong contributions to archaeological preservation and helping bring knowledge of the Hohokam in the Gila Bend area to the public's attention.
