= Mesa Historical Museum =

Museum in Mesa, Arizona

The Mesa Historical Museum
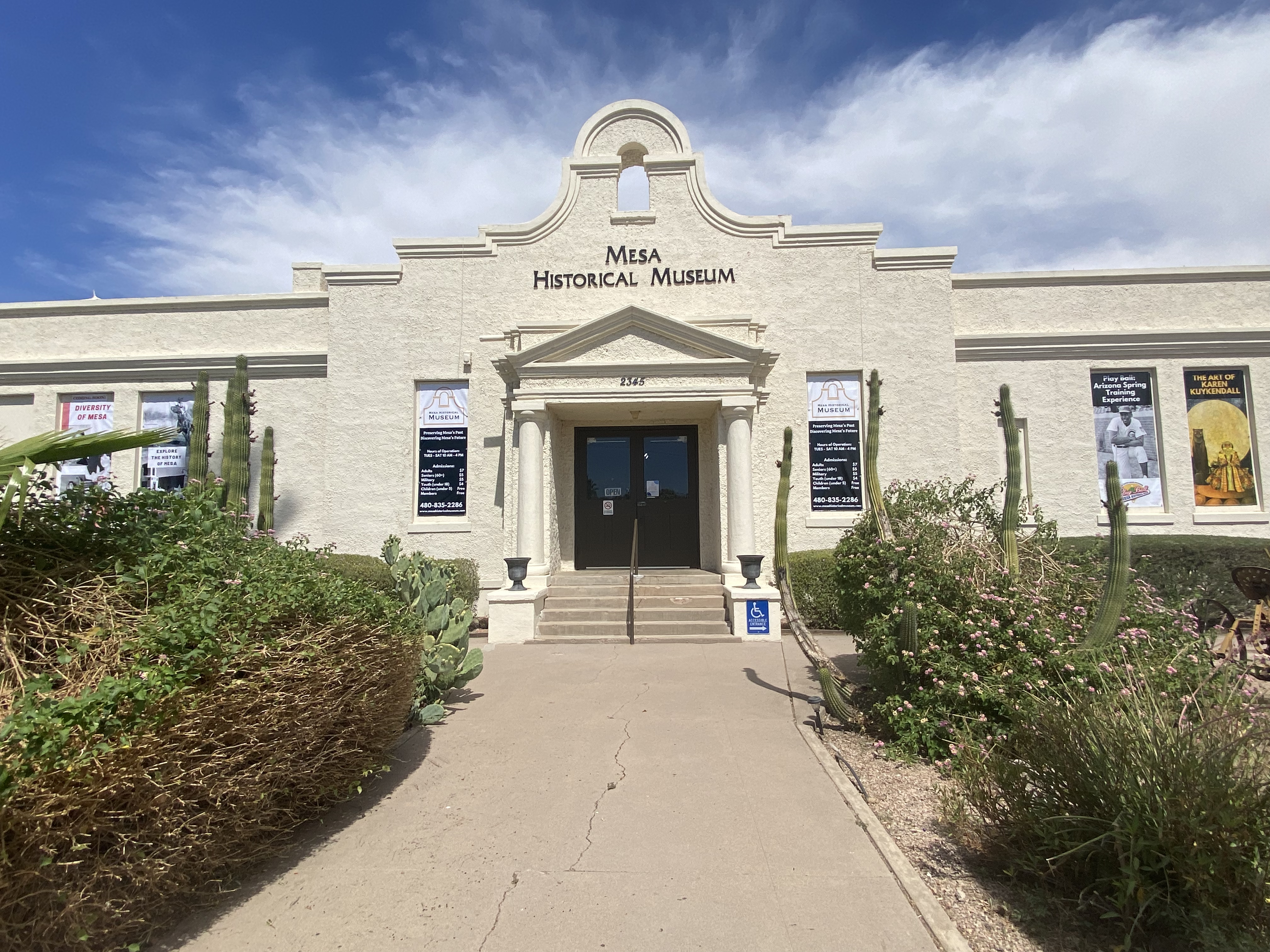

- Location within Arizona
- Established: 1987
- Location: 2345 N. Horne St., Mesa, ArizonaMesa, Arizona
- Coordinates: 33.4585°N 111.8132°W
- Type: History museum
- Website: www.mesahistoricalmuseum.com
- Lehi School
- U.S. National Register of Historic Places
- Area: 5 acres (2.0 ha)
- Built: 1913
- Built by: Works Progress Administration
- Architectural style: Mission/spanish Revival, Moderne
- NRHP reference No.: 01000906
- Added to NRHP: August 30, 2001

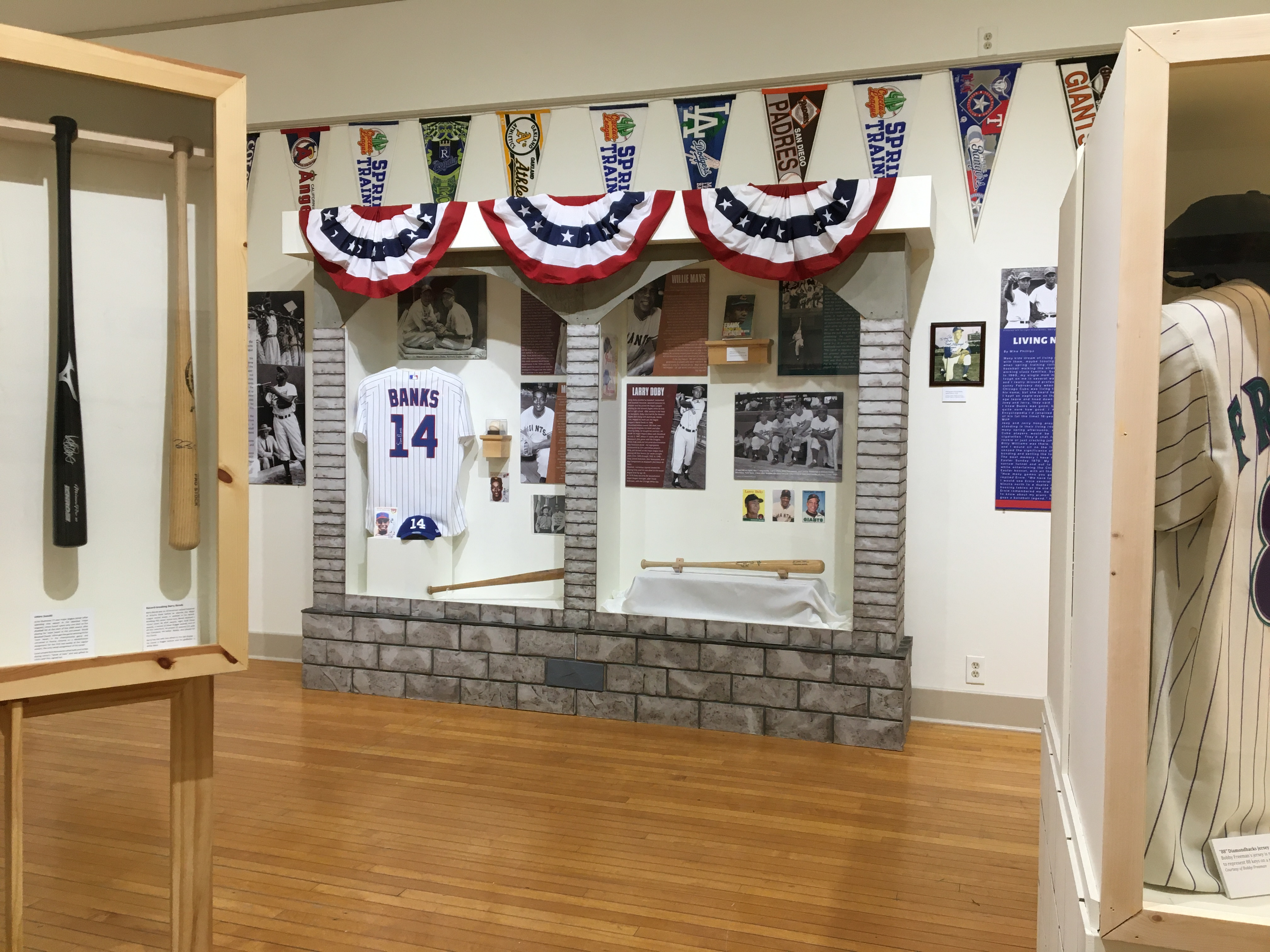

The Mesa Historical Museum in Mesa, Arizona, United States was opened in 1987 by the Mesa Historical Society to preserve the history of Mesa, Arizona.

The museum's exhibits include a comprehensive history of Mesa, a replica of an early adobe one-room schoolhouse, as well as additional galleries of changing exhibits. The museum also maintains a large collection of historic agricultural equipment.

The museum buildings are in fact its largest artifacts. The main museum building was built in 1913-1914 for use as the Lehi School in what was then Lehi, Arizona. The auditorium was built in the 1930s as a Works Progress Administration project. The two-building complex was added to the National Register of Historic Places in 2001 as the "Lehi School".

In 2008, the museum began developing a popular exhibit about Spring Training (baseball) in Arizona, called "Play Ball: The Cactus League Experience." The exhibition has since expanded to locations throughout Maricopa County.

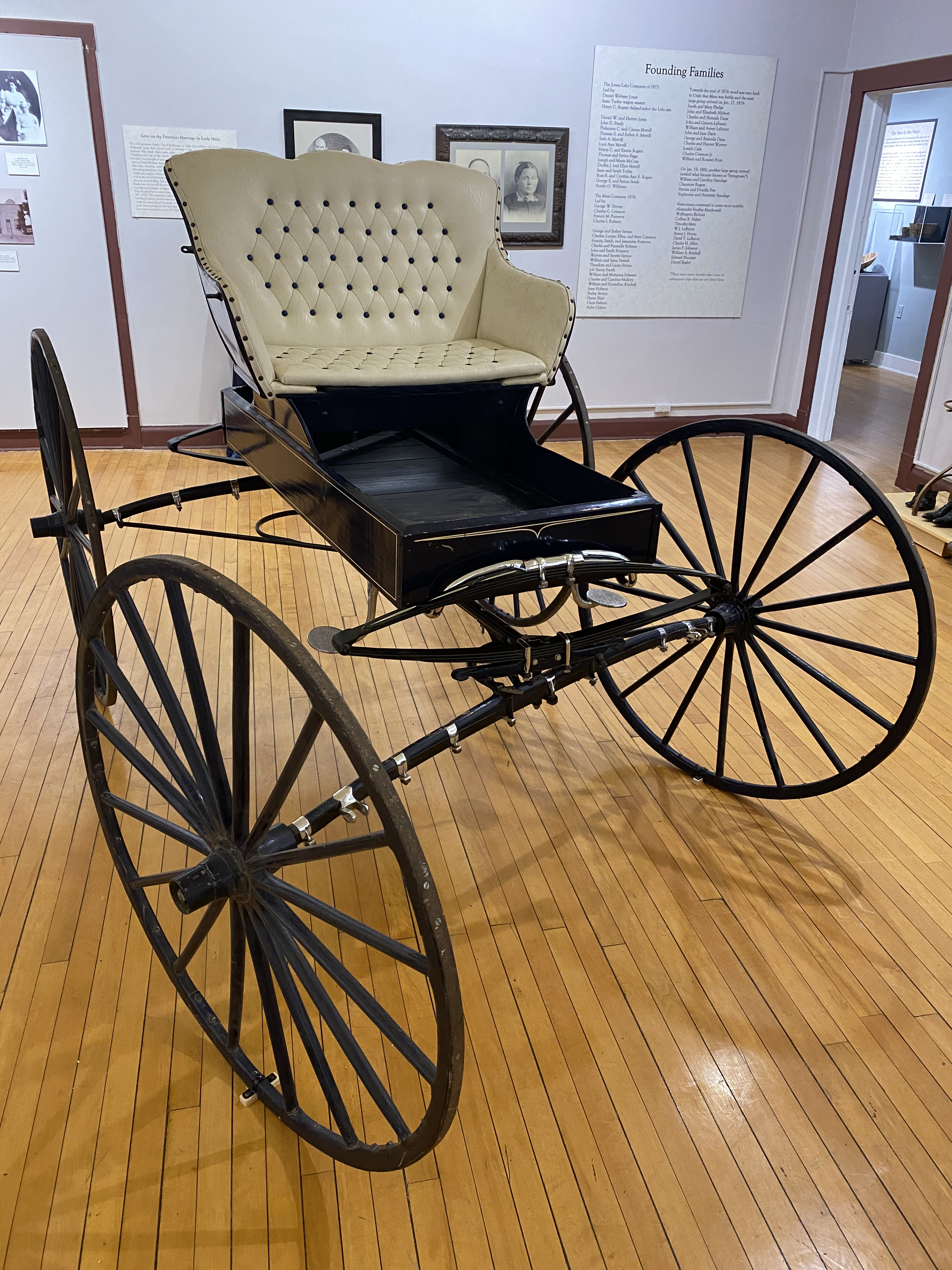
Auto Seat Runabout Buggy on display at the Mesa Historical Museum
