= Buckhorn Baths Motel =

Historic defunct mineral hot spring resort in Mesa, Arizona

Coordinates: 33°25′00″N 111°42′4″W

- U.S. National Register of Historic Places
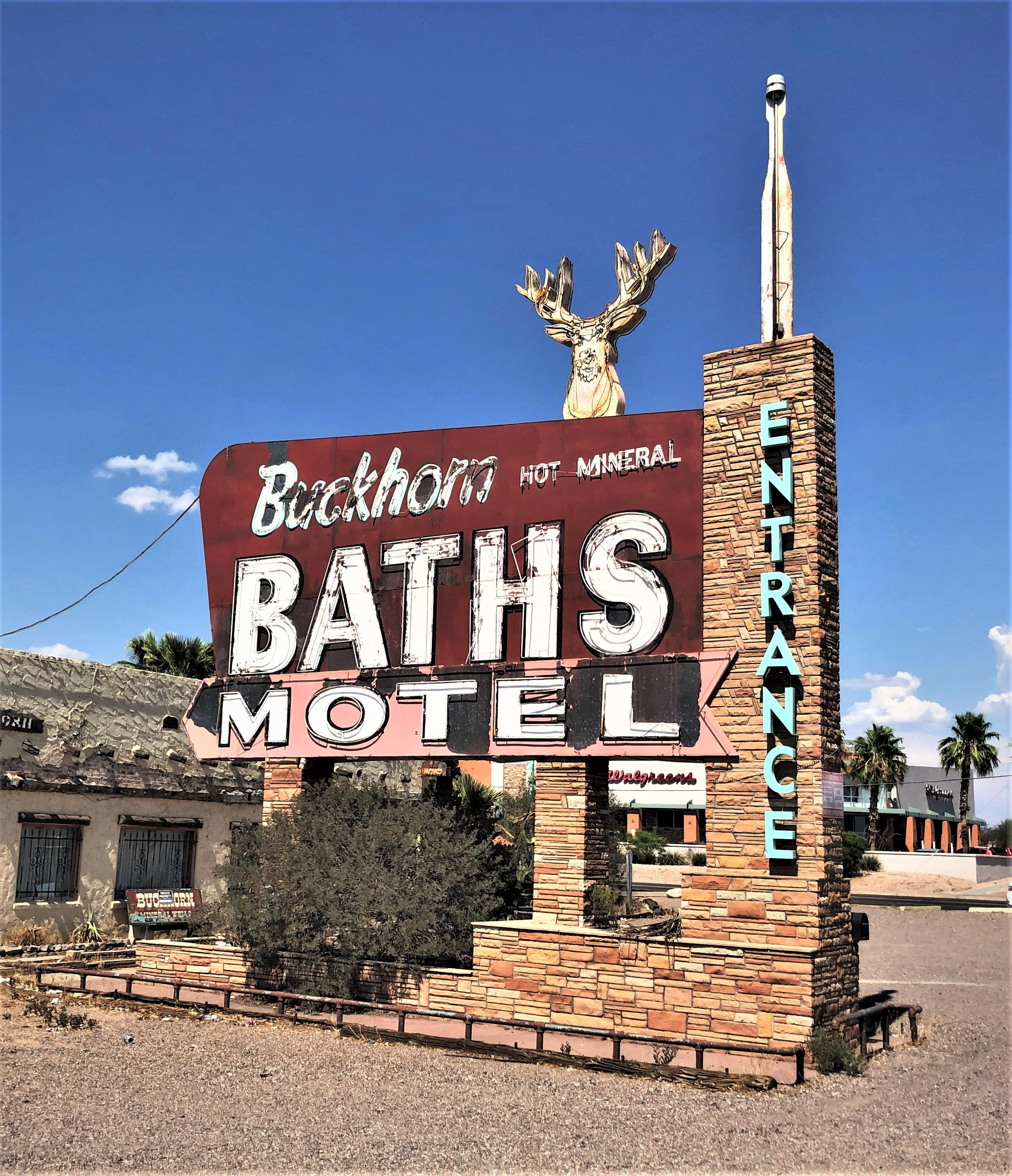
- (2021)

- Location within Arizona Location within the United States
- Location: 5900 E. Main Street, Mesa, Arizona
- Built: 1936-1947
- Architectural style: Pueblo Revival
- NRHP reference No.: 05000421
- Added to NRHP: May 10, 2005

The Buckhorn Baths Motel at 5900 East Main Street at the corner of North Recker Road in Mesa, Arizona was a small mineral hot springs resort which offered a bathhouse as well as both cottages and motel rooms for overnight stays. Beginning in 1936 as a gas station and store, Ted and Alice Sliger developed the property into a resort complex which opened in 1939 and was virtually complete as of 1947. It continued to operate until 1999, when the bathhouse closed, although the motel and "Wildlife Museum" continued until 2004.

Although built over the course of more than a decade, the buildings are all designed in the Pueblo Revival style. The majority of the complex – but not buildings on the adjoining parcel of land to the west, also owned by the Singers and integrated into the resort complex – was added to the National Register of Historic Places in 2005.

== History ==
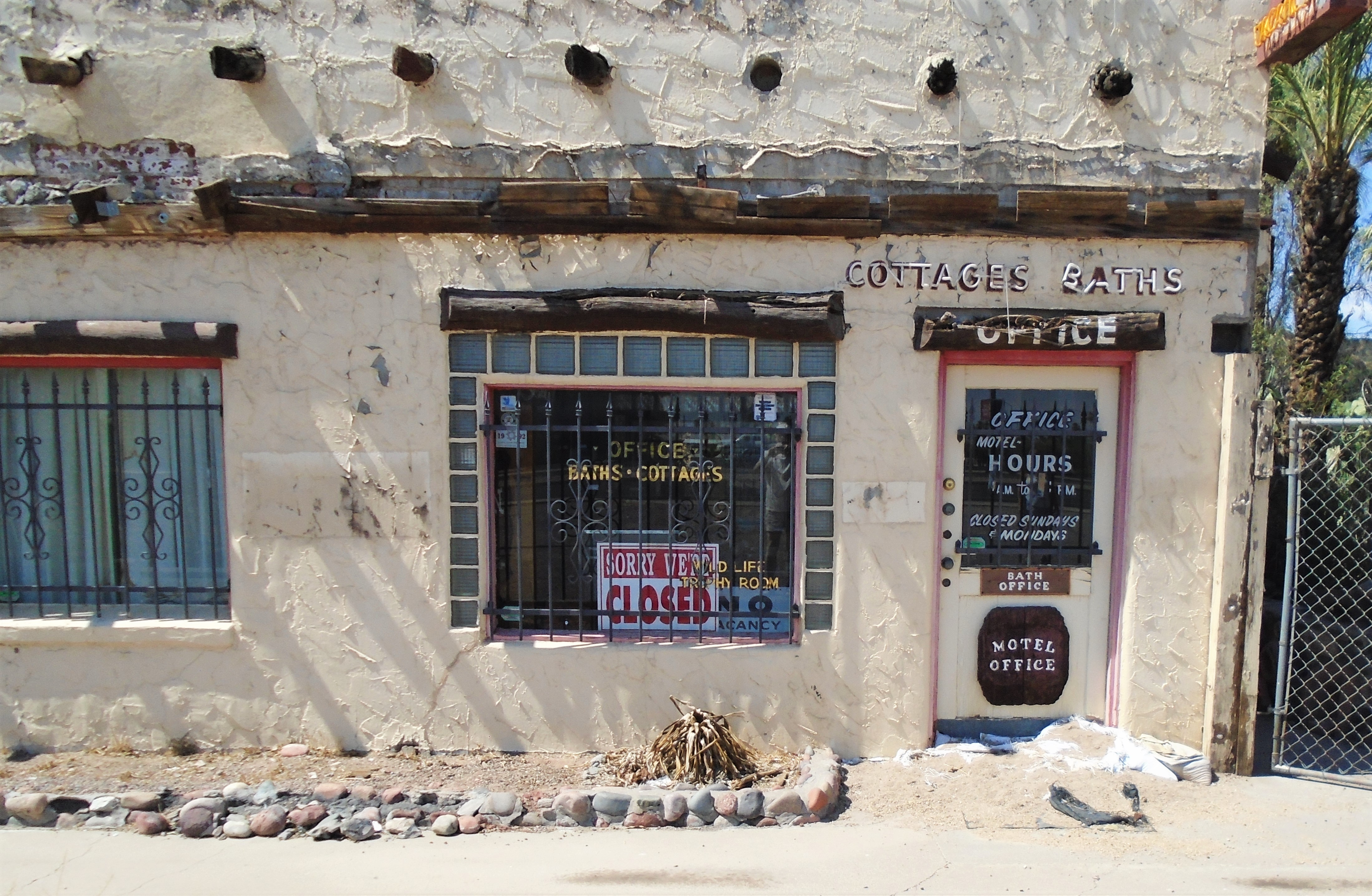
The office (2021)

In 1936, Ted Sliger's store and lunch counter in Mesa, "Desert Wells", burned down, destroying his collection of taxidermy, except for one buckhorn deer, which was on loan. He and his wife, Alice, bought a 10-acre (4.0 ha) property in the open desert seven miles (11 km)outside of Mesa – they would eventually add parcels of land to the west and north (Note: The property to the north was at one point a trailer park; only some concrete pads and a small restroom remain.) – bought a house from a neighbor and had it moved to the property. The constructed a store from bricks scavenged from a demolished Mesa school, from which they sold gasoline and a variety of products, including groceries, hunting and fishing licenses, fishing tackle, and Native American jewelry and rugs. In 1938 they expanded the store in order to display Ted's taxidermy work – a service he provided to hunters and fisherman; this would evolve into a "Wildlife Museum" with over 400 specimens. Because they had to haul in all of their drinking water, in 1939 the Sligers sunk a well, but the water they struck was 112 °F (44 °C) mineral water. To exploit their new find, they build a bathhouse with the capacity of 75 people, and cottages to accommodate those who wished to stay overnight. (Note: Although the cottages had a small kitchenette with sink, stove and refrigerator, they did not have showers or tubs, since the guests were expected to bathe in the resort's bathhouse. The cottages are identical except for two which shared a carport, while the others had their own.) They named their business "Buckhorn", after the one piece of Ted's taxidermy which had been saved from the fire.

The road which run along the Sliger's property – now Mesa's East Main Street – was both the principle commercial street in the city of Mesa, but also the most import tourist road in the Salt River Valley. It connected Phoenix with such recreational and tourist areas as the lakes on the dammed Salt River, the Superstition Mountains, the Apache Trail and the small mining towns to the east, such as Superior, Miami and Globe. Thus the new resort was well-placed to attract visitors at a time when automobile tourism was increasing after the end of the Depression, and automobile tourist facilities were becoming increasing visible on the landscape – by 1939, when the Buckhorn opened, there were 13,000 such "motor courts" in the U.S. These would soon develop into the more sophisticated "motel", a motor court with some of the amenities of a hotel. (Note: Although the neon sign they put up refers to the resort as a "Motel", the Sligers never used this word in their advertising.)

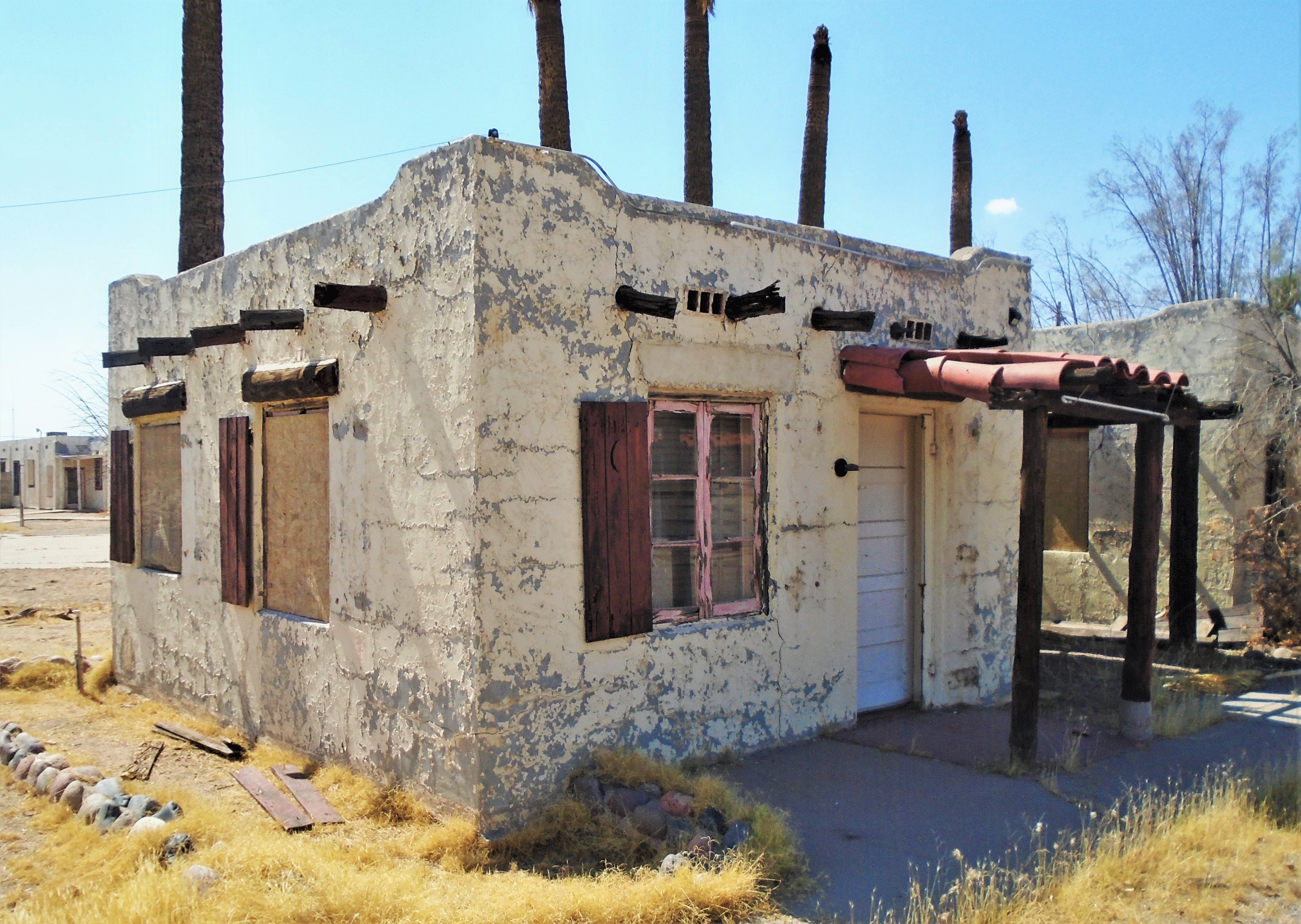
One of the cottages (2021)

At the time, mineral spring were very popular in the U.S. due to their supposedly curative value, and to the social status which came from "taking the waters" at many of the spas. In the desert west, especially, where people came to take advantage of the hot dry climate in tending to their respiratory problems, such as asthma and tuberculosis, the appeal of such mineral water treatments was a natural fit. The sliger's advertised their resort in 1950 as "beneficial in the treatment of arthritis, neuritis, neuralgia, gout, anemia, sciatic, overweight, underweight, high blood pressure, nicotine poisoning, blood and skin diseases, kidney, bladder and liver troubles, chronically nervous and exhausted, inflammatory rheumatism, stomach disorders [and] rehabilitation following: strokes, polio, fratures. Also good for muscle toning and reconditioning."

Between 1940 and 1947, the Sligers improved and extended their asset, expanding the bathhouse – which, because it was built in stages, is irregular and sprawling in plan – building the motel, and adding commercial space to the Main Street building. They closed the gas station, removed the porte-cochere which had sheltered the gas pumps, and added the large sandstone-supported neon sign which advertised the "Buckhorn Hot Mineral Baths Motel". Sometime during World War II, additional double cottages were moved to the property west of the original site and integrated into the resort. (Note: These buildings are not included in the NRHP listing.) The motel became a Greyhound bus depot in 1942, and in 1947 the New York Giants baseball selected the Buckhorn for their base of operations during spring training. The bus depot closed in 1972, the same year that the Giants moved to a hotel in Casa Grande.

Although from Main Street, the front structure appears to be one building, in large part it is a collection of individual buildings. The office/owner's residence and the museum/lobby share a common wall but the roof of each is different. The post office and the store office are completely separate buildings, with walkways between the which provide access from the front parking lot to the interior of the complex. However, all of these units share an arcade and parapet and, most importantly, their Pueblo Revival design. The use of mortared stones and metates (Indian grindstones) to build walls and other decorative objects on the grounds is another unifying factor.

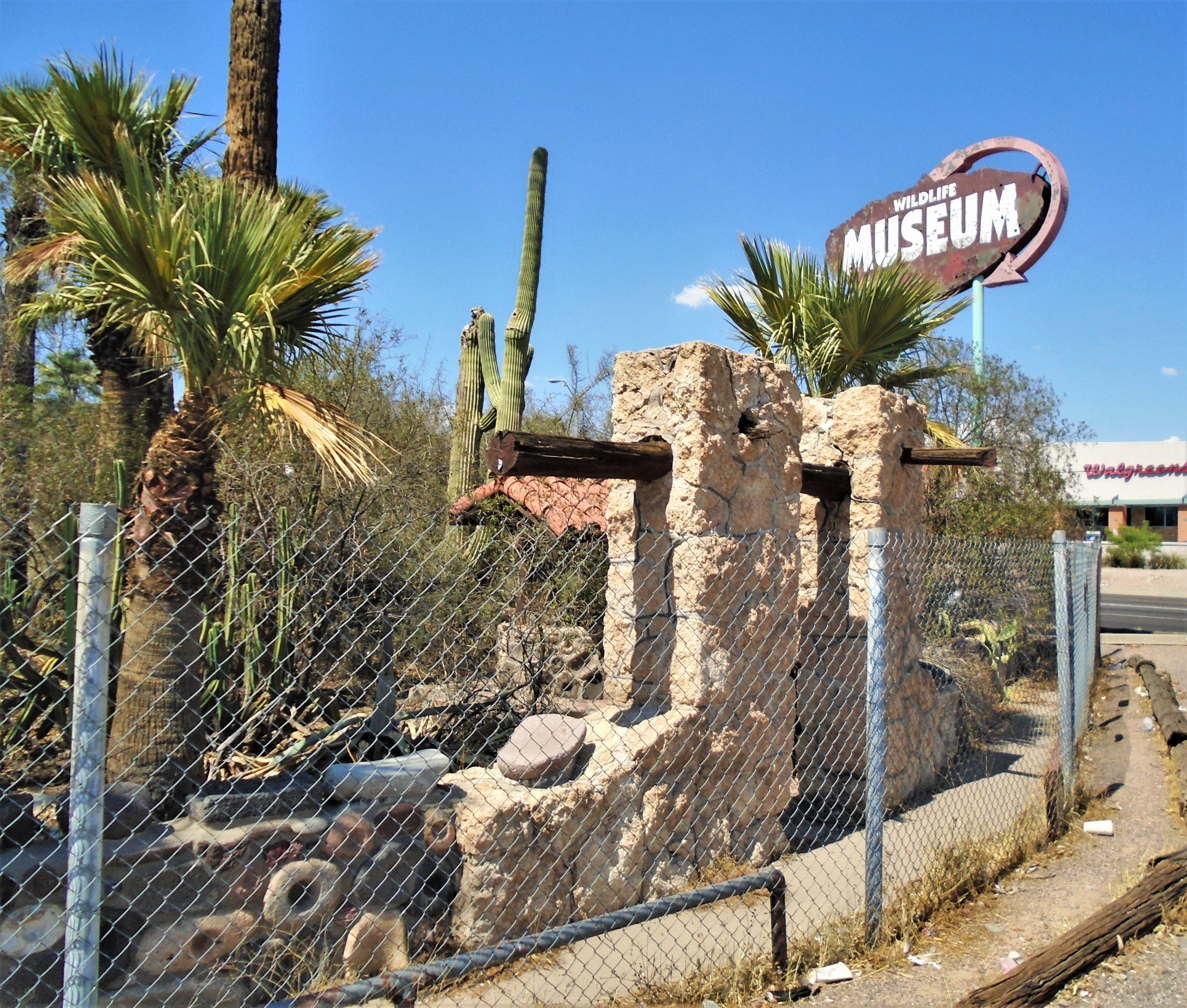
Part of the Cactus Garden, nd the sign advertising the "Wildlife Museum", which was a large display of taxidermy specimens stuffed by Ted Sliger, one of the owners of the resort. (2021)

At its peak, 100 guests could stay at the Buckhorn, which offered a cafe and dining room, a gift shop, a beauty salon, a taxidermy museum – which also displayed Native American relics and served as a lobby and television room, a cactus garden, and a post office – contracted in 1956 and closed in 1983. The motel offered amenities such as an 18-hole desert golf course, fireplace/barbecue area and a shuffleboard court, and the grounds featured manicured lawns, palm trees and other foliage, and decorative pools and fountains. Four additional wells were dug, and by 1974 the bathhouse had separate entrances for men and women and 27 private baths, as well as whirlpool baths, massage and cooling rooms, and a facility for "colon therapy". The resort employed white-uniformed trained massage therapists, physical therapists and nurses. The mineral water in the baths was 106 °F (41 °C).

Throughout the development of the Buckhorn Baths complex, the city of Mesa was expanding, and in 1974, the motel became part of the city. After the death of Ted Sliger in 1984, Alice Sliger continued to run the resort. The baths closed in 1999, and the motel and museum in 2004. Some of the motel units continued to be occupied as apartments. (Note: 2004 is the date of closure given in the NRHP application, which was written at that time, but more recent sources give 2007 as the date that the motel and museum closed.)

== Recent ==
In 2012, the voters of Mesa passed a $70 million parks bond issue, which included $5 million for the purchase and renovation of the Buckhorn property by the city, however the sale never took place, falling through in 2015 due to disagreements among the Sliger family, who still owned the property at that time.

The Sligers sold the 1,562-acre (632 ha) property in 2017 to the McHenry Family Trust, doing business as Avenue Shoppes LLC, for $2.15 million. It was to be developed by Cameron Cooke of Urban Fabric Builders, who said their watchwords would be "deconstruct not demolish" and that they would "[try] to protect the historically significant elements of the site." The Mesa Preservation Foundation had previously estimated that a full restoration could cost as much as $10 million, including the cost of buying the property. The mineral water continues to be available to flow, but new pipes would be required, as the old one were cast iron. In 2019 the new owners donated the taxidermy collection to a biodiversity group at Arizona State University. The School of Life Sciences' Natural History Collection catalogued over 300 of the more than 400 specimens, and will attempt to donate the rest to other organizations.

In 2021 it was report that there was the possibility that a boutique hotel would open in the Buckhorn buildings. Ajay Verma, who bought the property after it fell into receivership, had not filed any formal plans, but the report said that the project was planned to be financed by the demolition of some parts of the complex to make way for building at least 200 1,300-square-foot (120 m^{2}) three-bedroom townhouses with two-car garages. Mesa architect Tim Boyle is point-person for the project, and he brought in another architect who specializes in historic preservation, Ron Peters, also from Mesa.

== See also ==
- Buckhorn Hot Mineral Wells

== Gallery ==
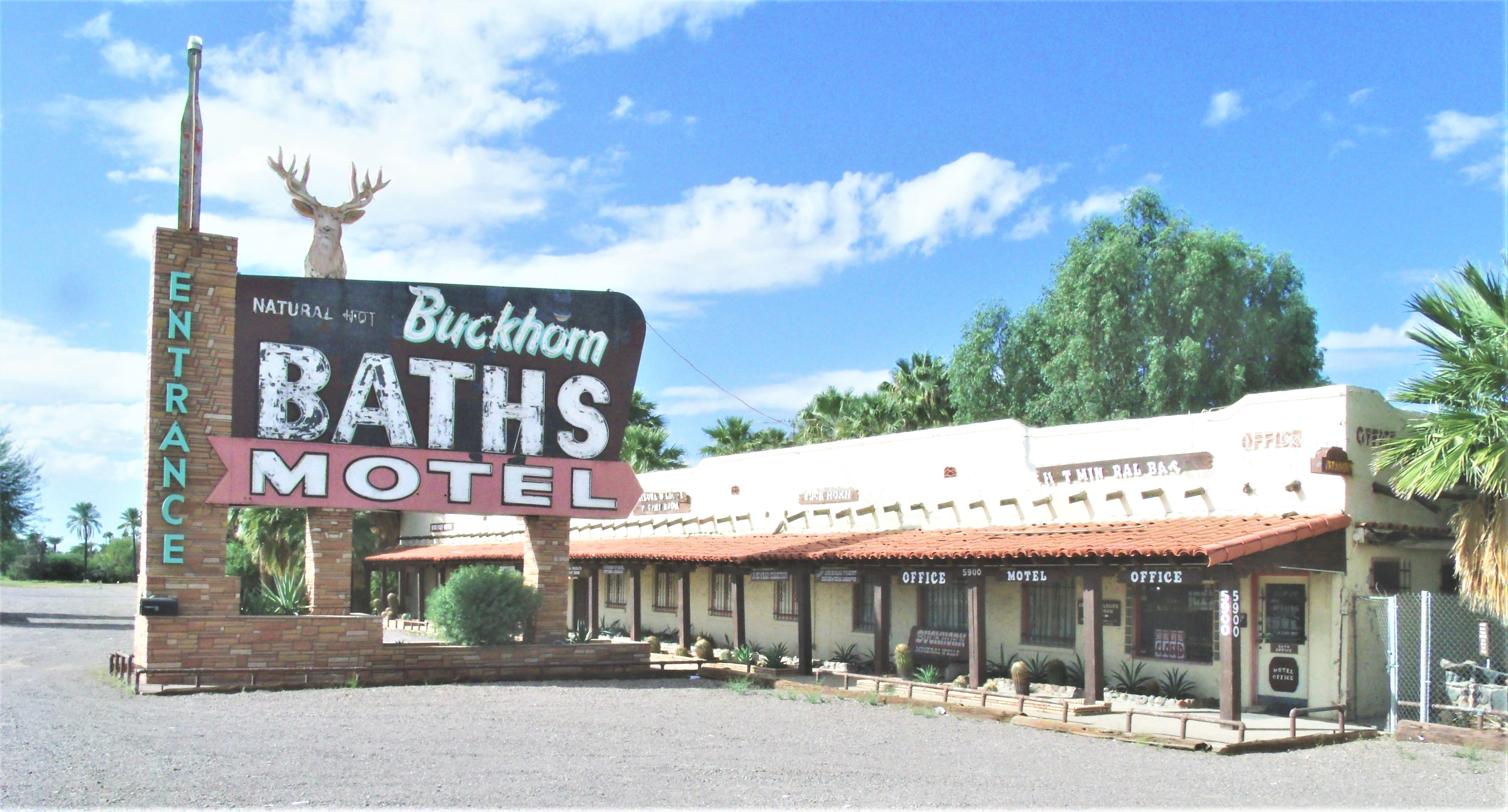
The motel's Main Street facade in 2014

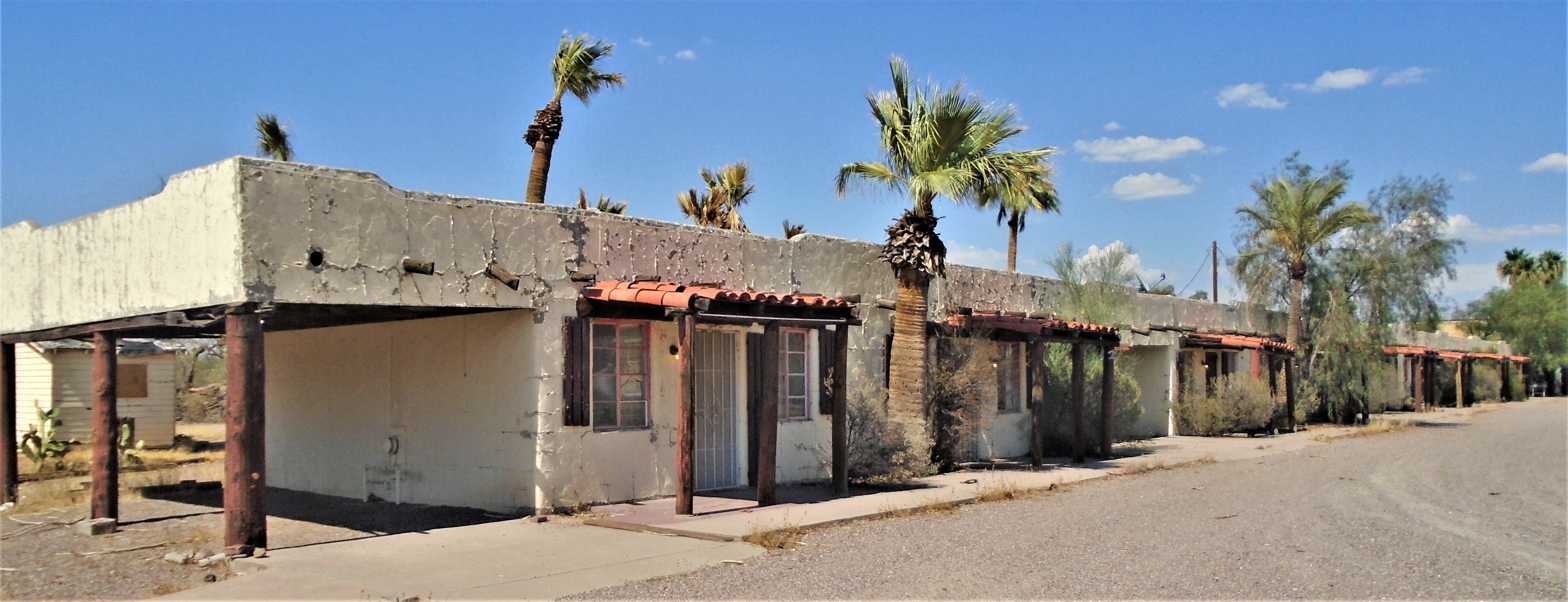
The motel building (2021)

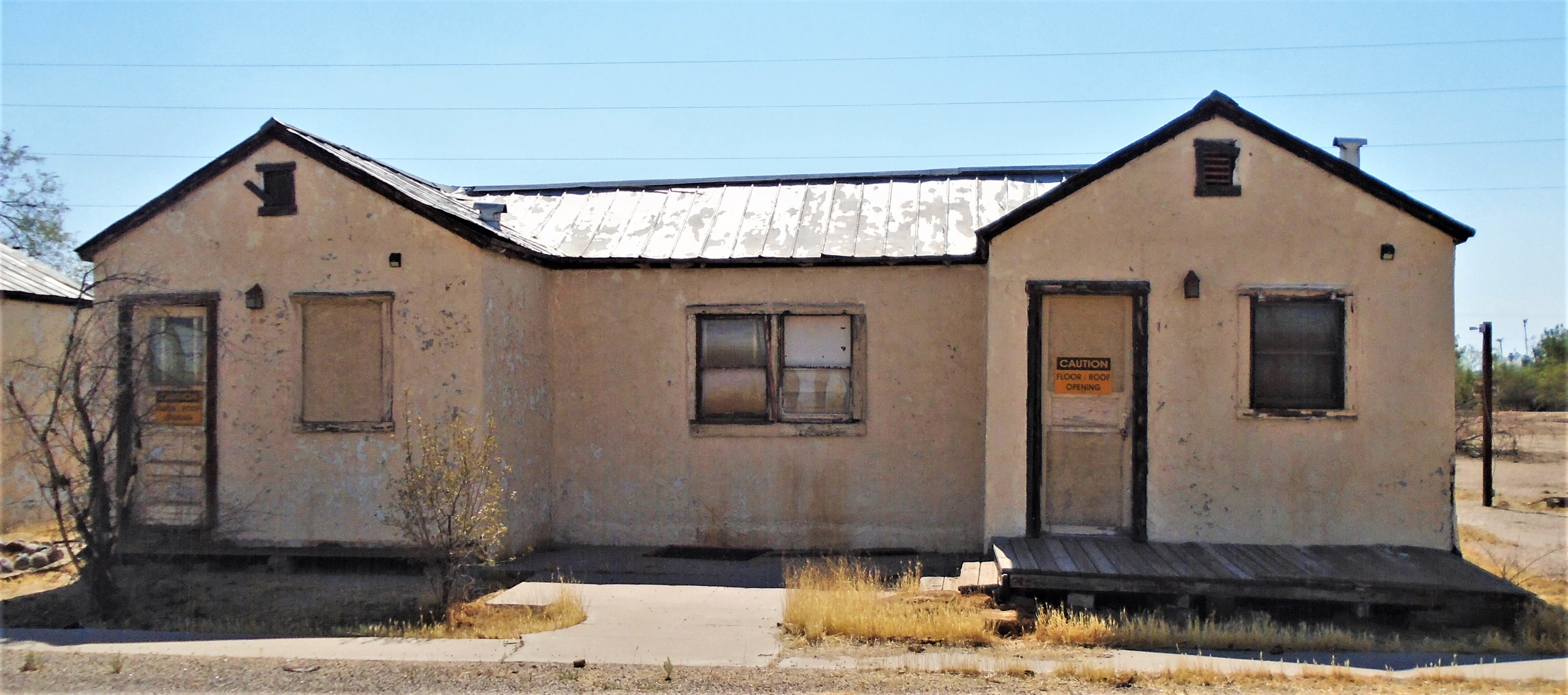
One of the resort's double cottages (2021)
