= Brezinaite =

Sulfide mineral

General
- Category: Sulfide mineral
- Formula: Cr_{3}S_{4}
- IMA symbol: Bzn
- Strunz classification: 2.DA.15
- Dana classification: 02.10.02.02
- Crystal system: Monoclinic
- Crystal class: Prismatic (2/m) (same H-M symbol)
- Space group: I2/m

Identification
- Color: Brownish gray, gray
- Mohs scale hardness: 3.5-4.5
- Luster: Metallic - dull
- Diaphaneity: Opaque
- Specific gravity: 4.12

Brezinaite, discovered in 1969, is a rare mineral composed of chromium and sulfur. It is found in meteorites, such as the Tucson Ring meteorite (Irwin-Ainsa meteorite), its type locality. It was also found in the New Baltimore meteorite and the Sikhote-Alin meteorite. Brezinaite was named in honour of Aristides Brezina (1848–1909), a past director of the Mineralogy-Petrology Section of the Natural History Museum, Vienna, Austria.
