= Arizona Museum of Natural History =

History museum in Maricopa County

Coordinates: 33.4167°N 111.8338°W

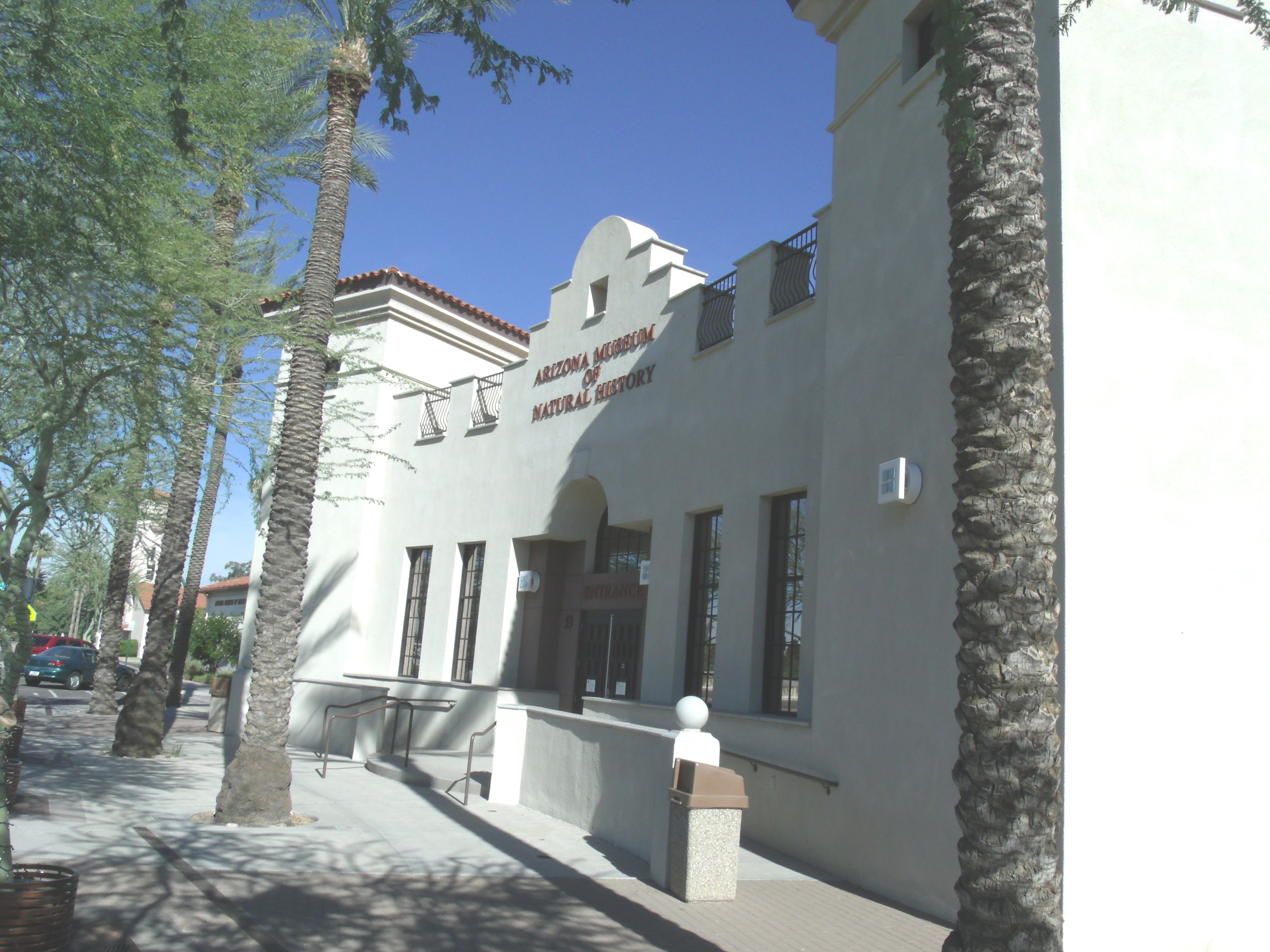
- Main entrance of the Arizona Museum of Natural History
- Established: 1977
- Location: Mesa, Arizona, United States
- Website: http://arizonamuseumofnaturalhistory.org/

The Arizona Museum of Natural History (originally the Mesa Southwest Museum) located in Mesa, Arizona, is the only natural history museum in the greater Phoenix area. It exhibits the natural and cultural history of the Southwestern United States.

== History ==
The Mesa Southwest Museum was founded as a small museum in Mesa City Hall in 1977 with a small collection of Arizona artifacts, in a building designed by Lescher & Mahoney built in 1937 with WPA funds, that housed the city hall, municipal courts, city library, police and fire departments. The building was expanded in 1983 and 1987, and in 2000 a new wing was added. The main museum complex is about 74,000 square feet (6,900 m^{2}), of which about 46,000 square feet (4,300 m^{2}) are dedicated to exhibitions containing a collection of 60,000 objects of natural history, anthropology, history & art, including 10,000 historic photographs. A research facility was added in 1995 with research curators in the fields of paleontology and archeology/anthropology.

The museum was renamed the Arizona Museum of Natural History in 2007. Recent annual attendance is about 139,998.

== Exhibitions ==
The museum has a three-story indoor waterfall on Dinosaur Mountain, which features animatronic dinosaurs and a flash flood display that runs every 30 minutes. Other exhibitions include Dinosaur Hall, a real territorial jail, and a recreation of the Lost Dutchman's Gold Mine. The Southwest Gallery consists of a native peoples’ gallery, with exhibits about Paleoindian big game hunters and gatherers, the first inhabitants of North America, and the desert cultures that developed later. It also holds a re-creation of a Hohokam village, with pithouses and above-ground structures, outfitted with real artifacts as they might have been from A.D. 600–1450. Another exhibit is the Ancient Cultures of Mexico. The Origins gallery is designed as a voyage through the timeline of the cosmos and discusses major events in the history of planet Earth.

Among the exhibitions is a hands-on Exploration Station and the Paleo Dig Pit.

Three temporary galleries offer a variety of subjects. The evolution of flight—was it from the ground-up or from the tree down? AzMNH's exhibition, "Rulers of the Prehistoric Skies," helped to answer that question. That exhibit has since been replaced, but the pterosaurs are still visible throughout the museum.

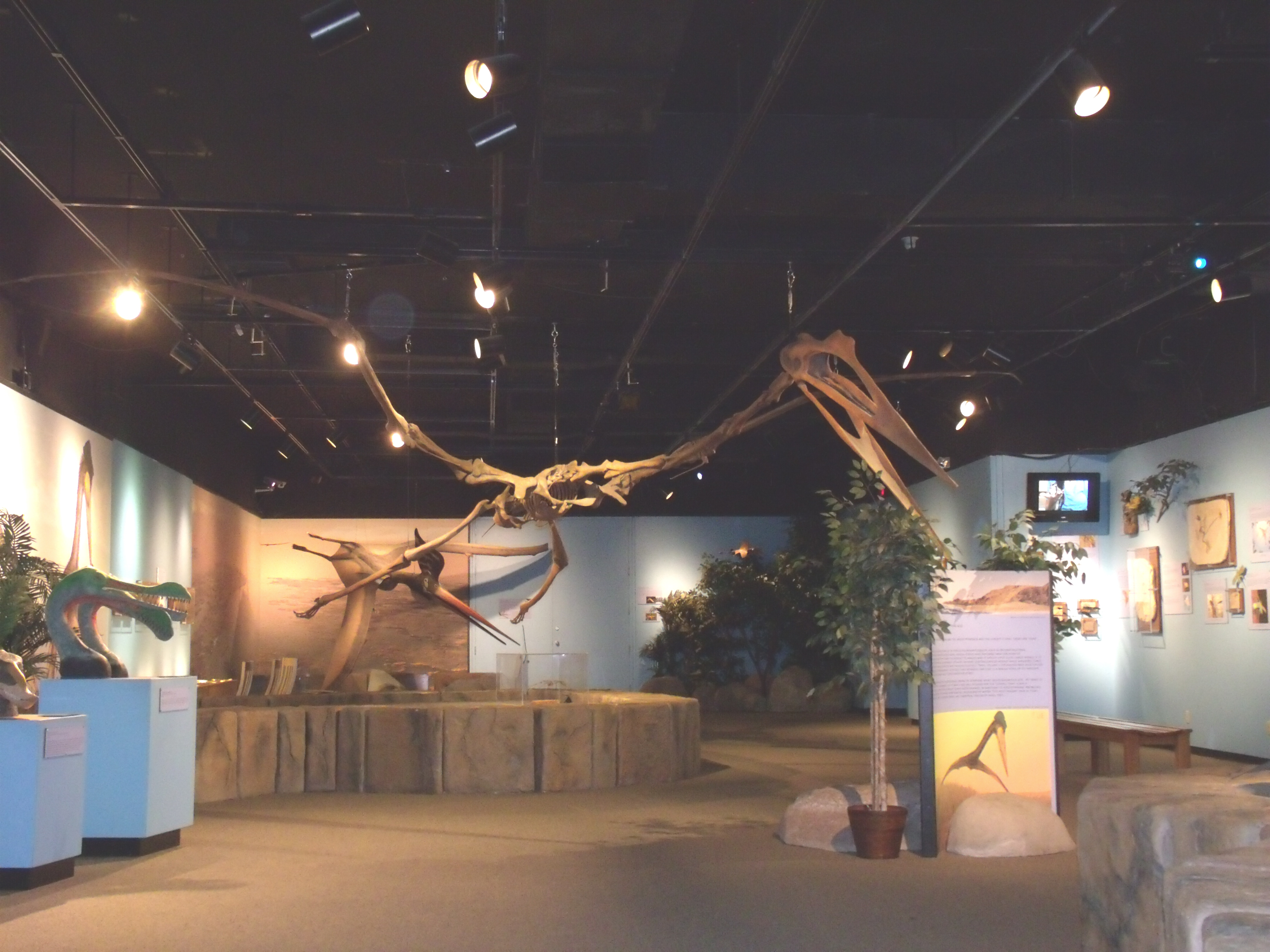
The skeleton of a pterosaur on display in the museum.

At no other time in the history of life on Earth were there animals like the pterosaurs, those flying creatures who truly did rule the sky. They were the first vertebrates to achieve flight, and they did it in a way that was all their own. In addition to very distinctly shaped, thin, hollow bones, pterosaurs had membranous wings which were probably flexible and able to change shape during flight. The mechanical details are not completely understood by paleontologists, who share multiple opinions.

The goal of the exhibit was to have visitors understand the amazing diversity among pterosaurs. Exhibit volunteers helped to achieve this goal by building everything from “rock blocks” and puzzles, to actual models of the fliers themselves. Don Puffer created a 4-foot mechanical pterosaur known as “Clam Digger” that demonstrated the opening and closing of its wings. Ed Mack's sculpture Pteranodon sternbergi is a stunning life-size model that hangs over Dinosaur Mountain.

"Rulers of the Prehistoric Skies" was part of a Mesa Arts and Culture First Flight initiative and focused on flying reptiles; the exhibit also explored the evolution of flight from insects, the true first flyers, to birds and bats.

The "Rulers of the Prehistoric Skies" exhibit opened on February 4, 2012, and was on display for approximately four years due to its popularity.

Another of the changing exhibits was "The Primal Desert Next Door: Land of Black Volcanoes and White Sands," open from February 26, 2011, until January 2013. Much of the Sonoran Desert lies south of the Arizona border in Mexico. This vast expanse and its diverse wildlife was the focus of this exhibition, which included wall murals depicting the vast contrasting dark “moon-scape” volcanic fields and bright seas of sand dunes. Visitors were able to learn about the geology, flora, and fauna of this region though photographs and interactive components. The exhibition was based on the book Land of Black Volcanoes and White Sands, The Pinacate and Gran Desierto De Altar Biosphere Reserve, by Larry Marshall and Clark Blake. Interactive features included a dune machine, which replicated the phenomena of sand dunes, a hands-on basin and range topography display, and a mock lava tube, which children could climb through. This exhibition has since been replaced. All exhibitions are described at http://www.azmnh.org

AzMNH exhibitions are funded mostly by private donations to the Arizona Museum of Natural History Foundation, the Museum's 501(c)(3) nonprofit organization.

The museum also maintains the Sirrine House, a Queen Anne style home built in Mesa in 1896. The museum says that the home is the only fully restored Victorian-era home museum. The Sirrine House is open only for special events.

== Paleontology ==
The Paleontology Section, which is the study of past life, is the primary emphasis of the Natural History Section of the Arizona Museum of Natural History. The Natural History Section explores, excavates, records, prepares, conserves, and researches the fossil resources in the collection at AzMNH. In addition to working with state, university, and municipal agencies, AzMNH is an official repository for specimens collected from State, Bureau of Land Management (BLM), National Forest, and Fish and Wildlife lands throughout Arizona.

The Dinosaur Hall features an unnamed coelurosaur nicknamed the "Zuni coelurosaur", a Tarbosaurus skeleton and a Tyrannosaurus rex skull. Also they feature a Gastornis. As sauropods they have a Camarasaurus skeleton and an Apatosaurus femur. As ceratopsians they have a Psittacosaurus skeleton, a Zuniceratops, Protoceratops, Pentaceratops and Triceratops and as iguanodonts they consist solely on a Probactrosaurus.

== Archeology/Anthropology ==
The Anthropology Section of the Arizona Museum of Natural History conducts research and develops exhibitions on Native American cultures and the archaeology of southern Arizona. Archaeology has been a major focus of the museum since its inception in 1977. The museum sponsors ongoing excavation at the Mesa Grande Ruin, a large mound in Mesa dating from the Hohokam Classic Period. This is one of the most important tasks of the anthropology department. The opening of Mesa Grande as a heritage site dedicated to public education concerning the Hohokam and O'odham people remains a central goal of the museum.

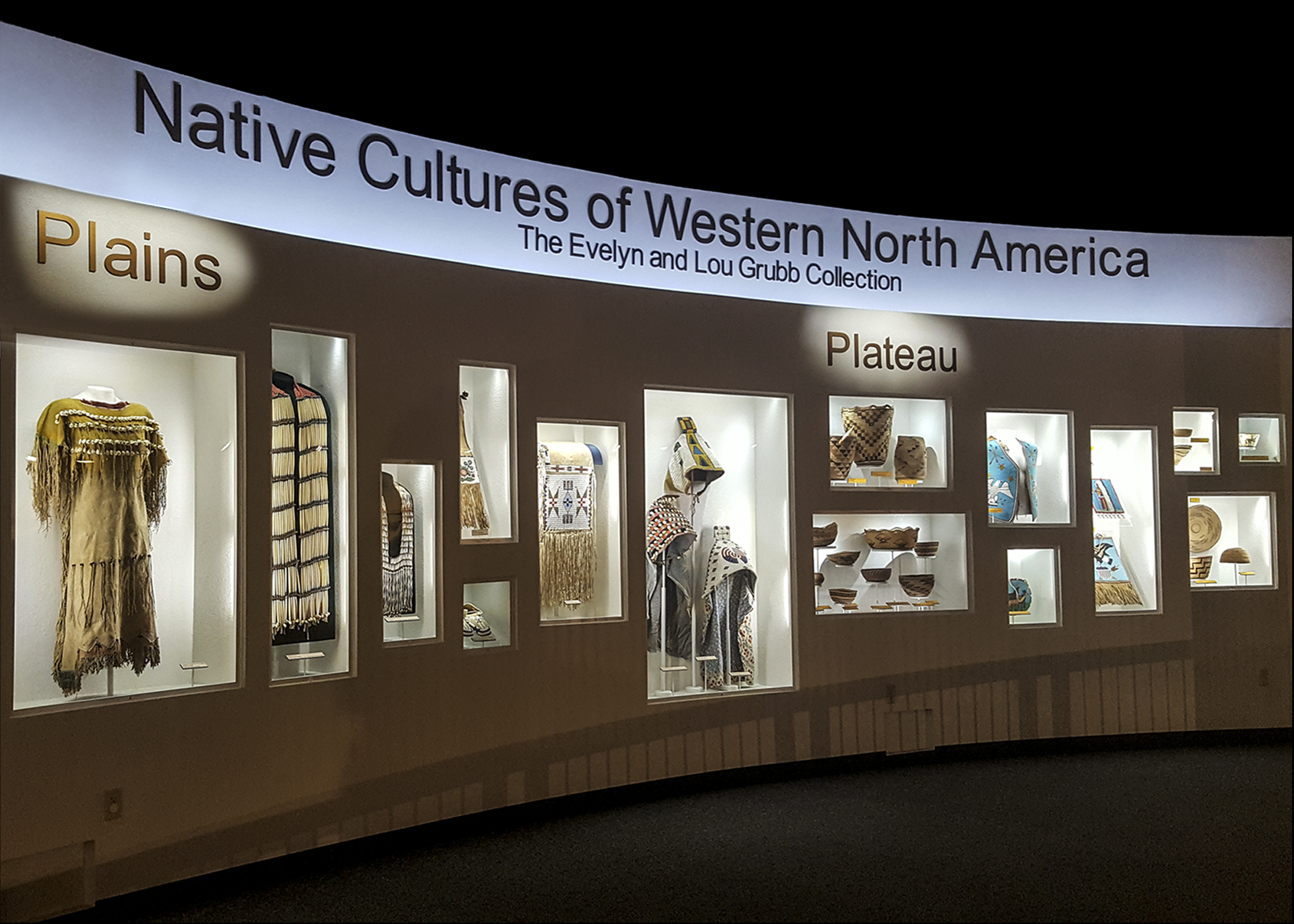
The Evelyn and Lou Grubb Collection. Native Cultures of Western North America explores the lifeways of dozens of Native American peoples from the Mississippi River to the Pacific Ocean, from Alaska to Mexico.

== Exhibits ==
Here are of some of the exhibits in the museum:

Exhibits in the Arizona Museum of Natural History

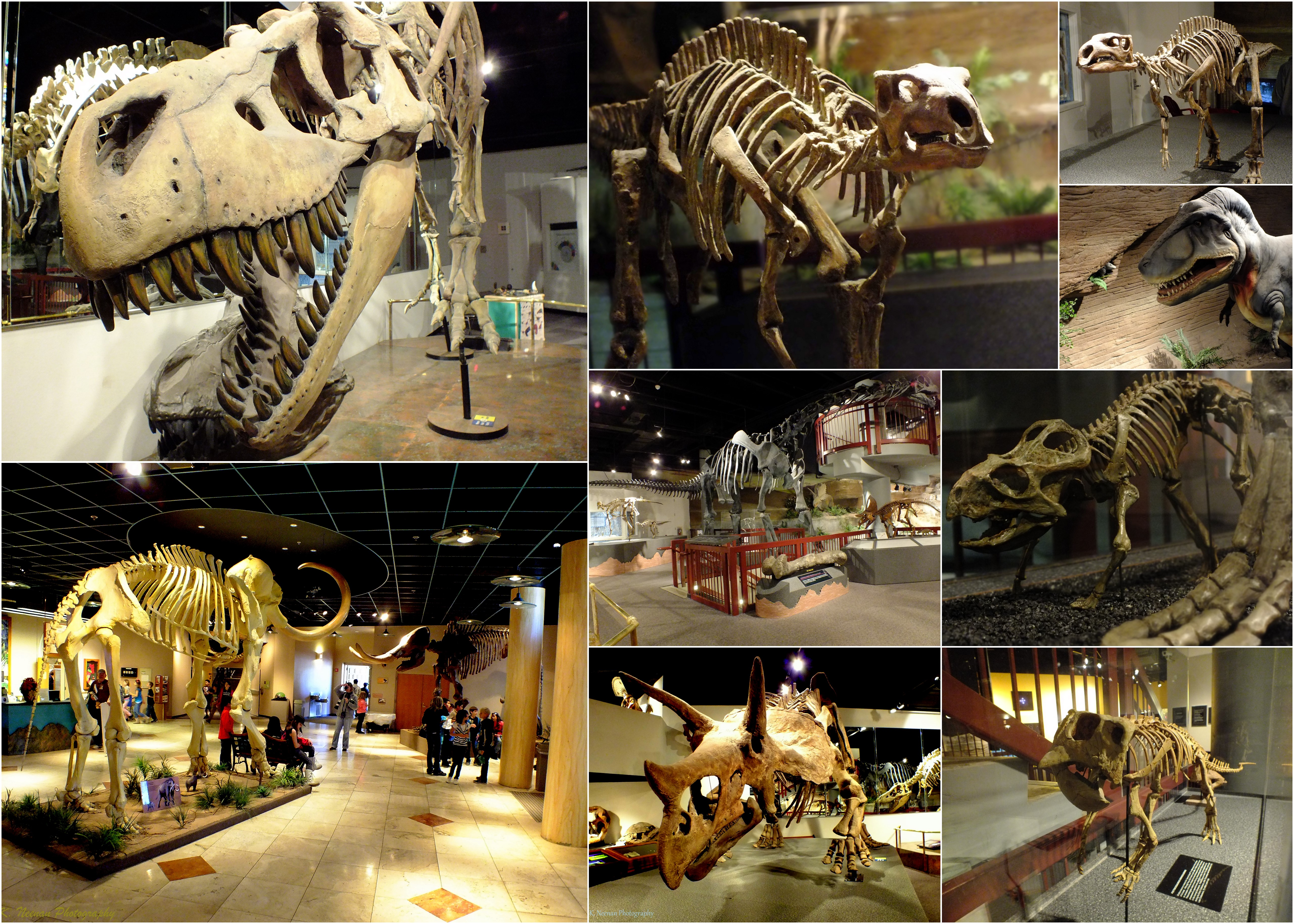
Collage of some of the many fossils on display

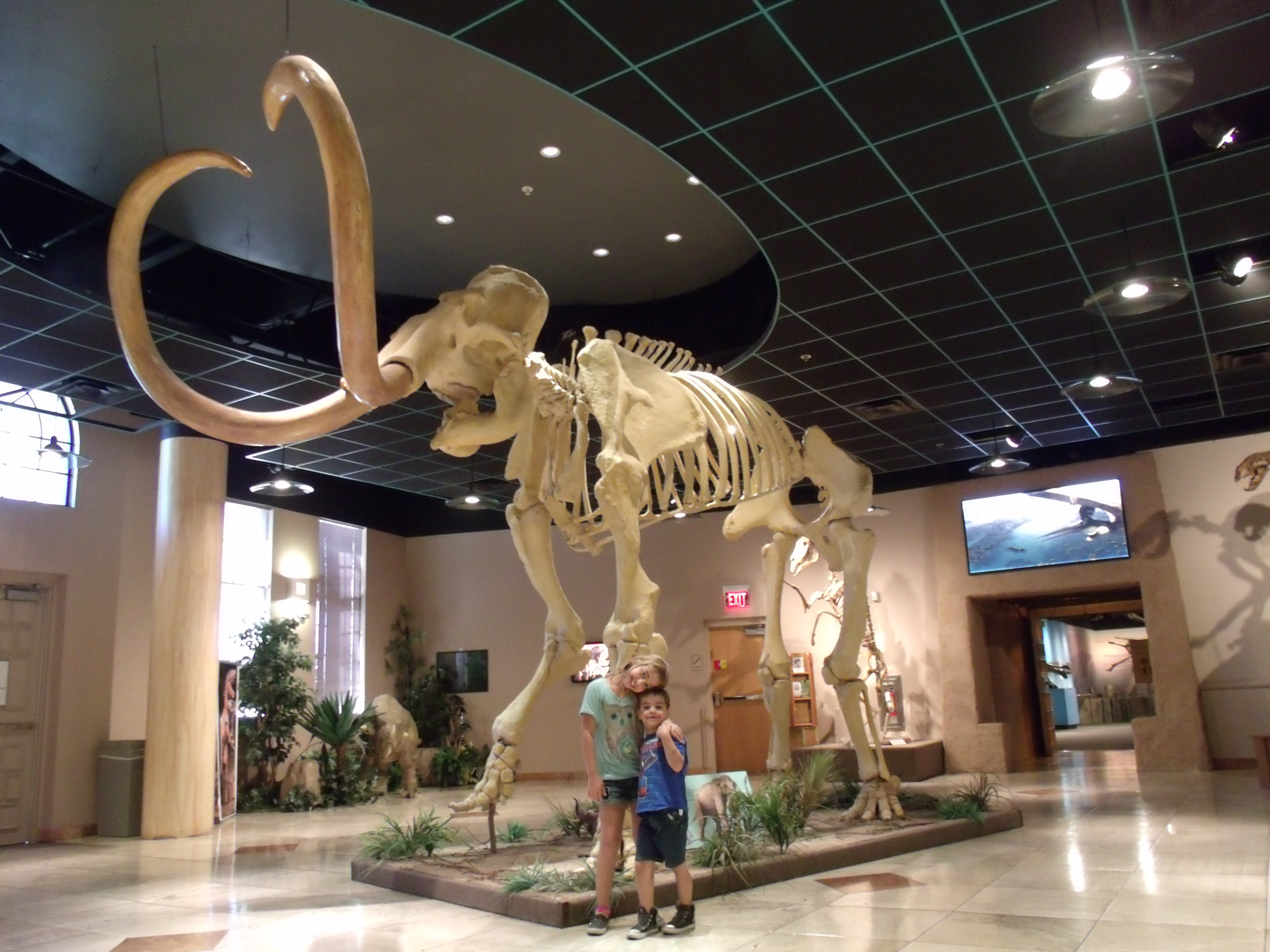
Children posing in front of the skeleton of a Columbian Mammoth in the museum’s lobby.

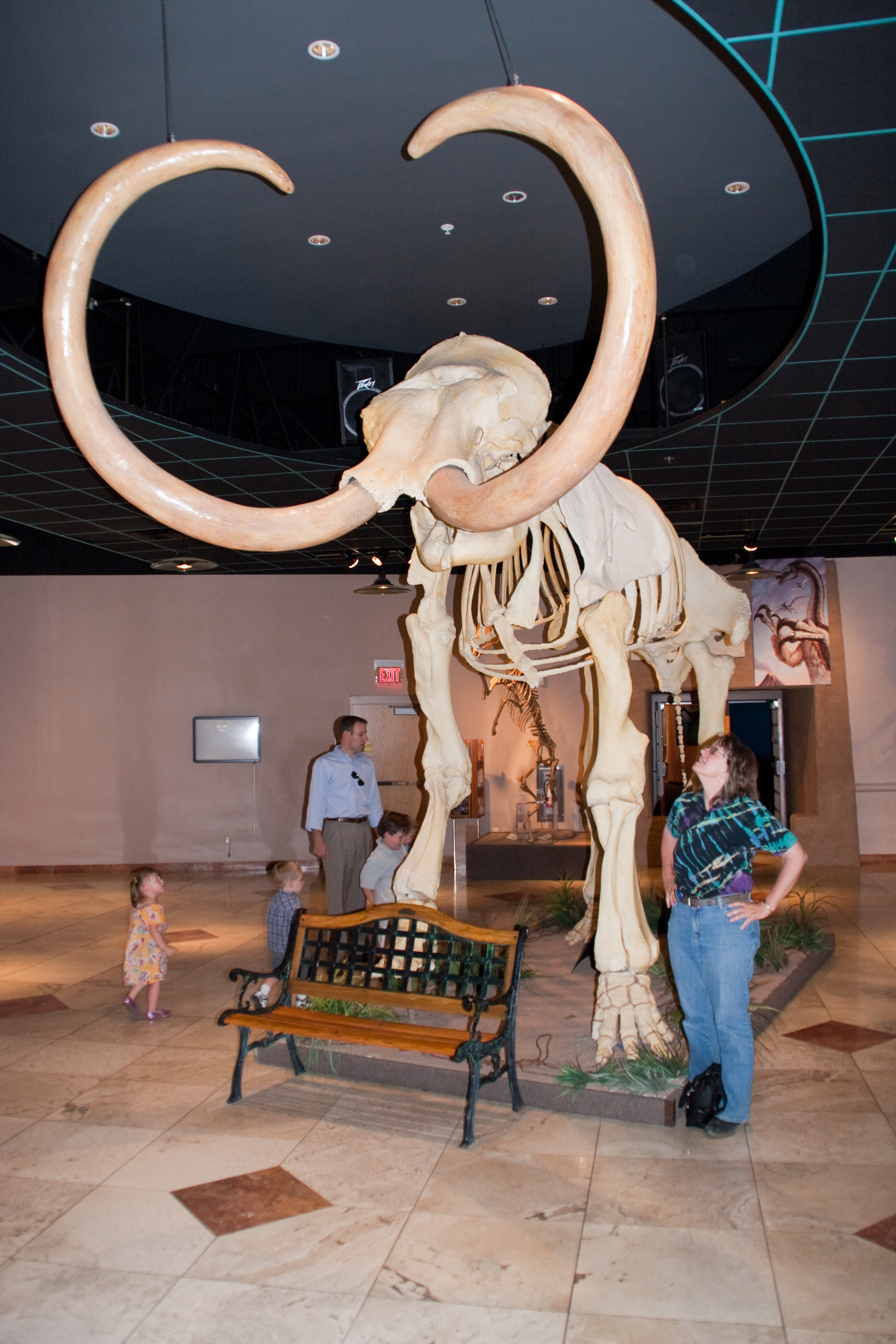
Another view of the Columbian Mammoth in the museum’s lobby.

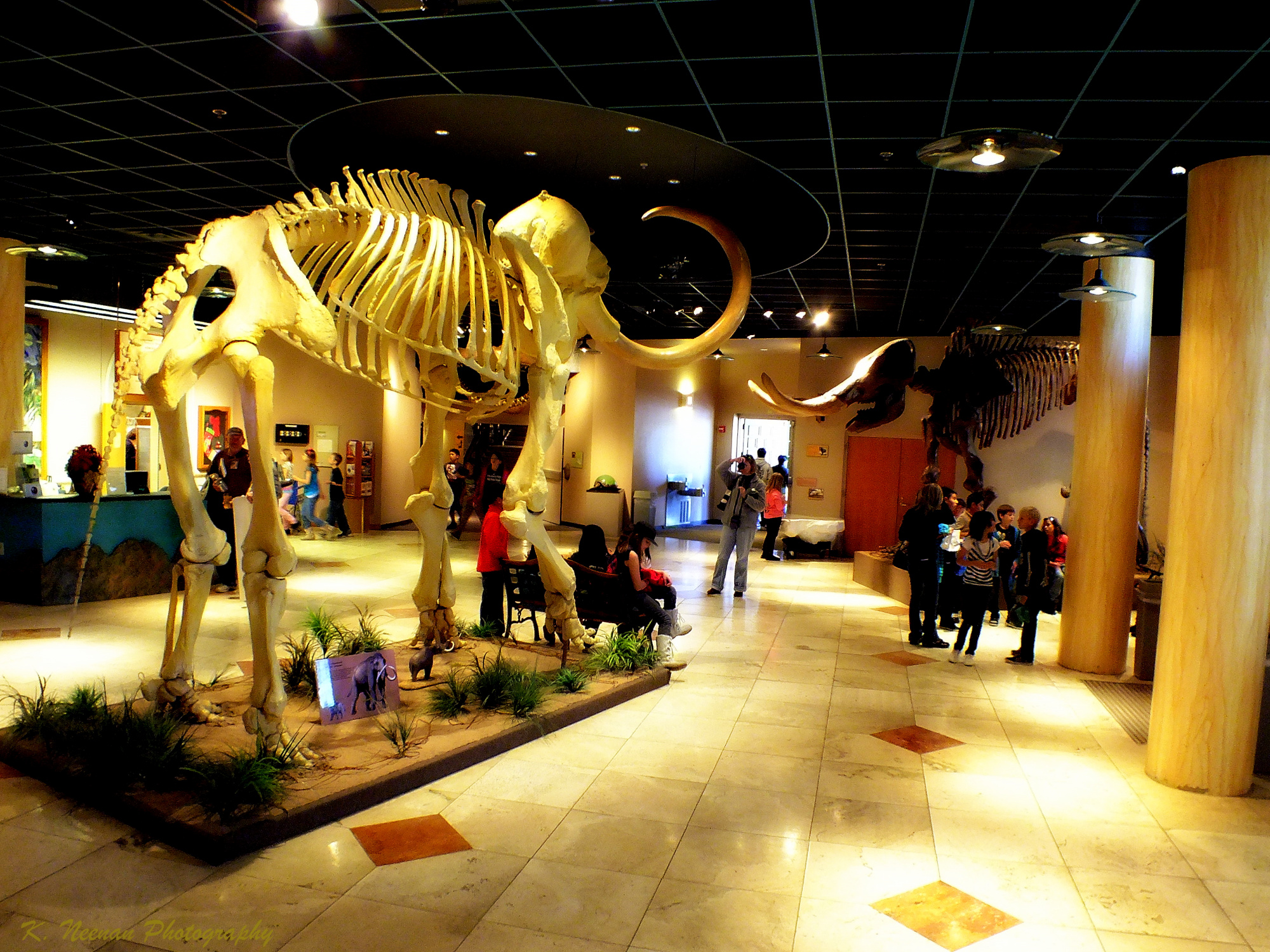
Arizona Museum of Natural History Lobby.

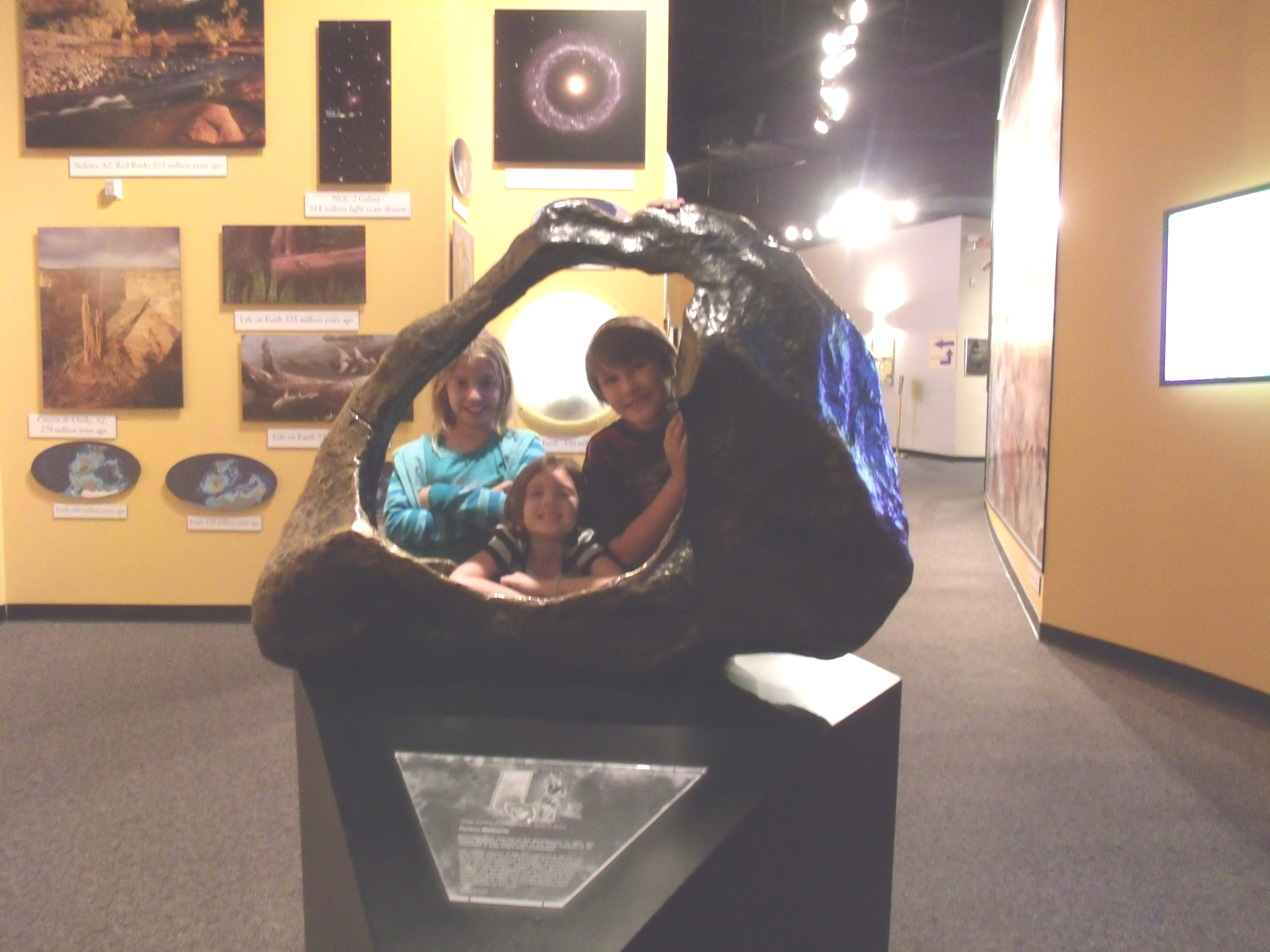
Children posing behind a replica of the Tucson Meteorite on exhibit in the “Origins Hall”.

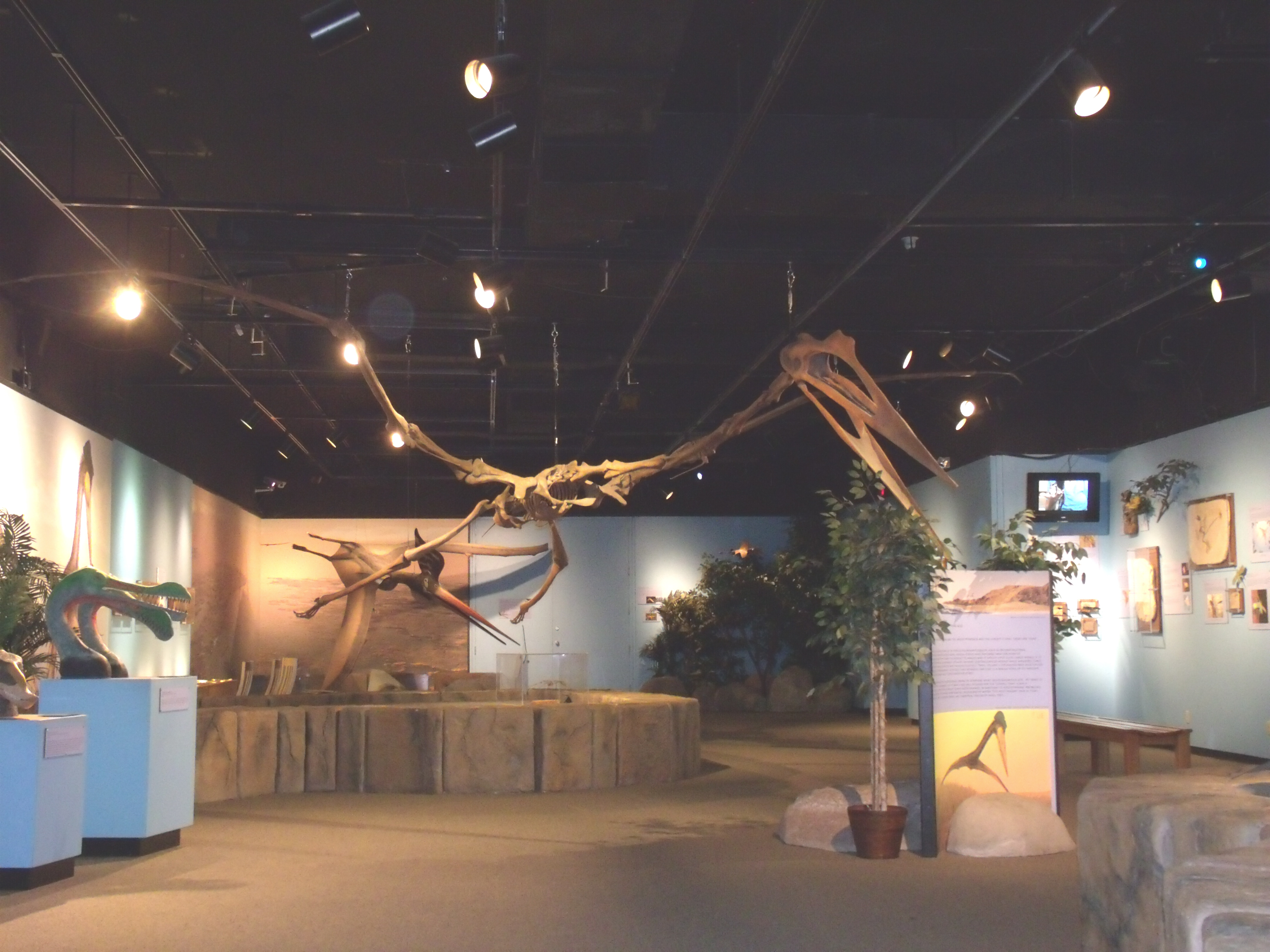
The skeleton of a Pterosaur on display in the Arizona Museum of Natural History in Mesa Arizona.

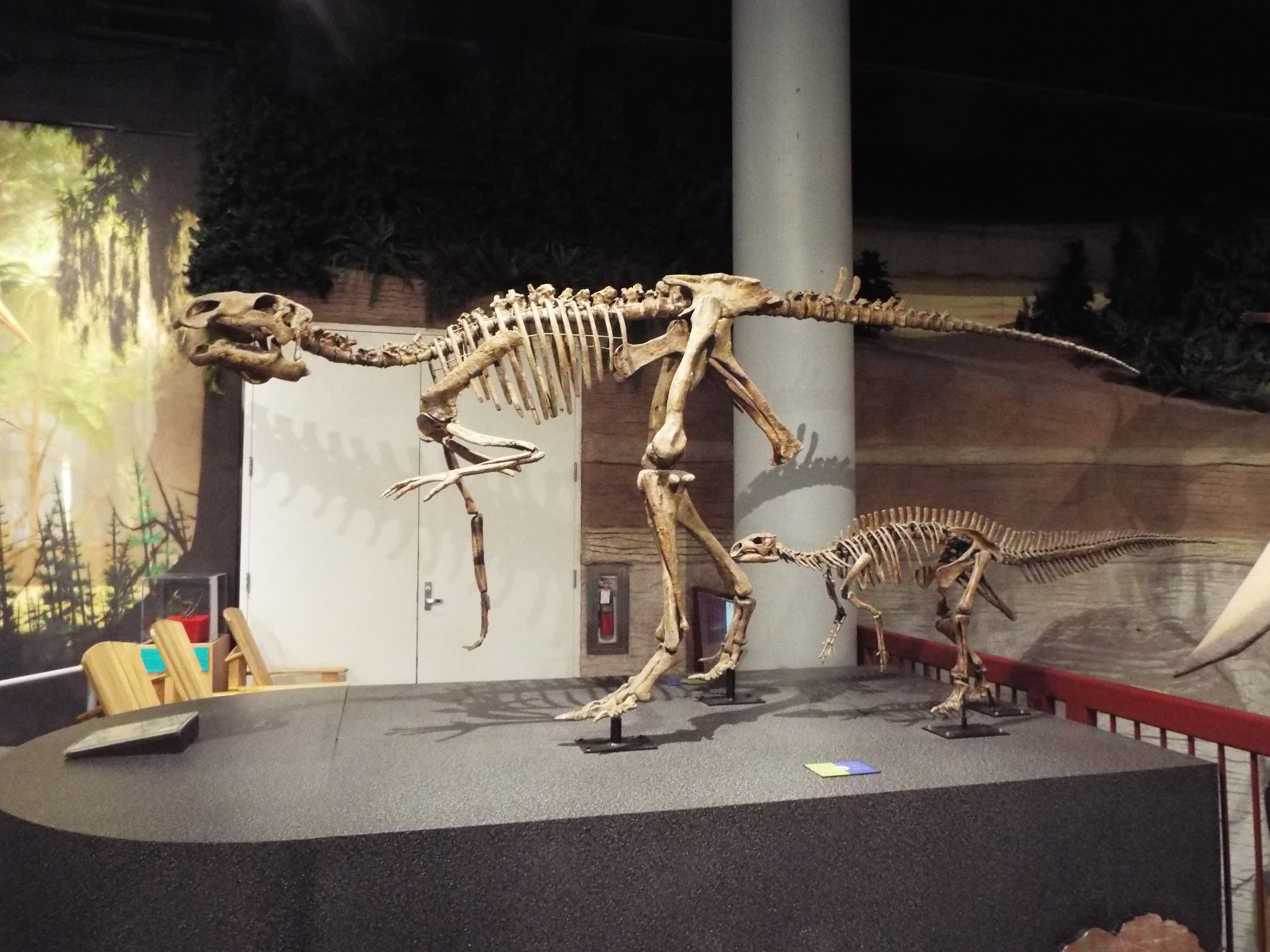
An adult and baby Probactrosaurus.

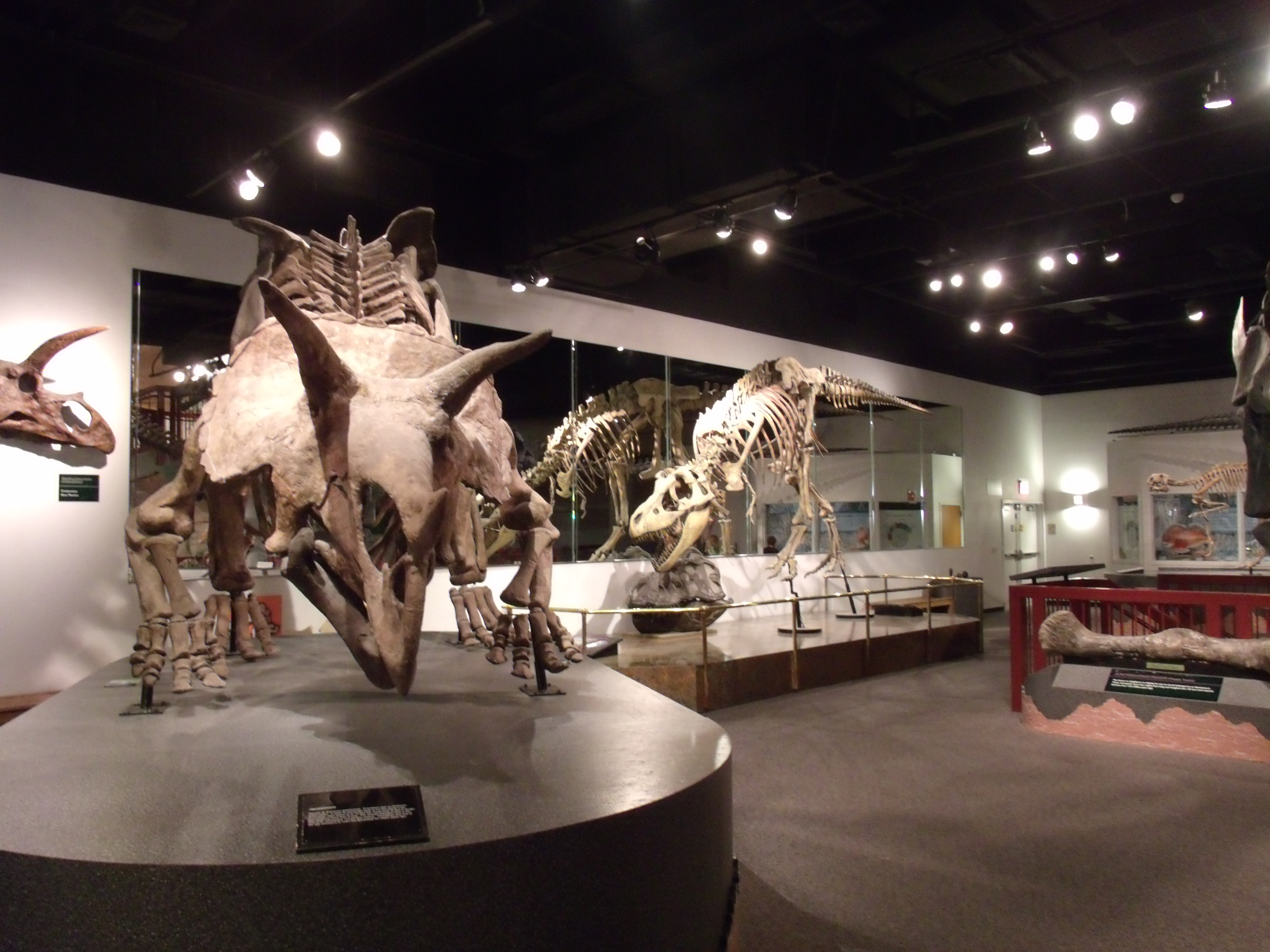
Partial Dinosaur Hall display.

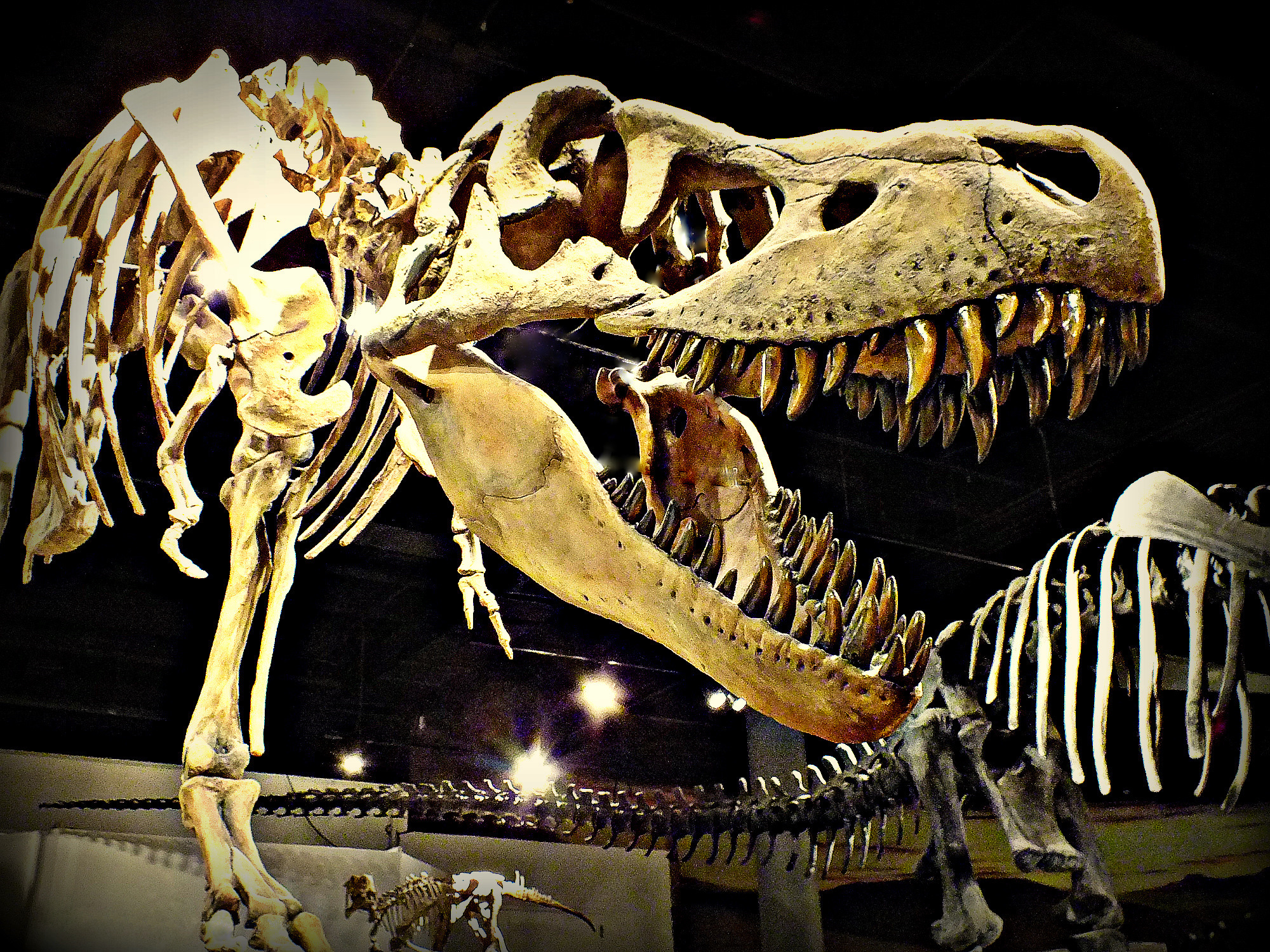
Tarbosaurus aka Tyrannosaurus Bataar located in “Dinosaur Hall”.

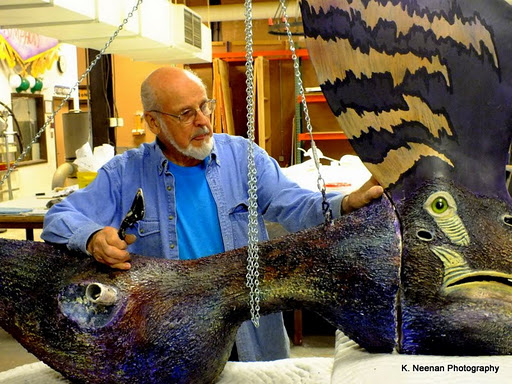
Artist Ed Mack working on his Pteranodon sternbergi.

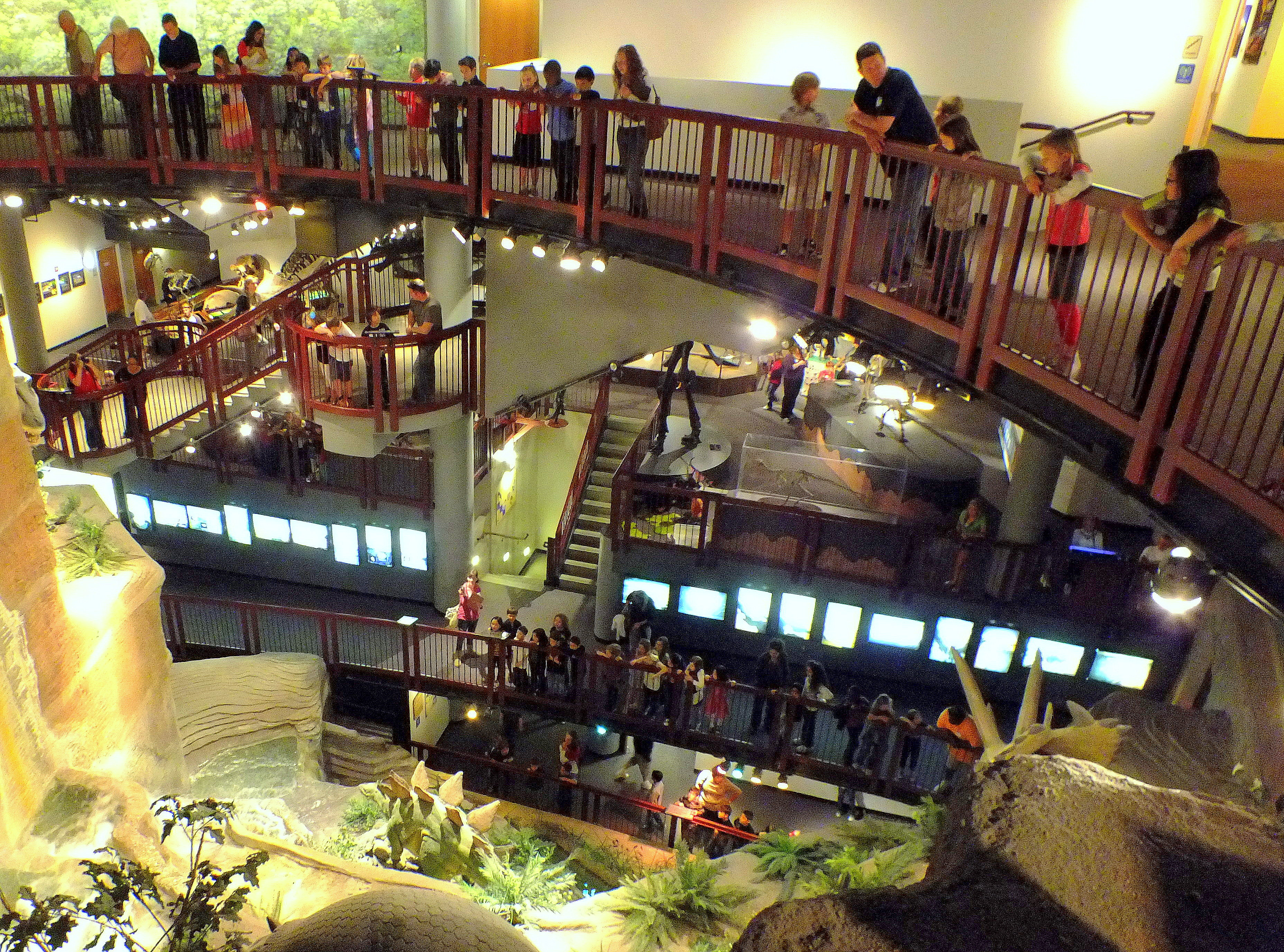
This shows all 3 levels of the museum waiting to be explored.

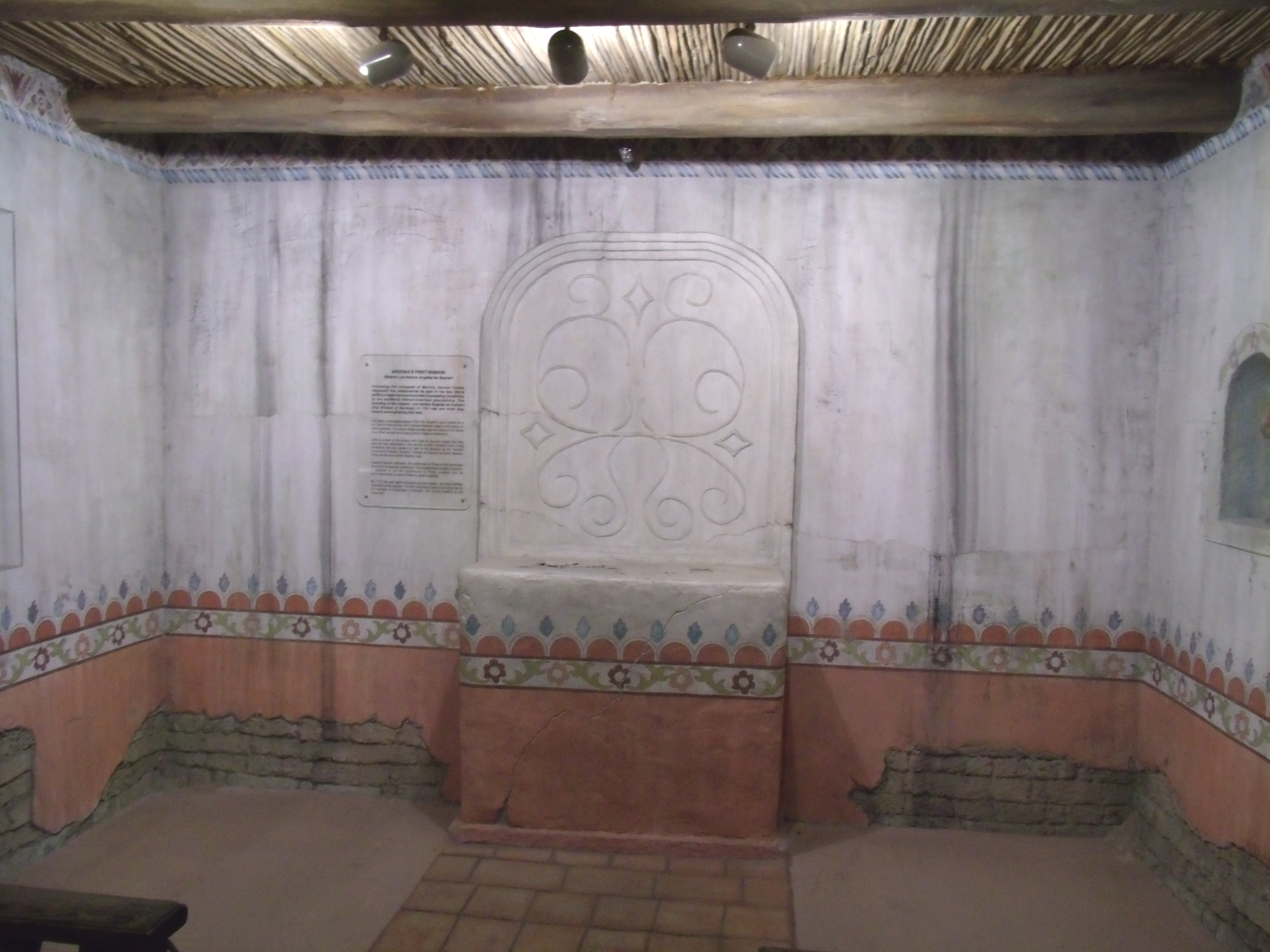
Arizona's First Mission exhibit.

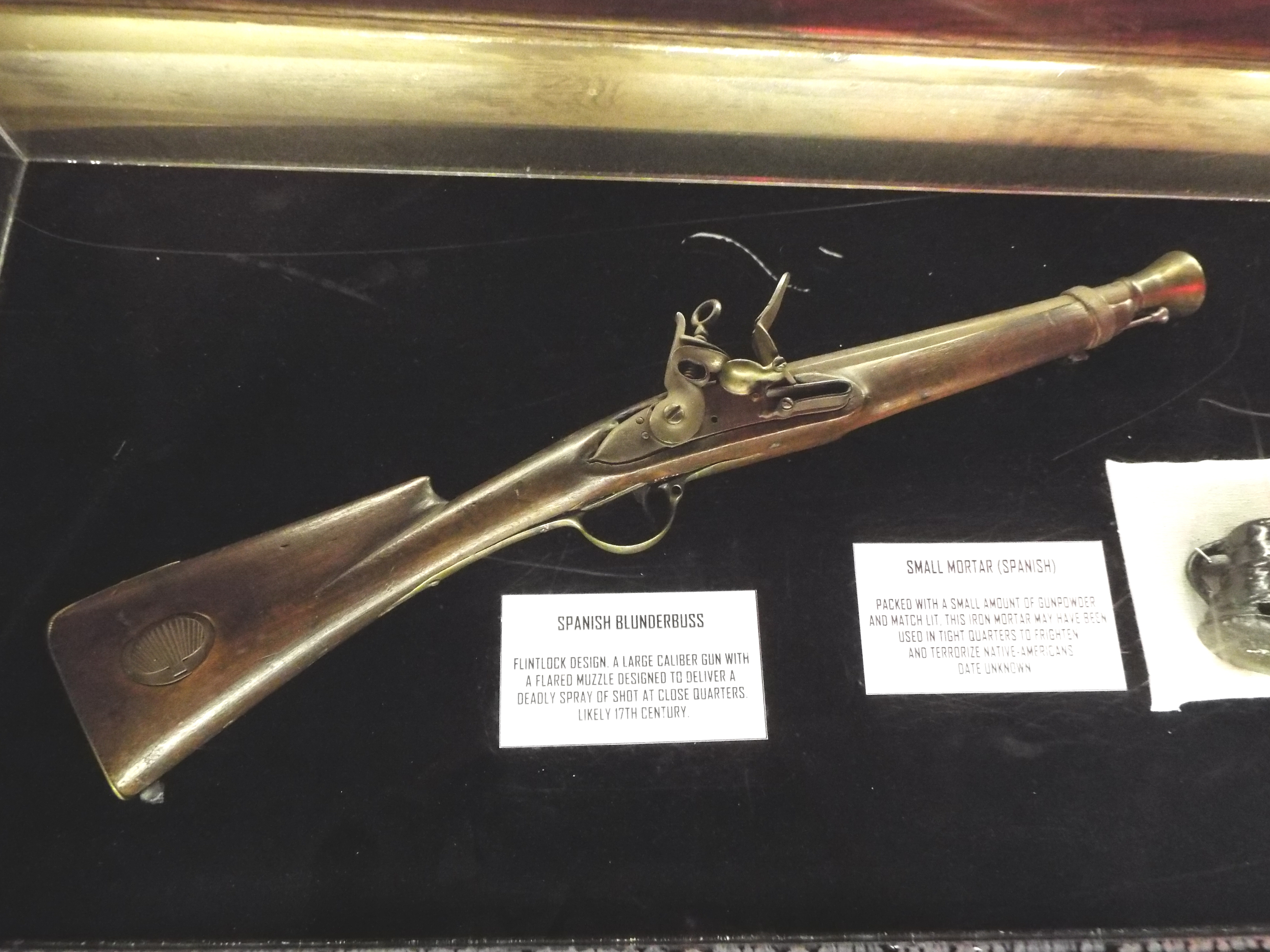
17 Century Spanish Blunderbuss.

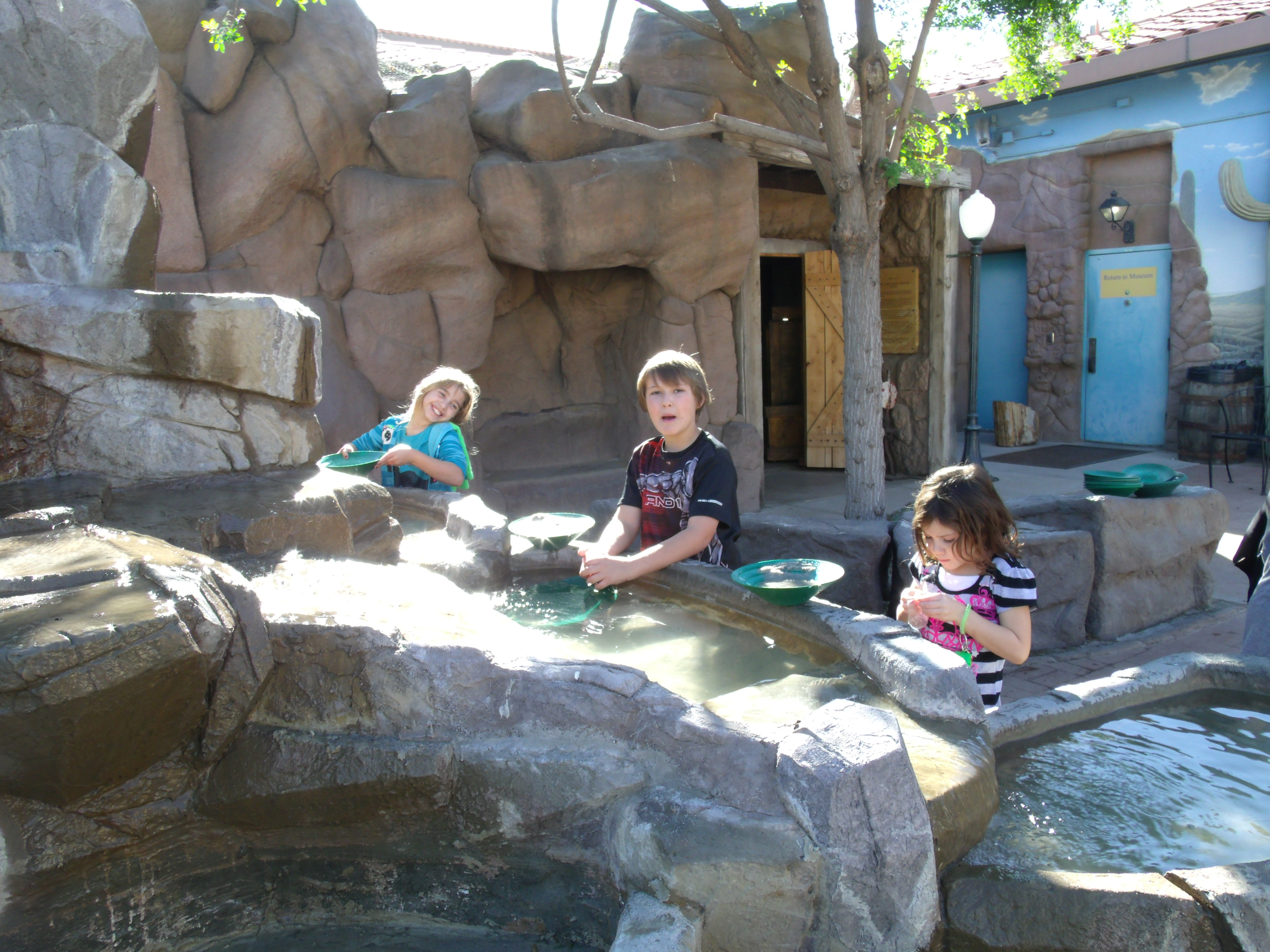
Children in the interactive gold panning exhibit.

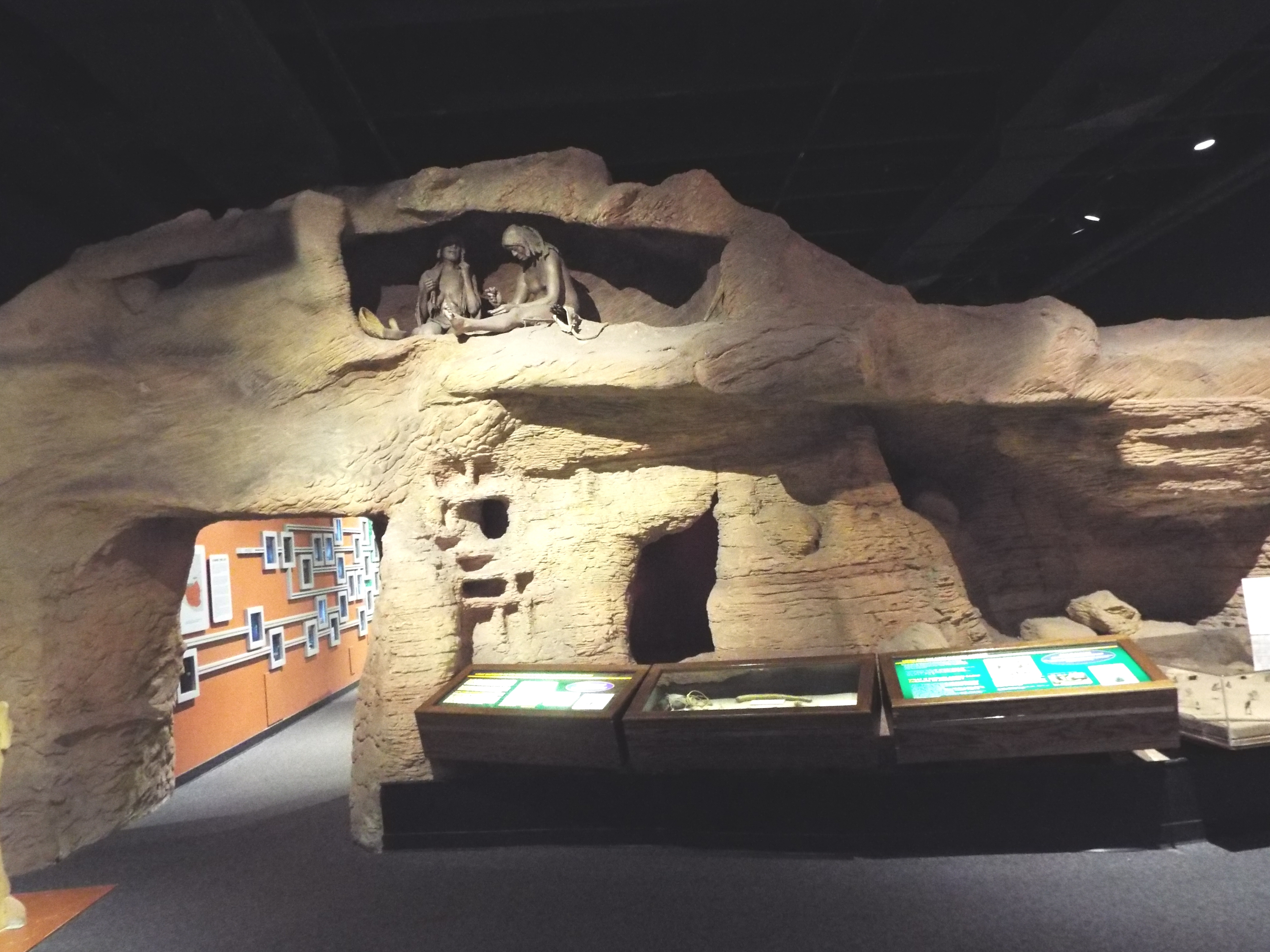
Arizona Native-American exhibit.
