= Tucson Ring meteorite =

Iron meteorite found in Arizona, United States

Tucson Ring
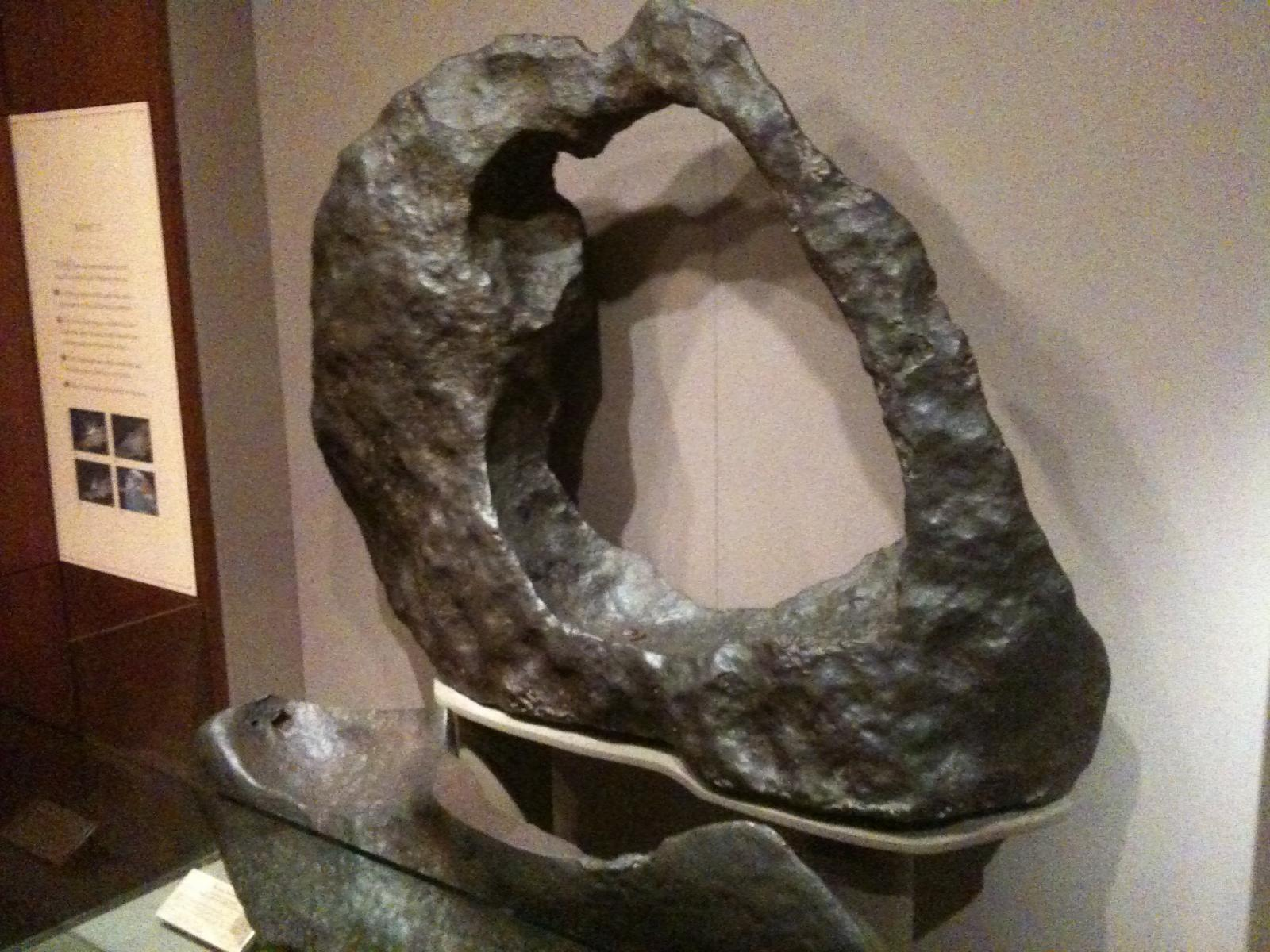
- The Tucson Ring meteorite on display at the Smithsonian Museum of Natural History
- Type: Iron
- Class: Iron, ungrouped
- Country: United States
- Region: Arizona
- Coordinates: 31°51′N 110°58′W
- Observed fall: No
- Found date: 1850
- TKW: 975 kg
- Related media on Wikimedia Commons

The Tucson Ring meteorite is a brezinaite meteorite fragment, first described by Bunch and Fuchs. It was reported as one of several masses of virgin iron found at the foot of the Sierra de la Madera and transported to the plaza of Tucson, Arizona circa 1850, where it was used as an anvil in a blacksmith's shop.

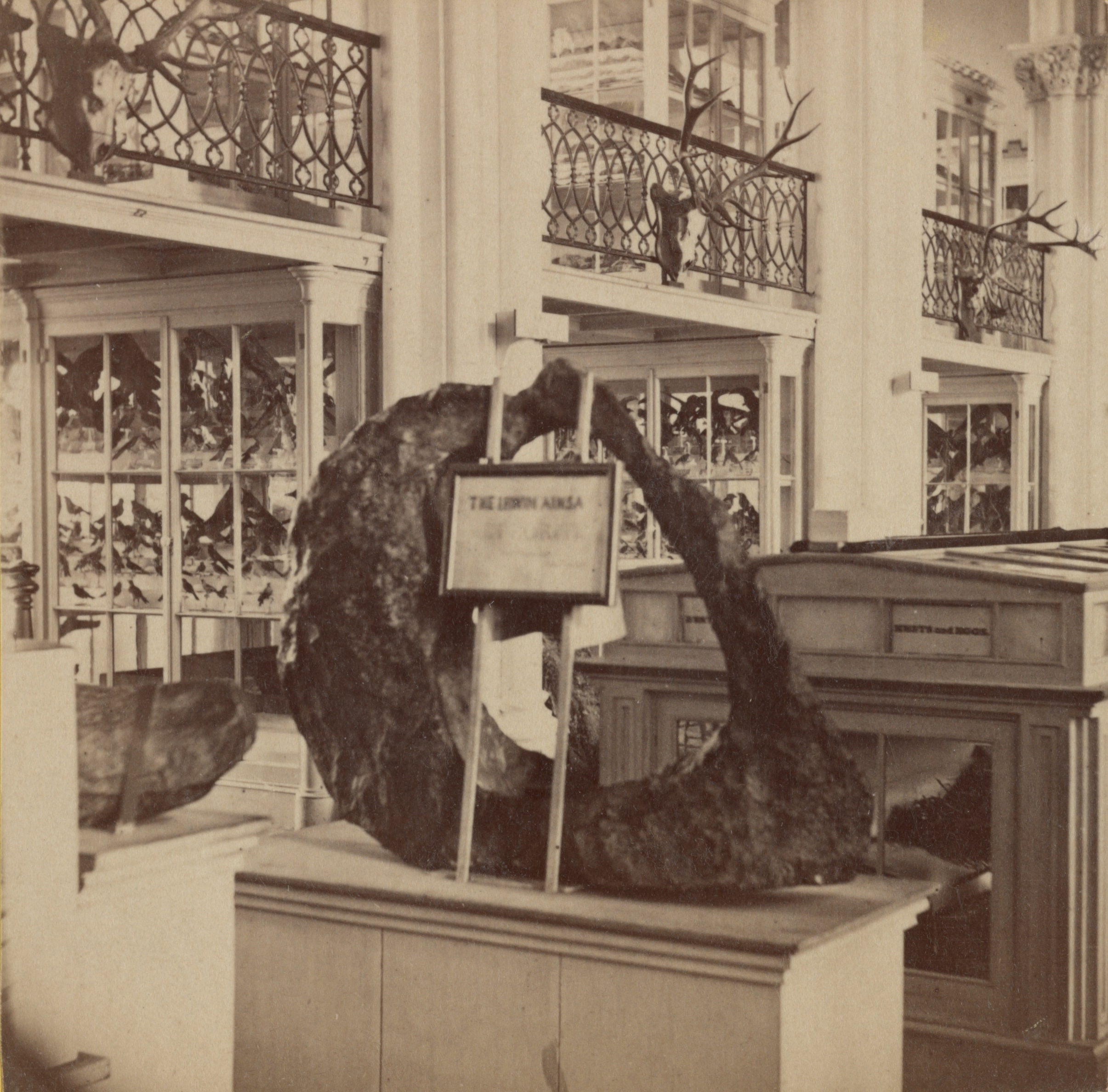
The meteorite on display in the Smithsonian Institution Building, 1867.
