= City of Mesa Cemetery =

Historic cemetery in Maricopa County, Arizona

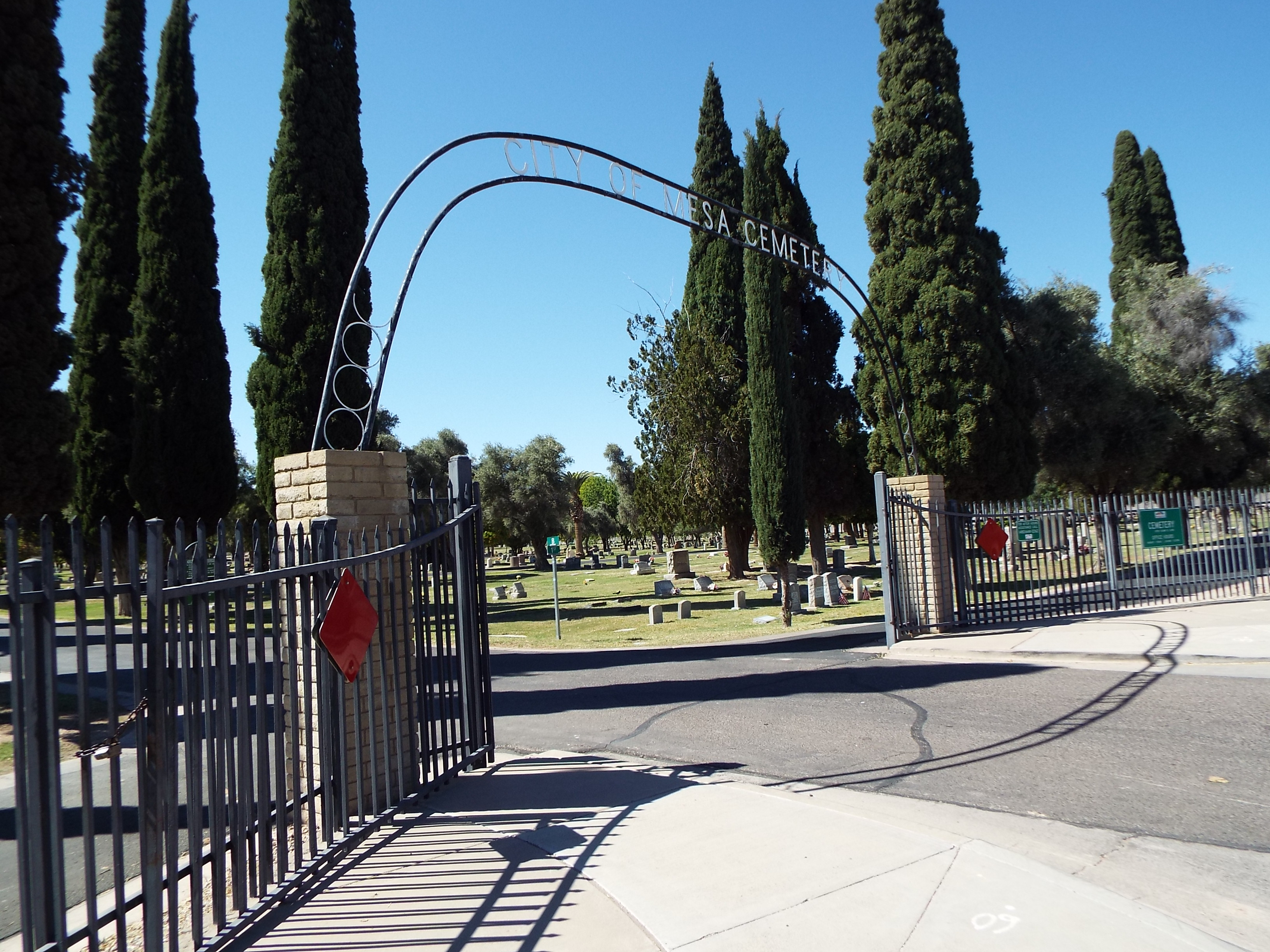
- City of Mesa Cemetery entrance
- Interactive map of City of Mesa Cemetery

Details
- Established: 1891
- Location: 1212 N. Center Street
- Country: U.S.
- Coordinates: 33°26′19″N 111°50′08″W
- Owned by: City of Mesa
- No. of interments: >42,000
- Website: https://www.mesaaz.gov/residents/mesa-cemetery
- Find a Grave: City of Mesa Cemetery

The City of Mesa Cemetery is a historic cemetery located at 1212 N. Center Street in the city of Mesa, Arizona. It is the final resting place of various notable early citizens of Mesa. Among those who are interred in the cemetery are early pioneers, mayors, businessman, criminals and veterans of the United States Armed Forces.

== History ==
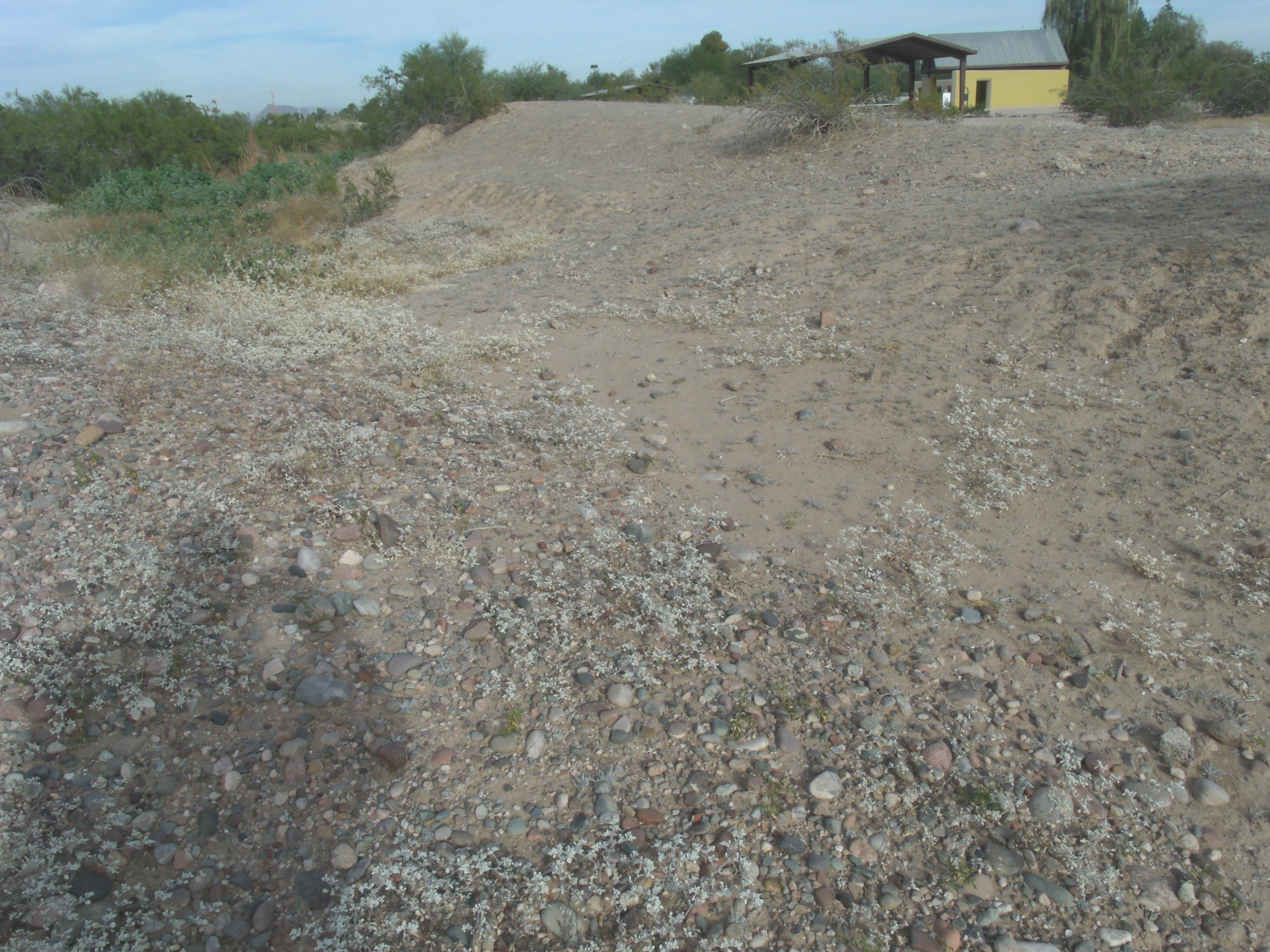
This is a prehistoric canal built by the Hohokam in Mesa.

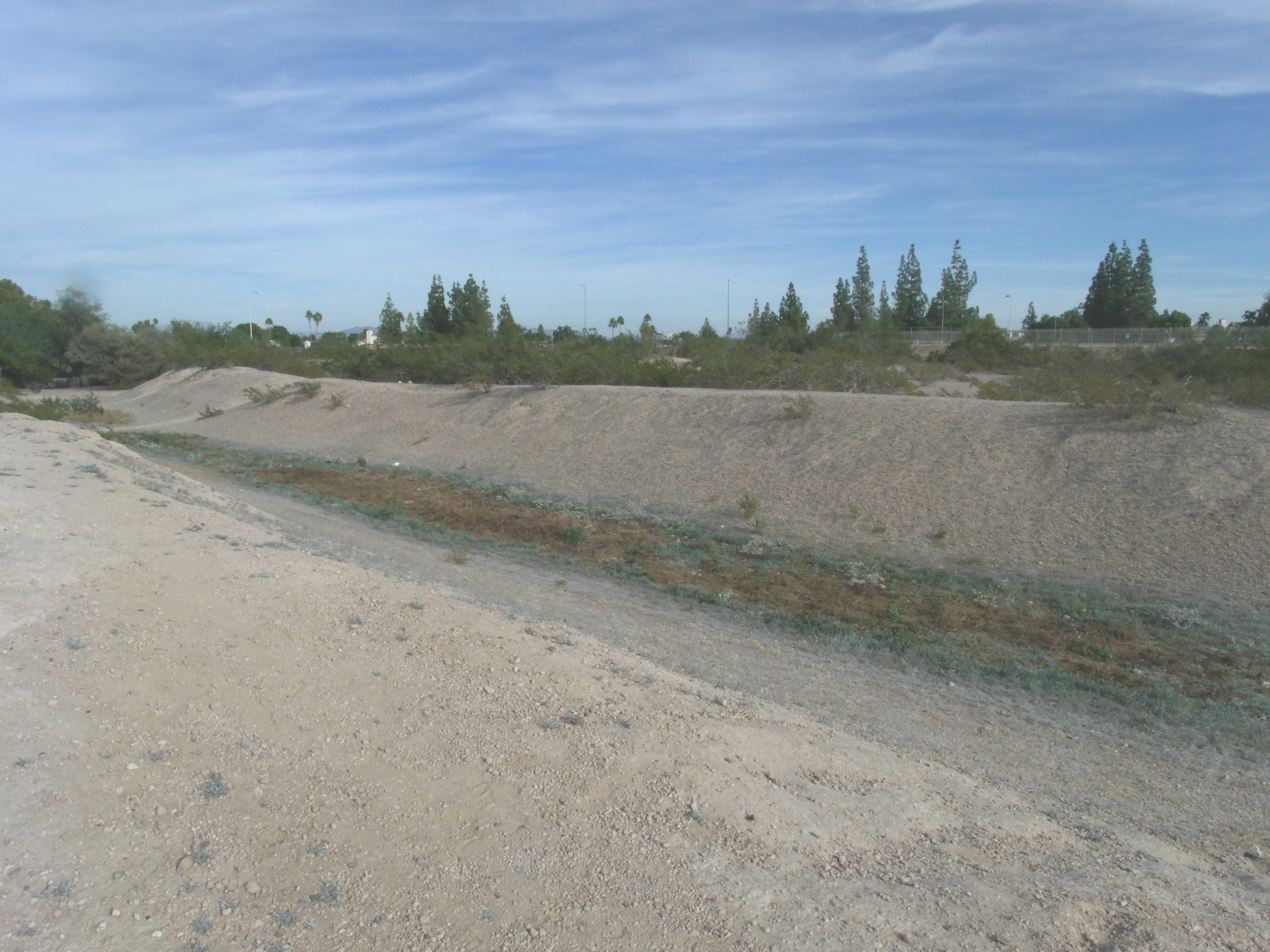
This ancient Hohokam canal in Mesa was cleaned out by the Mormon pioneers in 1875.

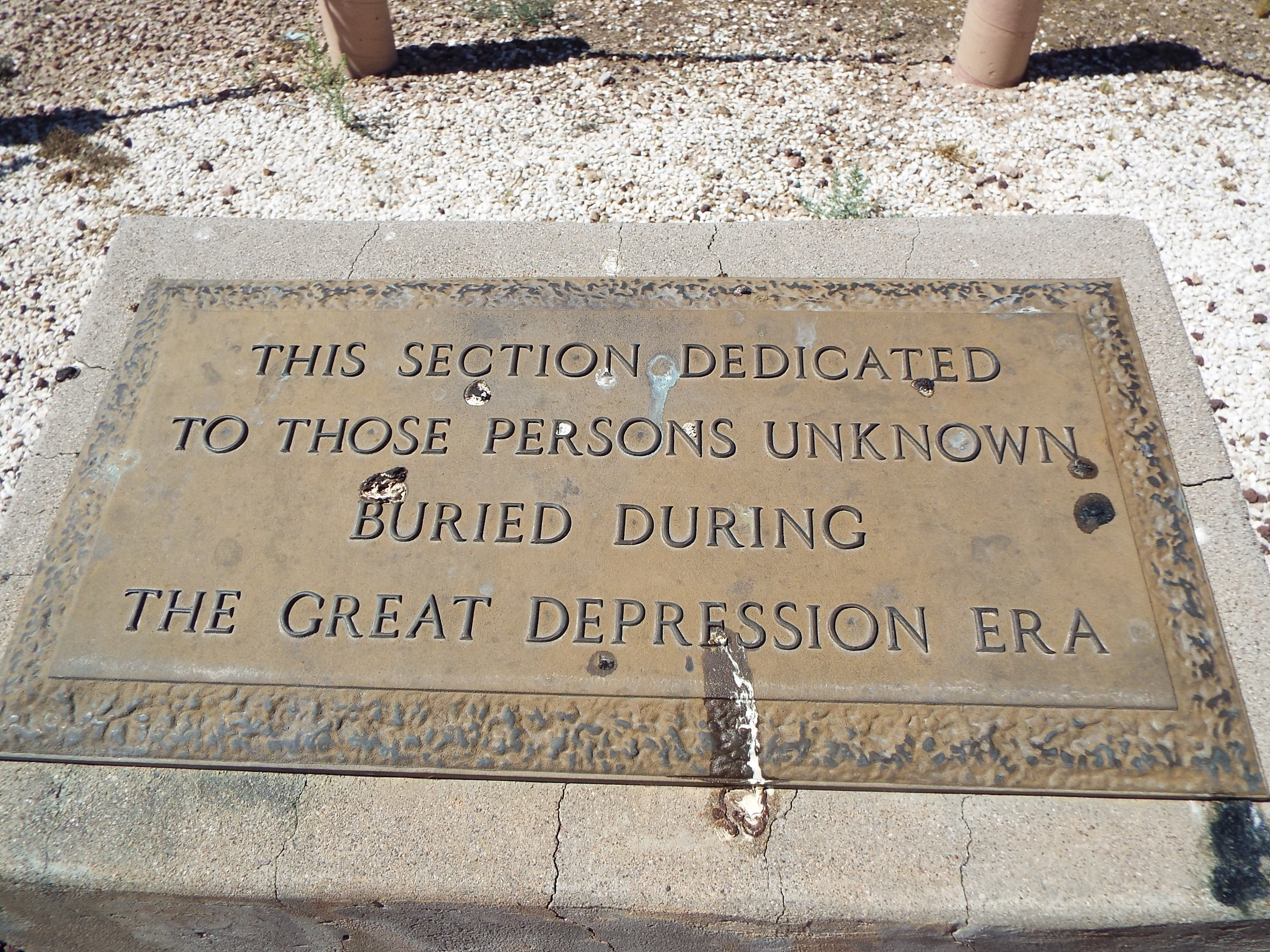
The marker of the buried unknown of the Great Depression era.

The first known inhabitants of the area were the Hohokam, a Native-American tribe. The Hohokam were the builders of the original canal system in this area and the area of Maricopa in general. The canals were the largest and most sophisticated in the prehistoric Western Hemisphere. It is unknown what happened to the Hohokam and their destiny. With the disappearance of the Hohokam, the area was then settled by the members of the Apache tribe.

In 1877, Daniel Webster Jones, a Mormon pioneer, left St. George, Utah to lead an expedition in Arizona with the intention of founding a Mormon settlement. Jones' settlement was initially known as Jonesville.

Pioneers Francis Martin Pomeroy, Charles Crismon, George Warren Sirrine and Charles I. Robson arrived from Utah and founded the First Mesa Company. This company dug irrigation canals, but not in Jonesville. Instead the canals were dug on top of a mesa nearby, thus the namesake of the current town. In 1880 the Second Mesa Company settled to the west of the First Mesa Company.

On July 17, 1878, Mesa City was registered as a townsite and in 1883, the first cemetery in Mesa was established. In 1891, the citizens of Mesa decided to purchase land along Center Street north of Brown Road to officially establish acuity cemetery after a smallpox epidemic that claimed the lives of 44 residents. In this land they established what is now the City of Mesa Cemetery. The cemetery is operated by the City of Mesa Parks, Recreation and Community Facilities Department.

The cemetery is divided into the following five interment sections:

- The Garden Section
- The Original Section
- The Rolling Meadows Section
- The Heritage Garden Section, established in 1998
- The North View Area, established in 2013.

There are also "infant sections". The infant grave sites are located within the North View and Heritage Garden sections. The cemetery has a "Memorial Acres", which is an expansion section containing an additional 1,059 grave sites.:

The cemetery has a special section in the "Historical Area" where the unknowns who perished during the Great Depression era are buried. There is a memorial on the grounds dedicated to their memory. The area reflects on a bleak period of American history when even permanent memorials were a luxury. There is also a Commonwealth war interment of 23 British Royal Air Force personnel who perished in the Second World War.

== Notable interments ==
Among the many notable citizens of the city who are interred in the cemetery are the following:

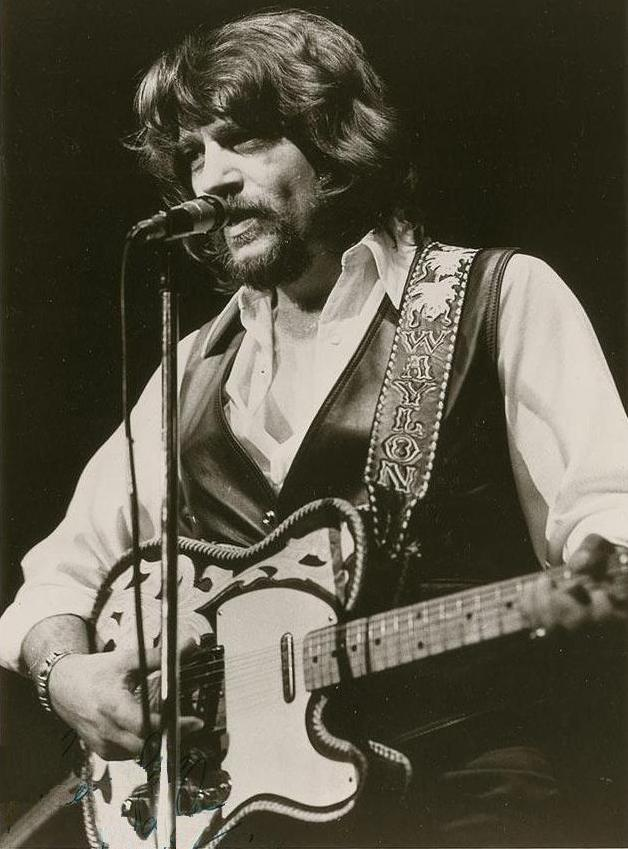
Waylon Jennings

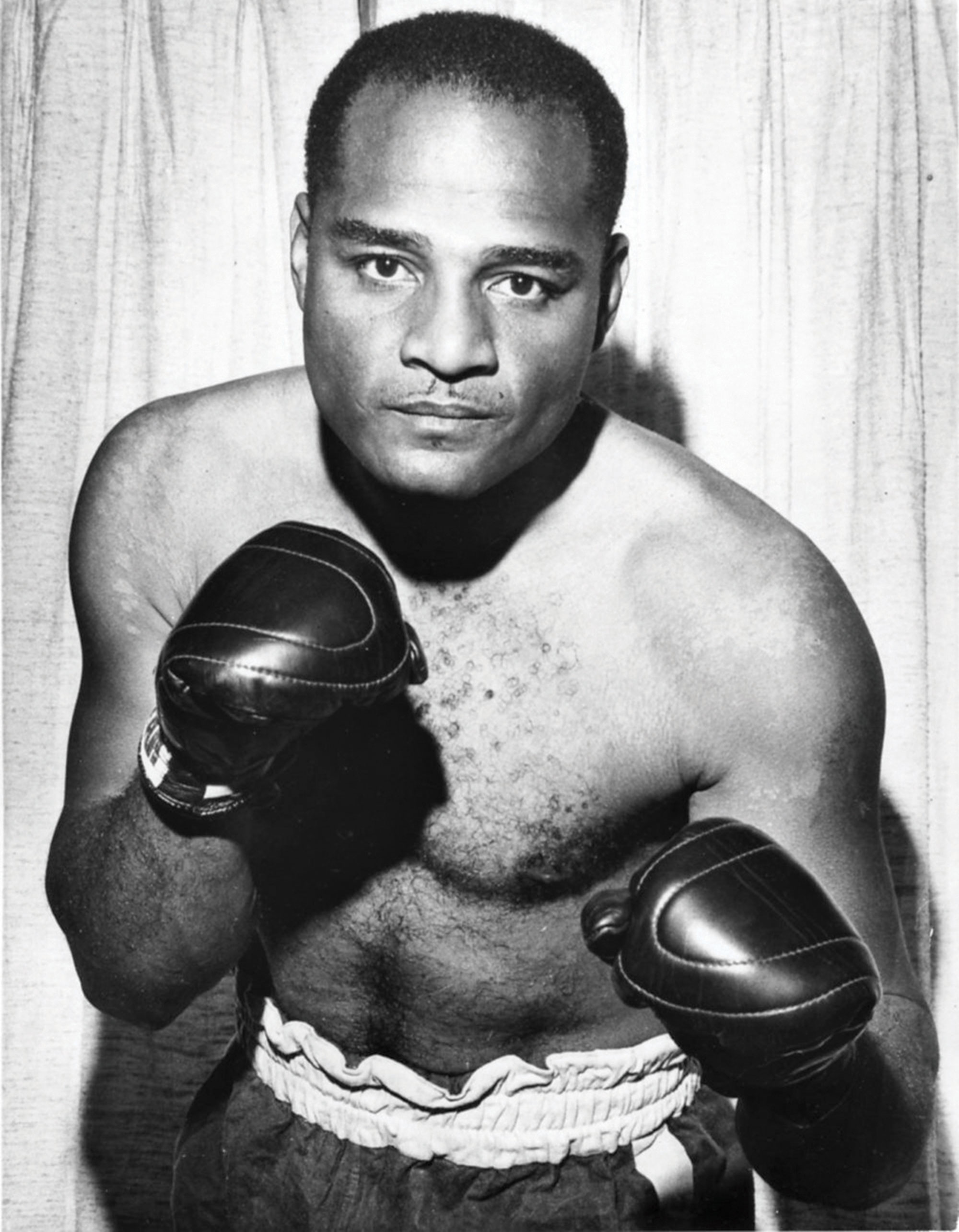
Zora B. Folley Jr.

- Dr. Lucius C. Alston (1892–1958) – Dr. Alston was the first African-American doctor to serve Mesa. His house is listed in the National Register of Historic Places, reference number 12000240.
- Oscar Virgil Crismon (1909–1985) – Crismon served as Mayor of Mesa from 1950 to 1952.
- George Nicholas Goodman (1885–1959) – A pharmacist in Mesa, Arizona. Goodman was the mayor of Mesa for 5 different 2 year terms as part of 3 different decades. George Nicholas Goodman served as the executive secretary of the Arizona State Fair Commission at the time of his death, and was the former president of both the Arizona Pharmaceutical Association (now the Arizona Pharmacy Association) and the Arizona Municipal League (now the League of Arizona Cities and Towns).
- Pedro Warner Guerrero (1896–1995) – Guererro was the founder of the Guerrero-Lindsey Sign Company. In 1946, with R.G. Scarborough and Ann Encke, he founded the Rosarita Mexican Foods Company. Rosita has become a nationwide known brand. Mesa's Pedro Guerrero Rotary Park is named for him.
- R. Scott Stapley (1958–1985) – R. 'Scott' Stapley was the victim of serial killers Leonard Lake and Charles Ng in 1985 in Northern California.
- William Johnson LeBaron (1856–1929) – LeBaron served as Mayor of Mesa from 1888 to 1896.
- Collins Rowes Hakes (1837–1916) and Mabel Ana Morse Hakes (1840–1909) – Collins Rowes Hakes, together with Riley Morse and Orlando and Orin Merrill, was the first to discover gold in the Goldfield area by the Superstition Mountains. His wife was president of the Mesa Ward Relief Society for five years and counselor and then president of the Maricopa Stake Relief Society, and was the Mesa representative to the Woman's Suffrage Convention in Chicago in 1893.
- Waylon Jennings (1937–2002) – Jennings was an American singer, songwriter, musician, and actor. Jennings gave up his seat on the ill-fated flight that crashed and killed Buddy Holly, J. P. Richardson, Ritchie Valens, and pilot Roger Peterson. In 2001, he was inducted into the Country Music Hall of Fame.
- Daniel Webster Jones (1830–1915) – Jones was commissioned by Brigham Young to start a Mormon settlement in the Salt River Valley of Arizona. The settlement was originally called Jonesville and later renamed Lehi. Lehi was eventually incorporated into Mesa.
- John L. Lee a.k.a. "Powder River Jack" (1874–1946) – Lee was a cowboy who was known for setting cowboy poems to music. He was an entertainer in Buffalo Bill Cody's Wild West Show. "Across the Great Divide", "The Cody Stampede" and "The Song of the San Marcos" are among the many songs which he wrote. His wife, Kitty Lee, (1868–1955) is buried alongside him.
- Ramon Garcia Mendoza (1914–1999) – R.G. Mendoza was the first Hispanic police chief in Mesa. His house is listed in the Mesa Historic Property Register. He was the son of Ramon Somoza Mendoza.
- Ramon Somoza Mendoza (1876–1951) – Mendoza was the first Hispanic police officer in Meza. The Mendoza Elementary School in Mesa was named in his honor. His son Ramon G. Mendoza, who led the department from 1969 to 1978, was Mesas' first Hispanic police chief.
- Ernesto Arturo Miranda (1941–1976) – Miranda was a laborer whose conviction on kidnapping, rape, and armed robbery charges based on his confession under police interrogation was set aside in the landmark U.S. Supreme Court case (Miranda v. Arizona), which ruled that criminal suspects must be informed of their right against self-incrimination and their right to consult with an attorney before being questioned by police. This warning is known as the Miranda Rights.
- Ralph Fleetwood Palmer (1875–1954) – Dr. Palmer served as the mayor of Mesa from 1910 to 1912.
- Charles Shreeve Peterson (1818–1889) – early Mormon leader. Peterson was a member of the Utah Territorial Legislature, and one of the first settlers in the Mormon colonies in Mexico.
- Orley Seymour Stapley (1872–1942) – Stapley served in the Arizona State Senate from 1914 to 1915. He established a chain of hardware stores throughout the state. Stapley Junior High School in Mesa was named in his honor.
- Zora B. Folley (1931–1972) March 22, 1967, Folley faced the world heavyweight champion Muhammad Ali. Folley was the last man to face Ali before Ali's three-year exile from boxing in 1967.

Also interred are the four founding fathers of Mesa:

- Charles Crismon (1805–1890)
- Francis Martin Pomeroy (1822–1882)
- Charles Innes Robson (1837–1894)
- George Warren Sirrine (1818–1902). His house, the "Sirrine house", is listed in the National Register of Historic Places, reference number 95001082.

== Graves ==
City of Mesa Cemetery

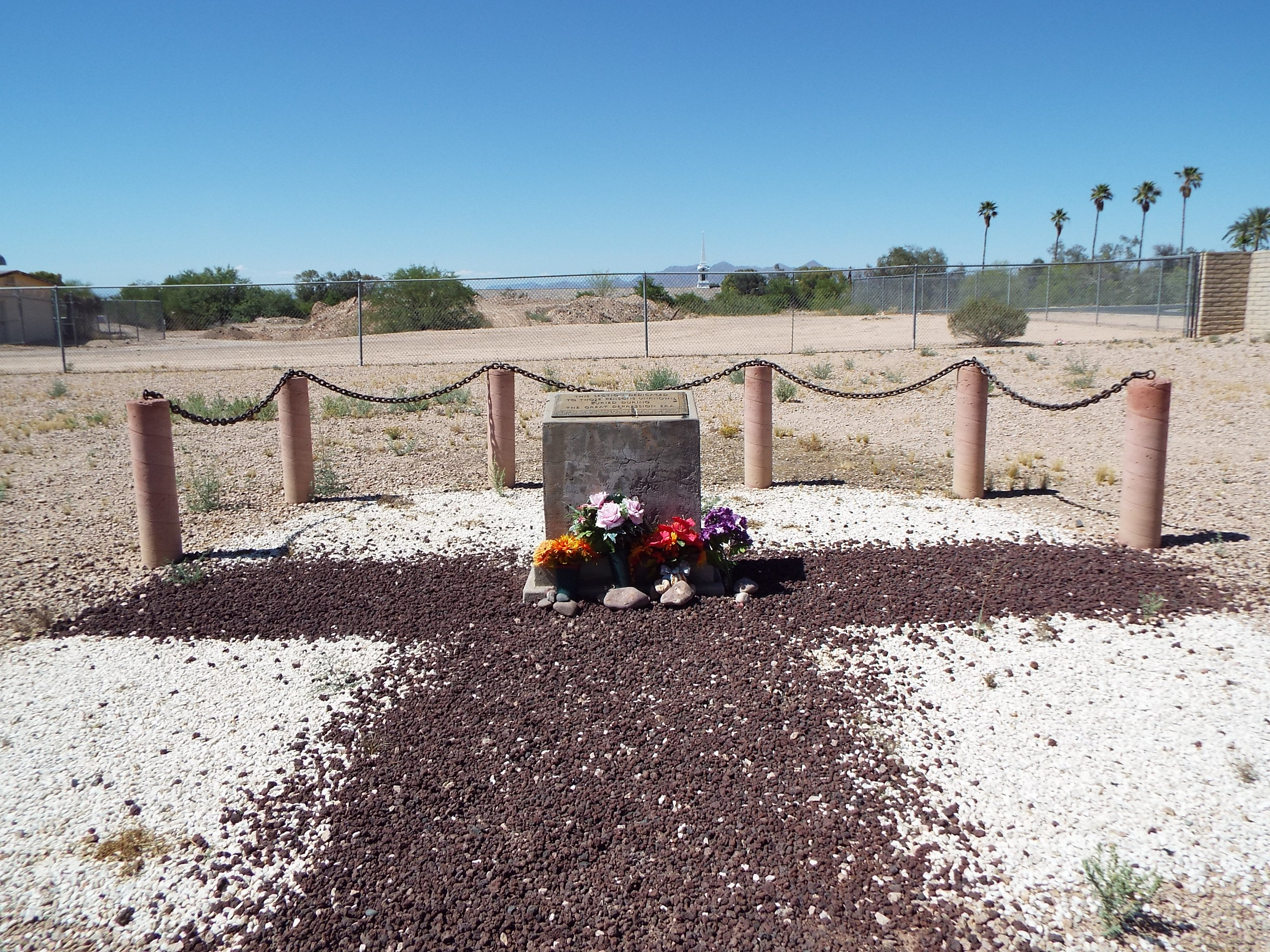
Memorial dedicated to the unknown who were buried there during the Great Depression era.

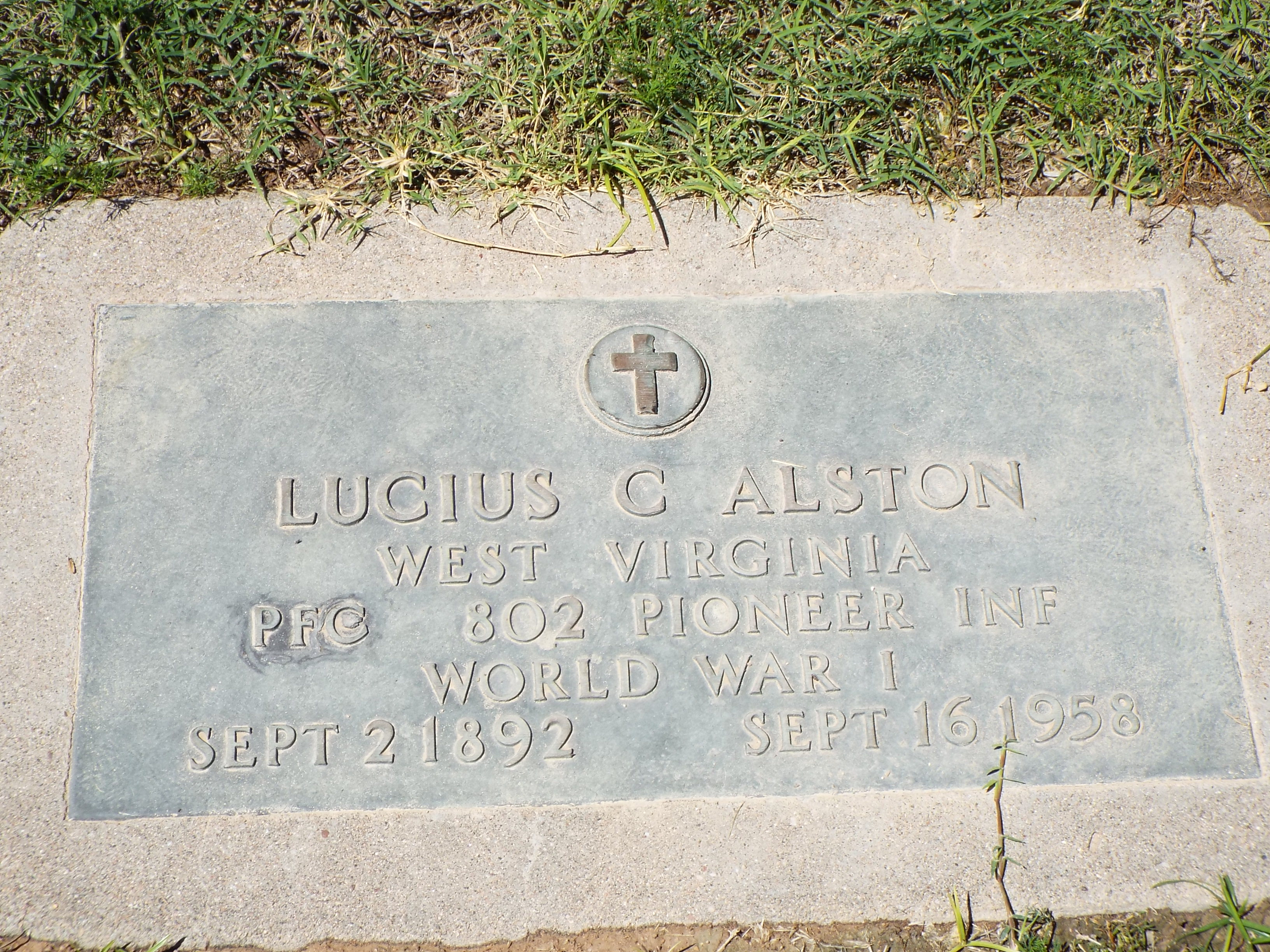
Grave site of Dr. Lucius C. Alston (1892–1958), Block #683.

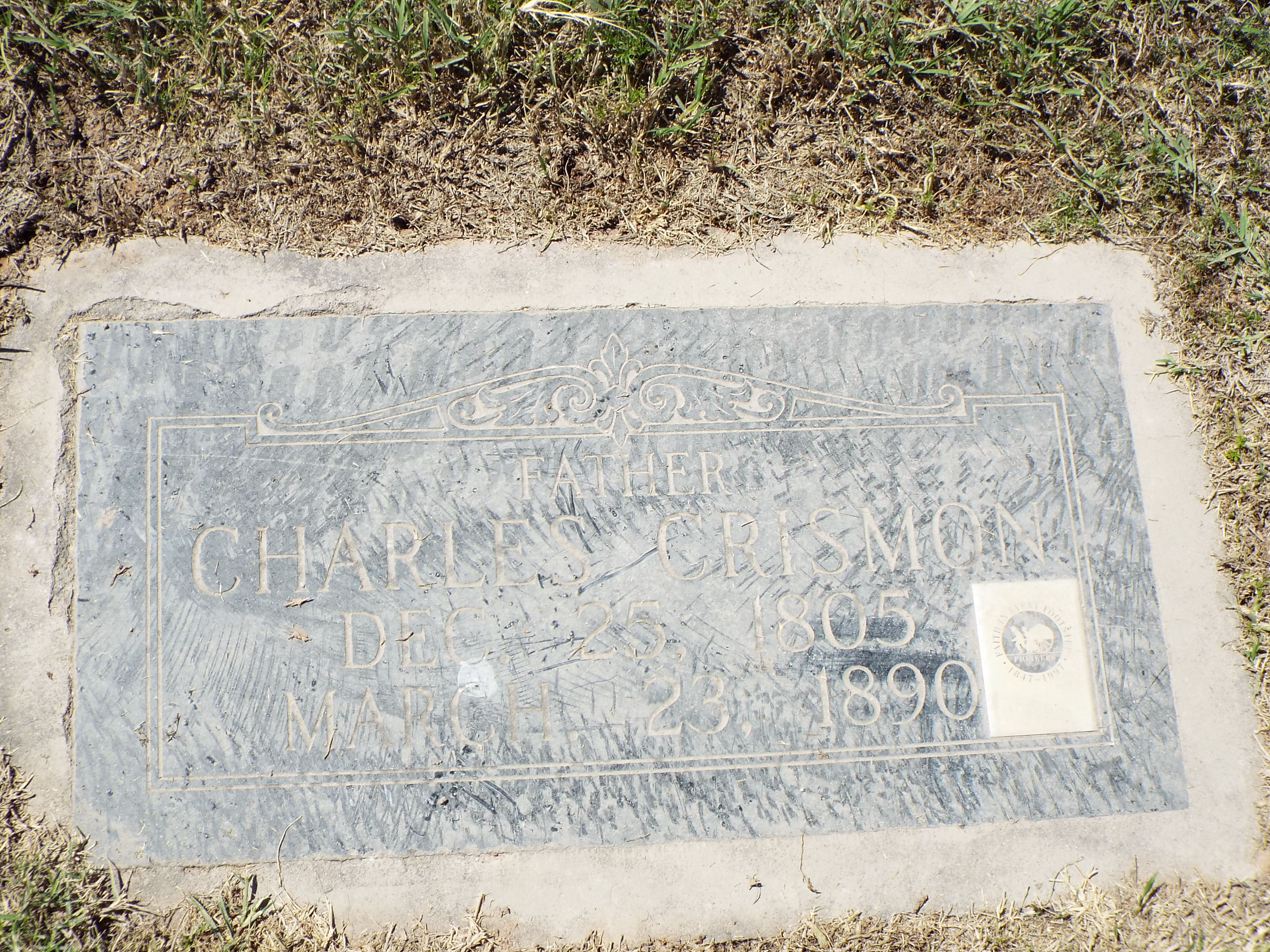
Grave site of Charles Crismon, Block #76.

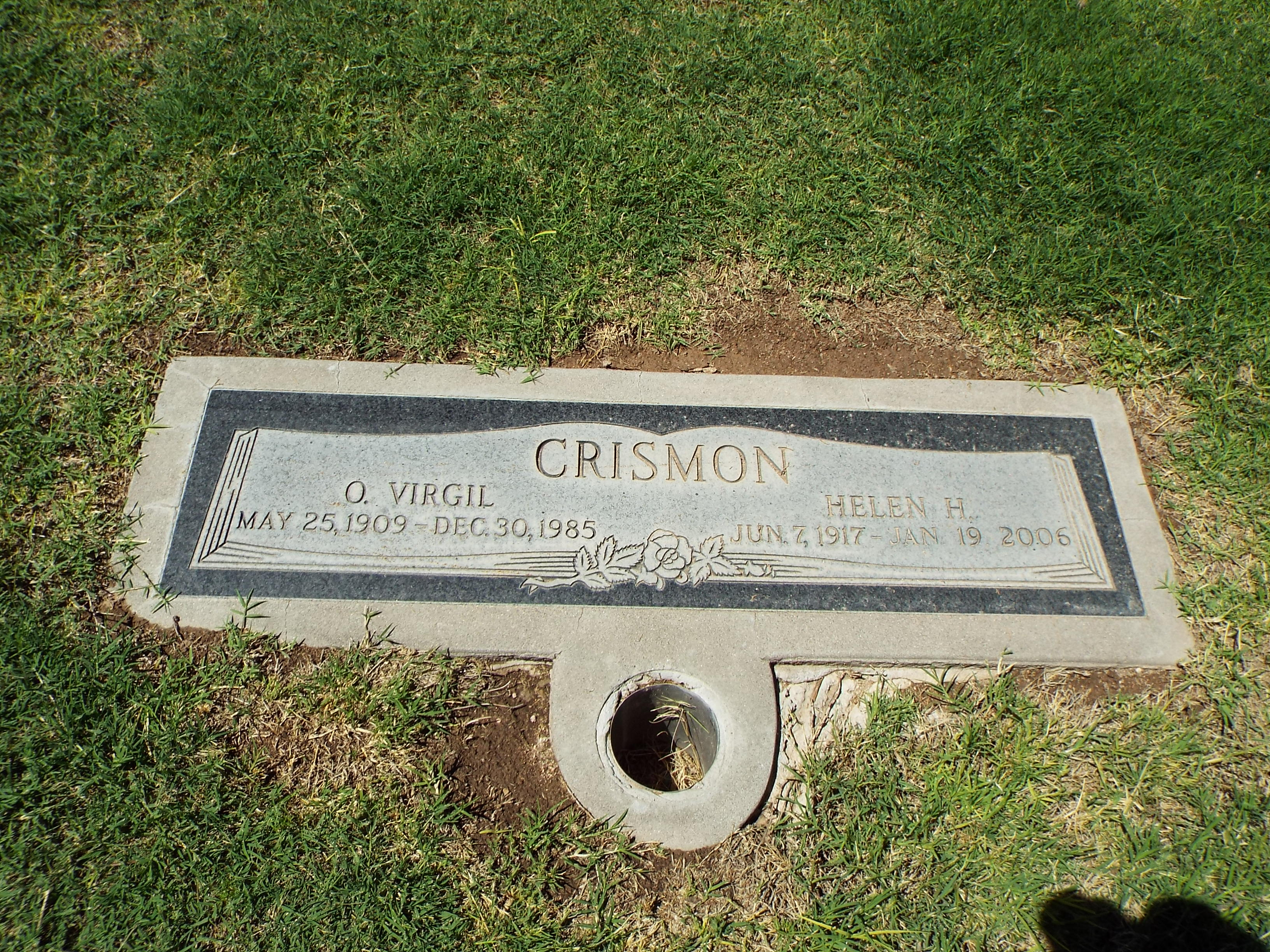
Grave site of Oscar Virgil Crismon (1909–1985) and Helen H. Crismon (1917–2006), Block #888.

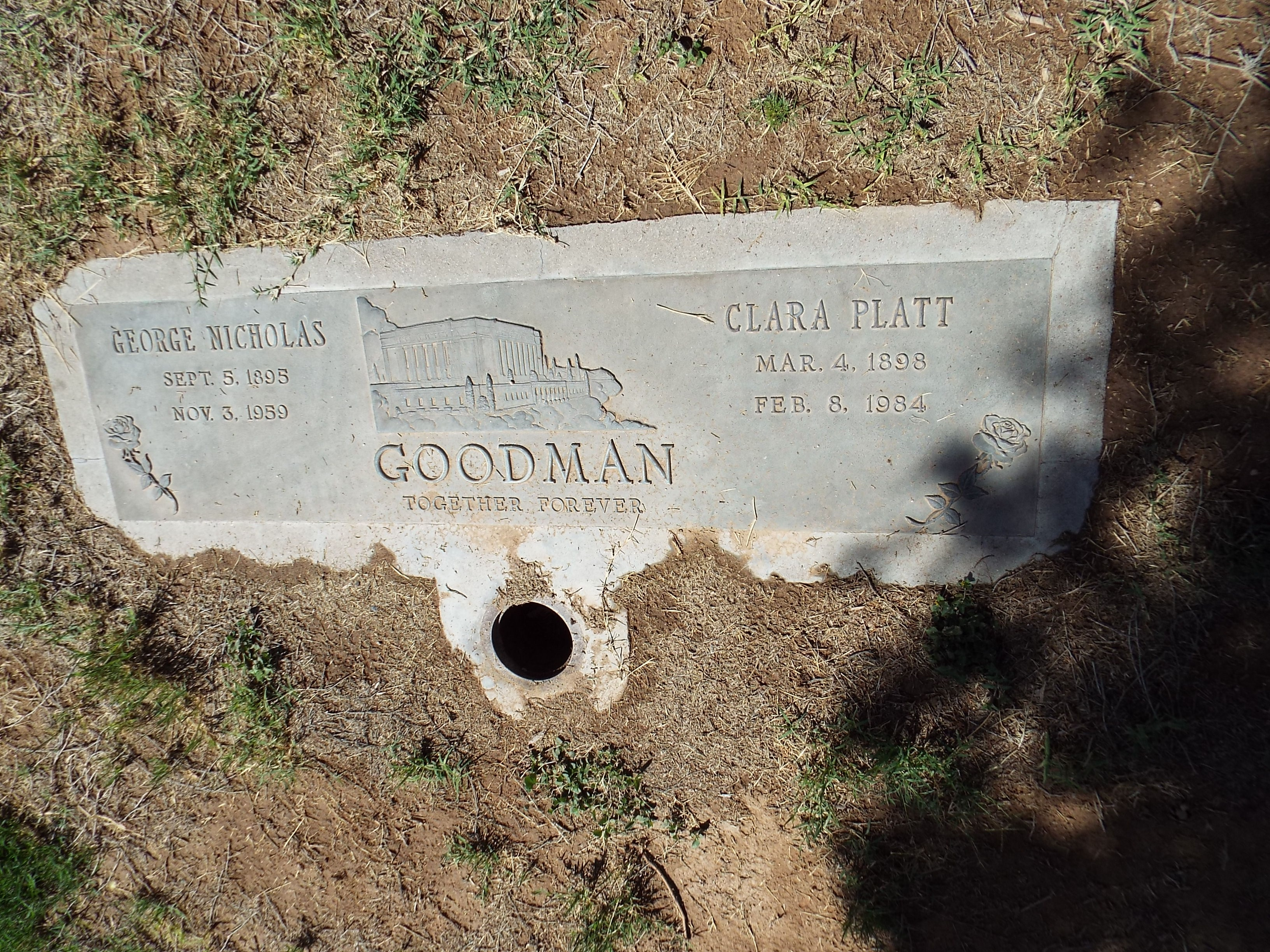
Grave site of George Nicholas Goodman (1885–1959) and Clara Platt Goodman (1898–1994), Block #424.

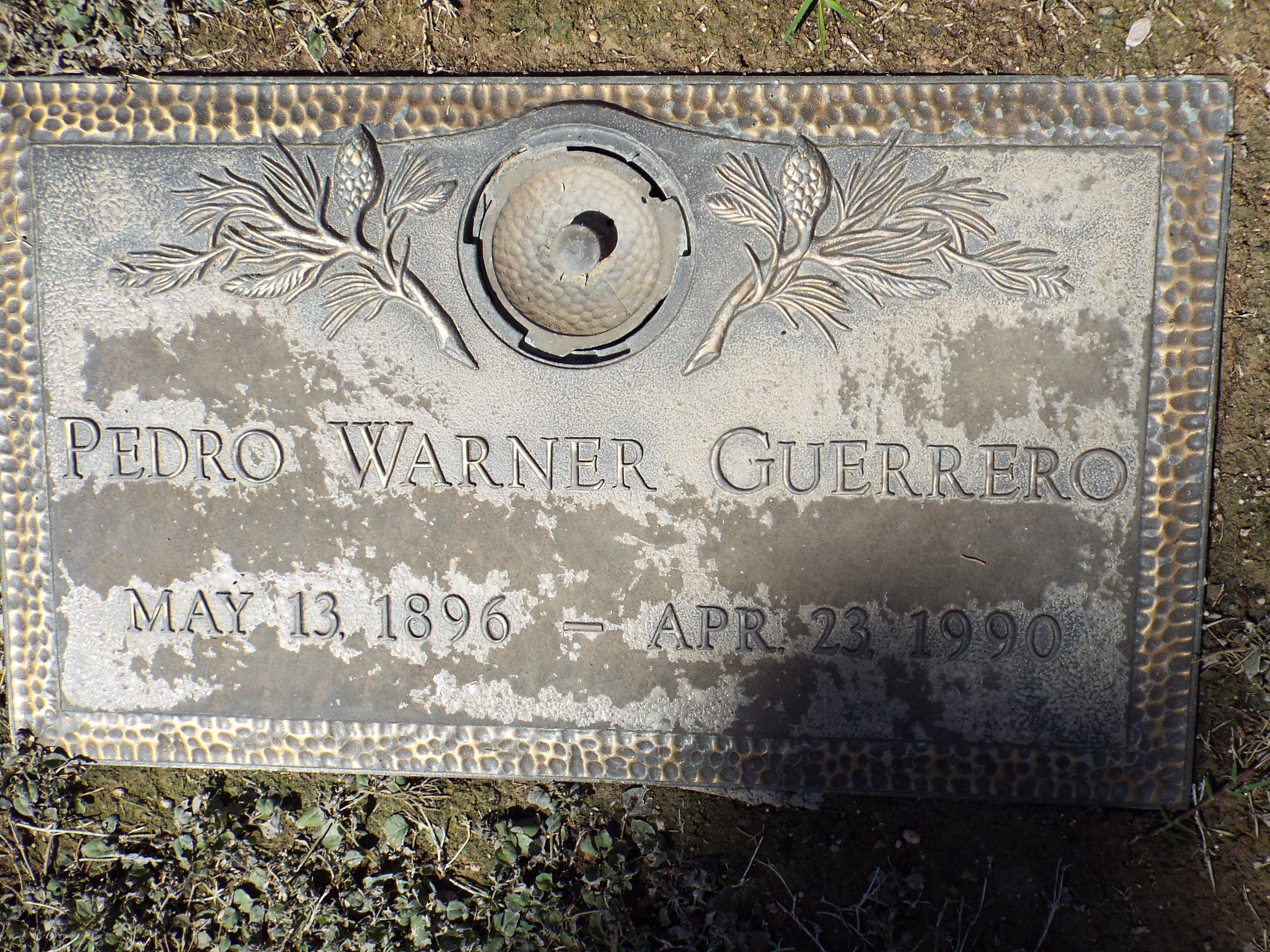
Grave site of Pedro Warner Guerrero (1896–1995), Block #643.

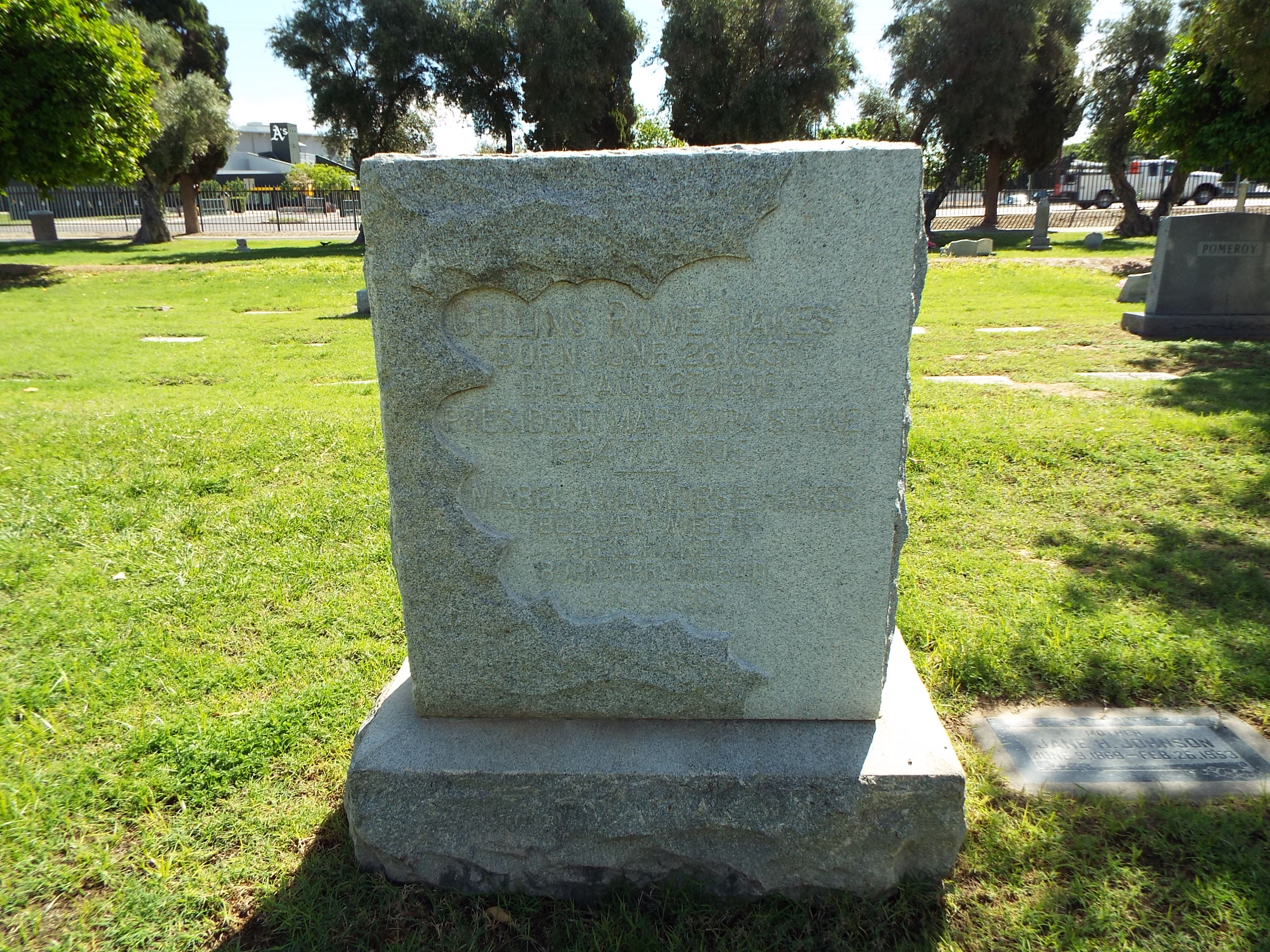
Grave site of Collins Rowes Hakes (1837–1916) and Mabel Ana Morse Hakes (1840–1909), Block #70.

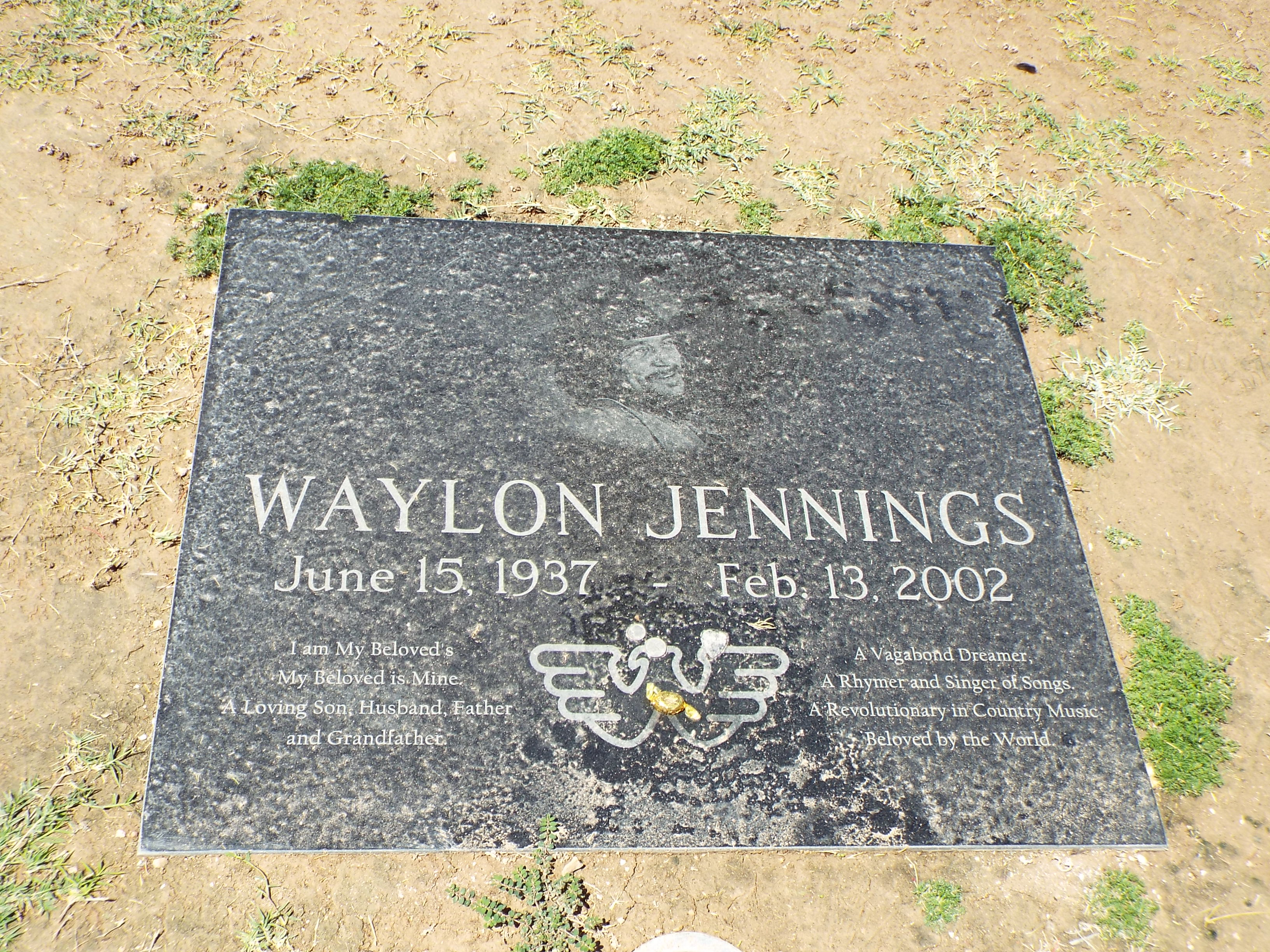
Grave site of Waylon Jennings (1937–2002), Block #744.

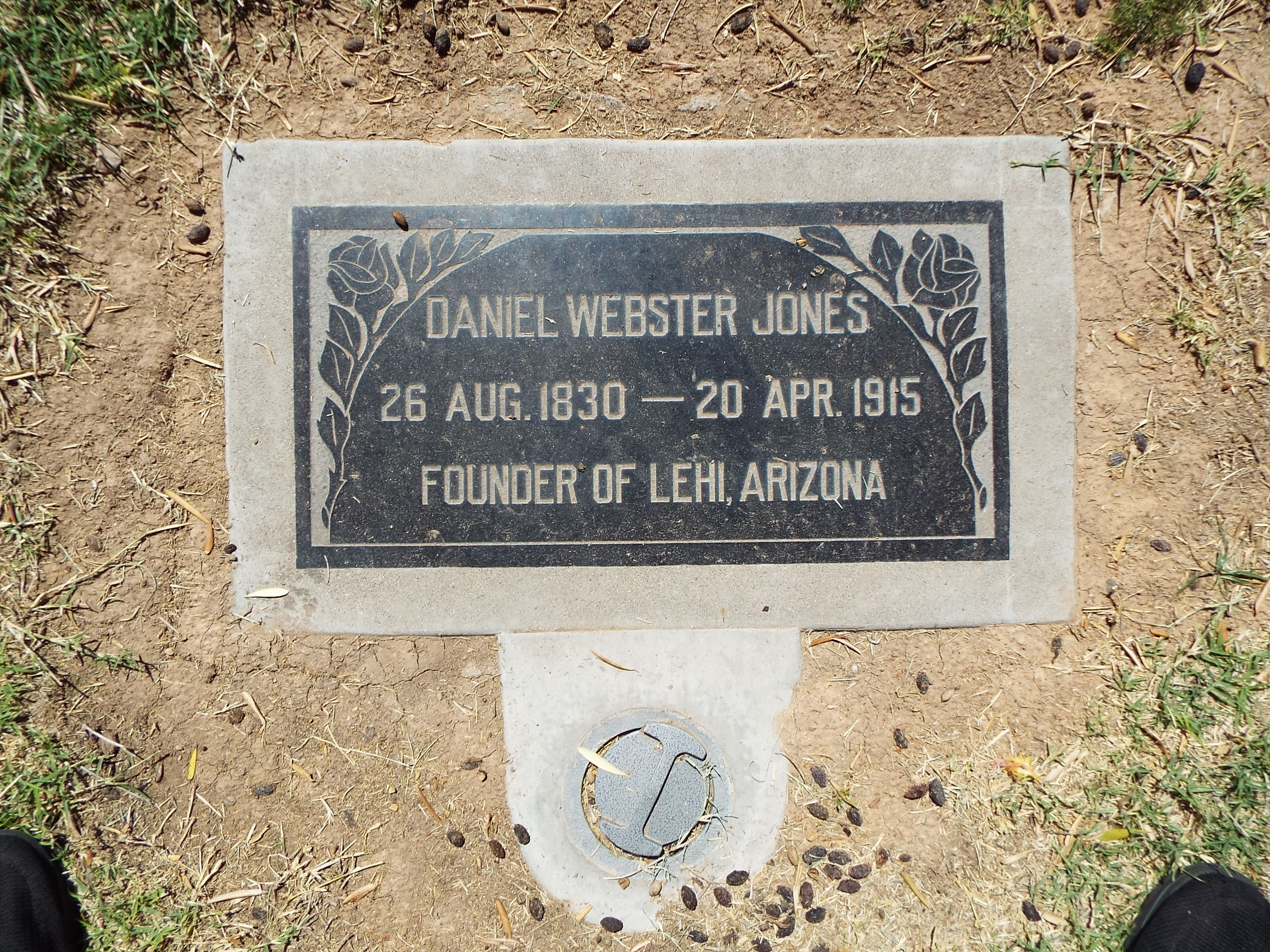
Grave site of Daniel Webster Jones (1830–1915), Block #24.

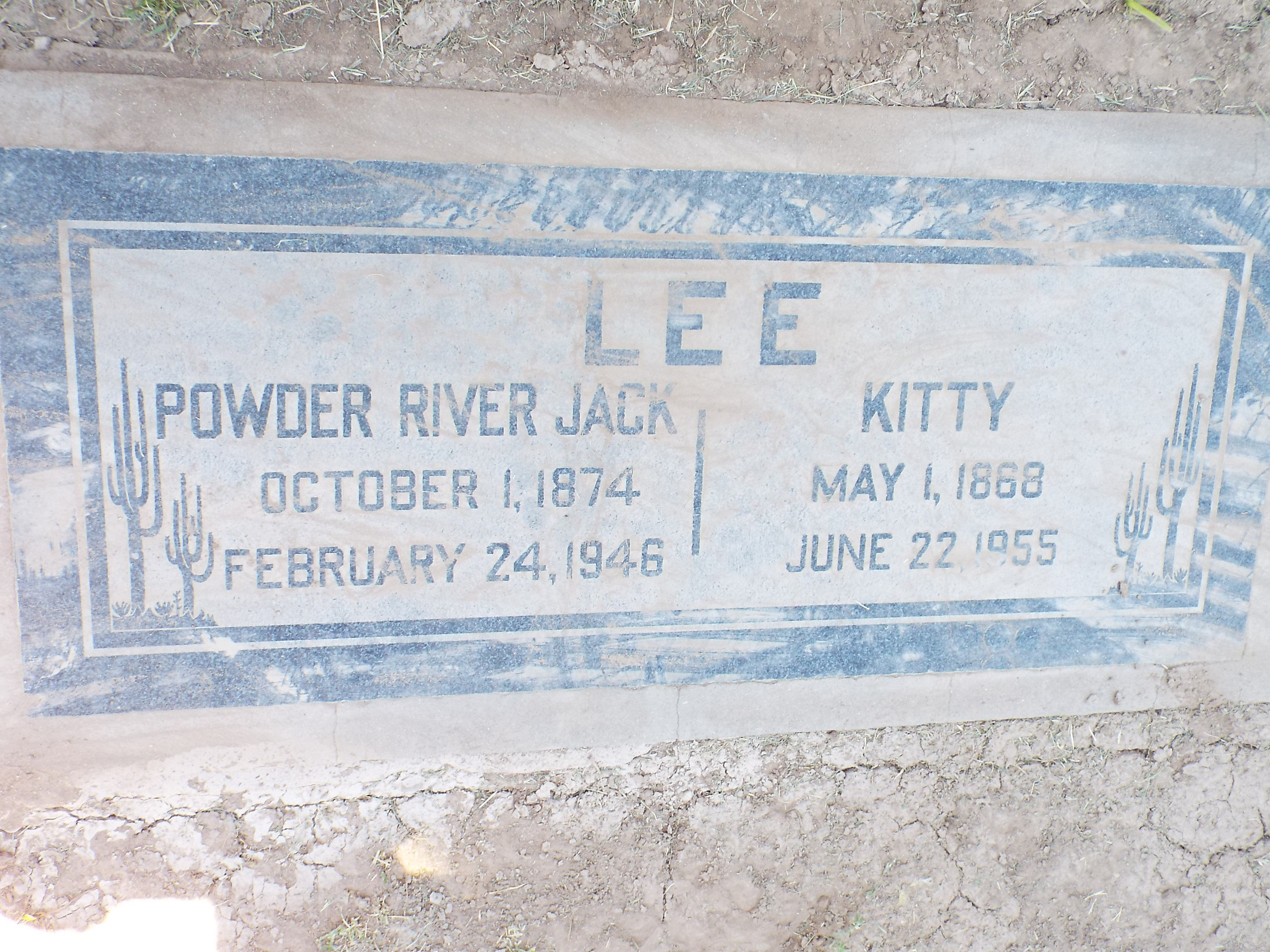
Grave site of John L. Lee (1874–1946) and Kitty Lee (1868–1955), Block #500 .

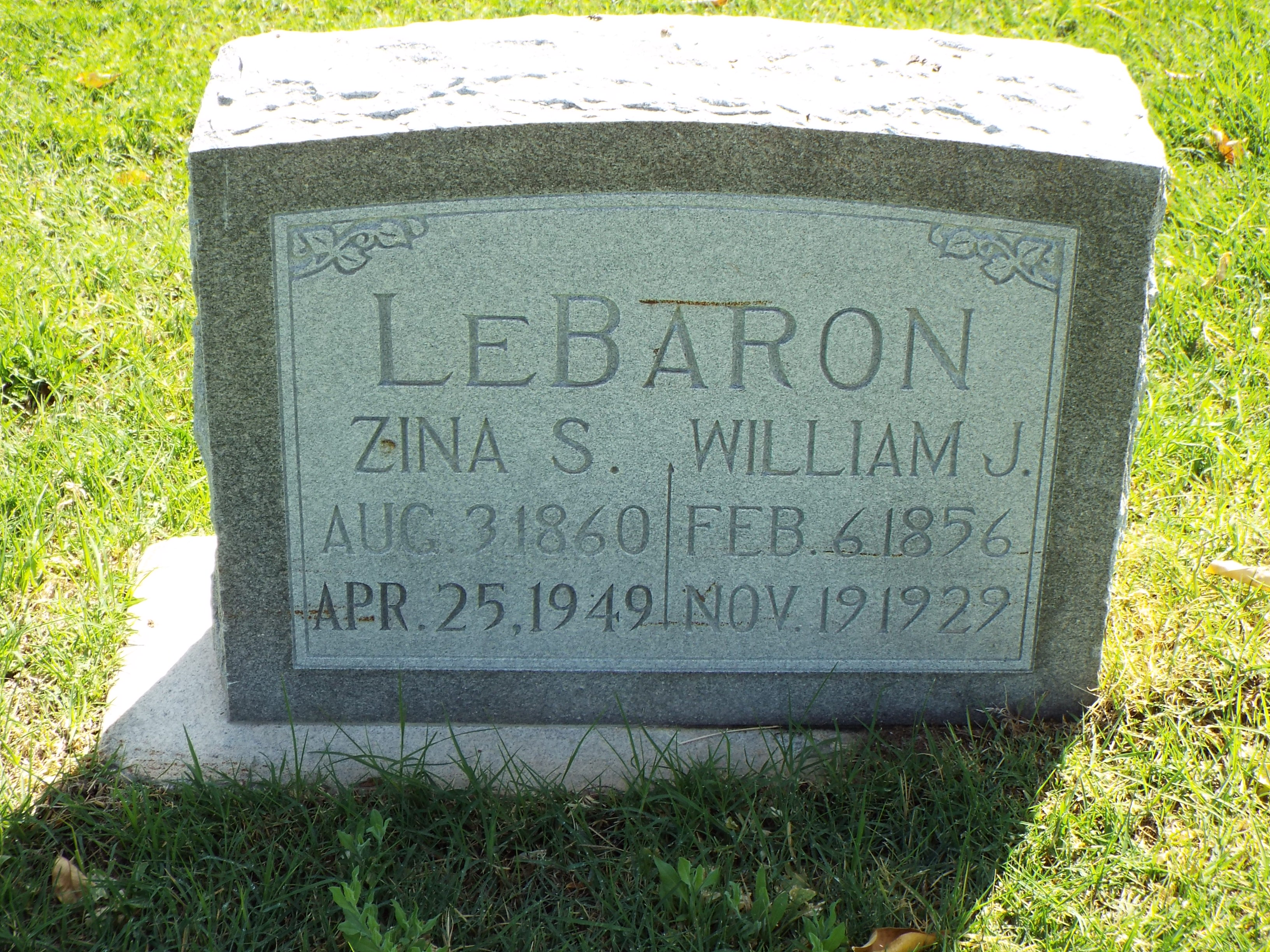
Grave site William Johnson LeBaron (1856–1929) and Zina S. LeBaron, Block #23.

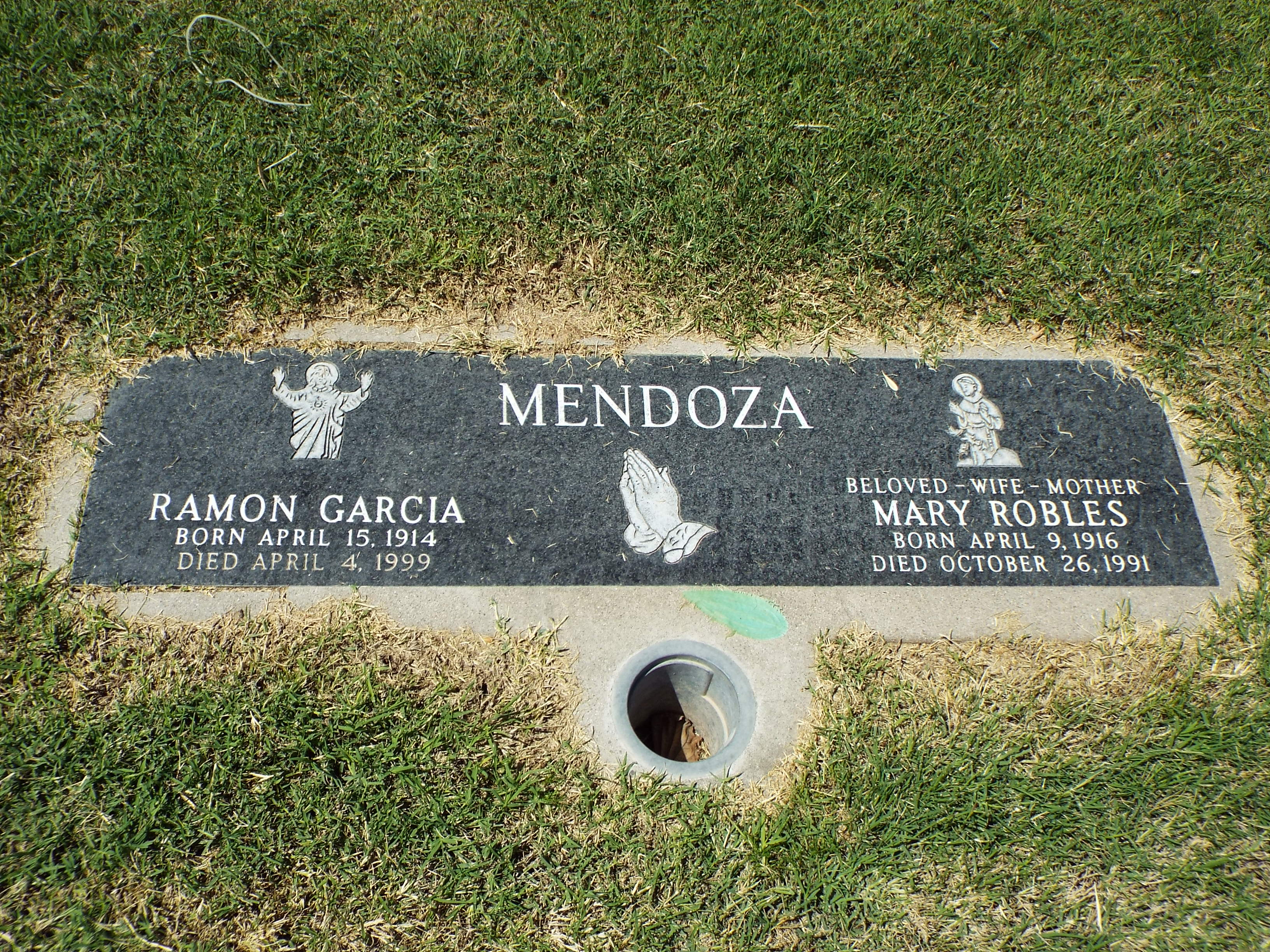
Grave site of Ramon Garcia Mendoza (1914–1999) and Mary Robles Mendoza (1916–1991), Block #165.

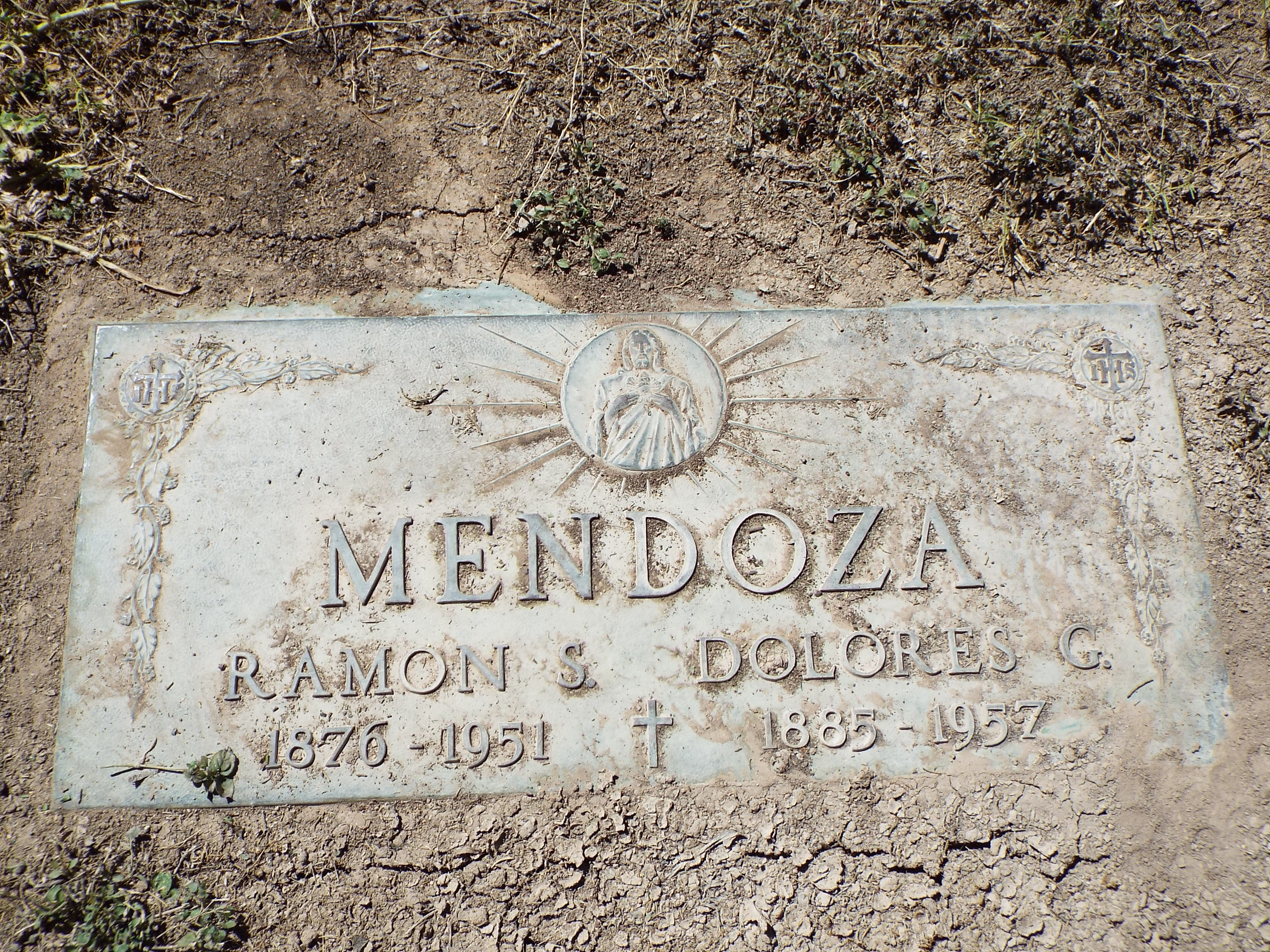
Grave site of Ramon Somoza Mendoza and his wife Dolores Mendoza (1885–1957), Block #533.

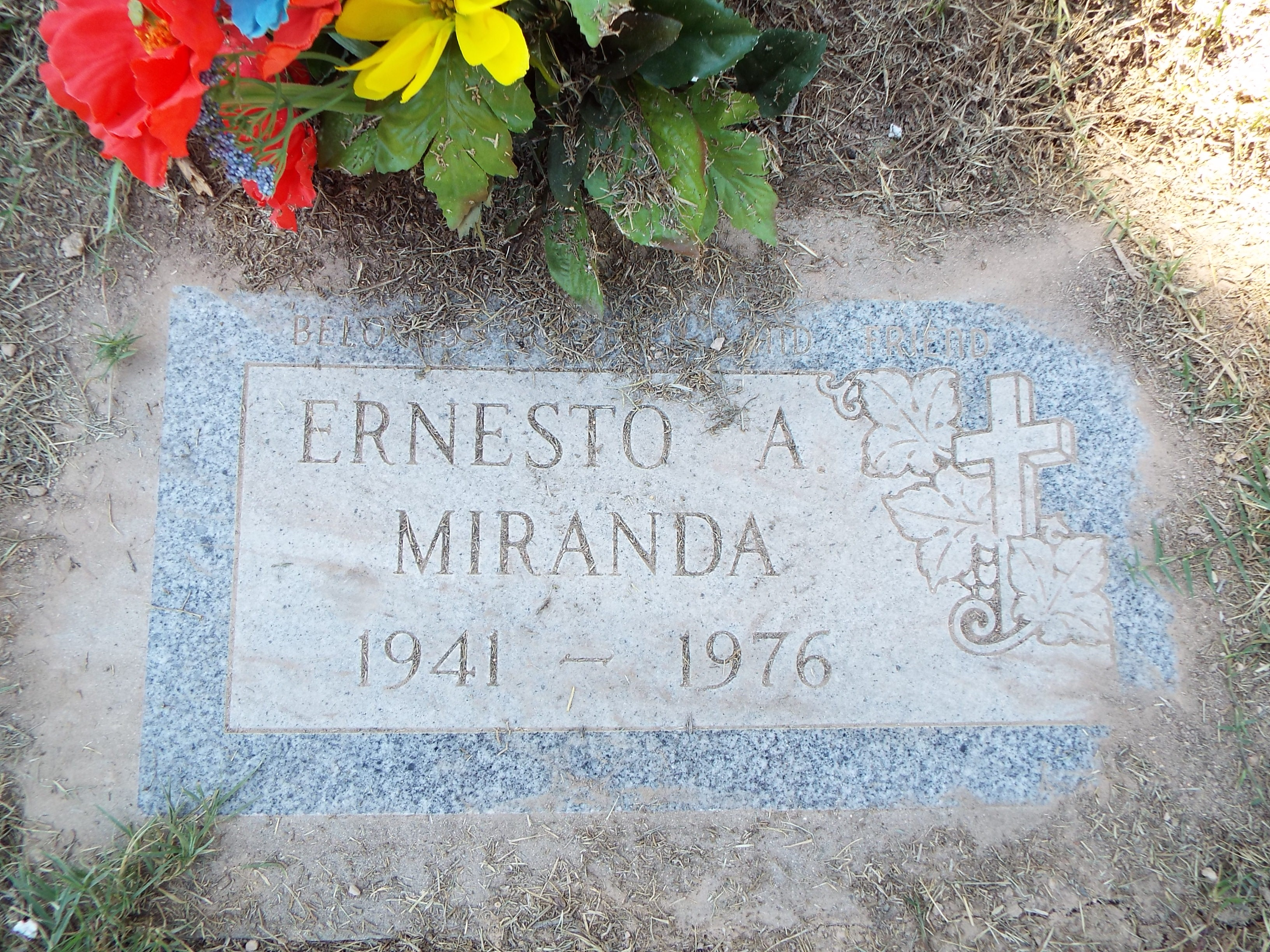
Grave site of Ernesto Arturo Miranda, Block #677.

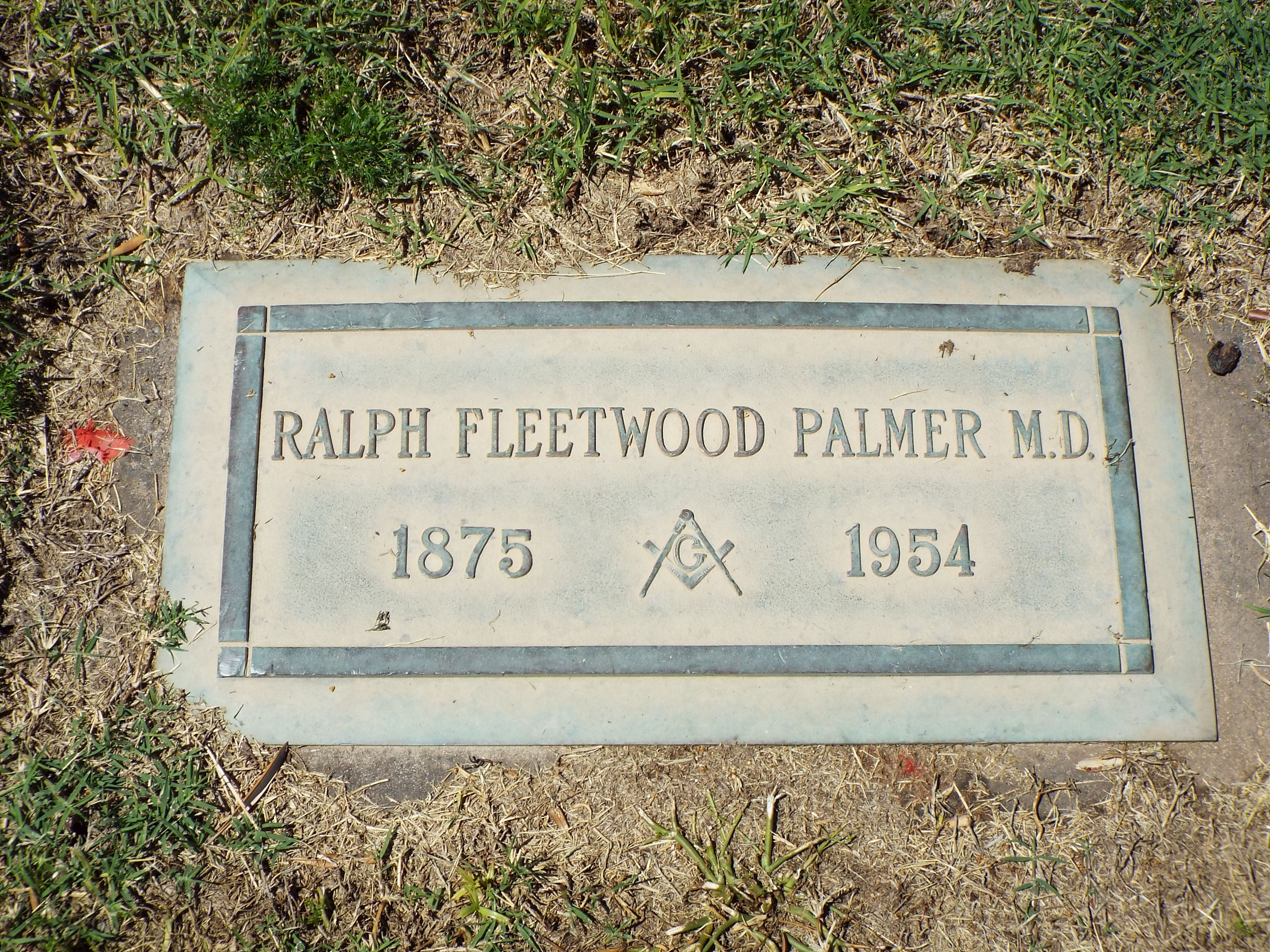
Grave site of Dr. Ralph Fleetwood Palmer (1875–1954), Block #123.

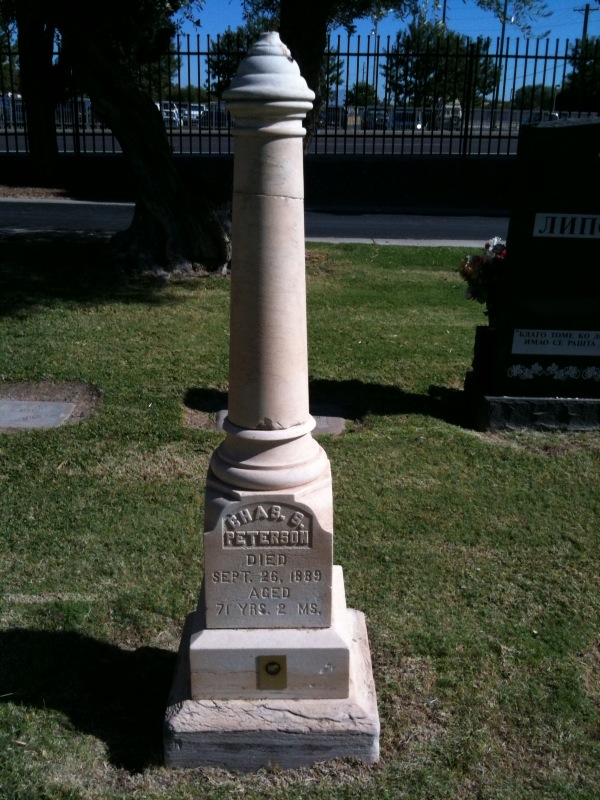
Grave site of Charles Shreeve Peterson

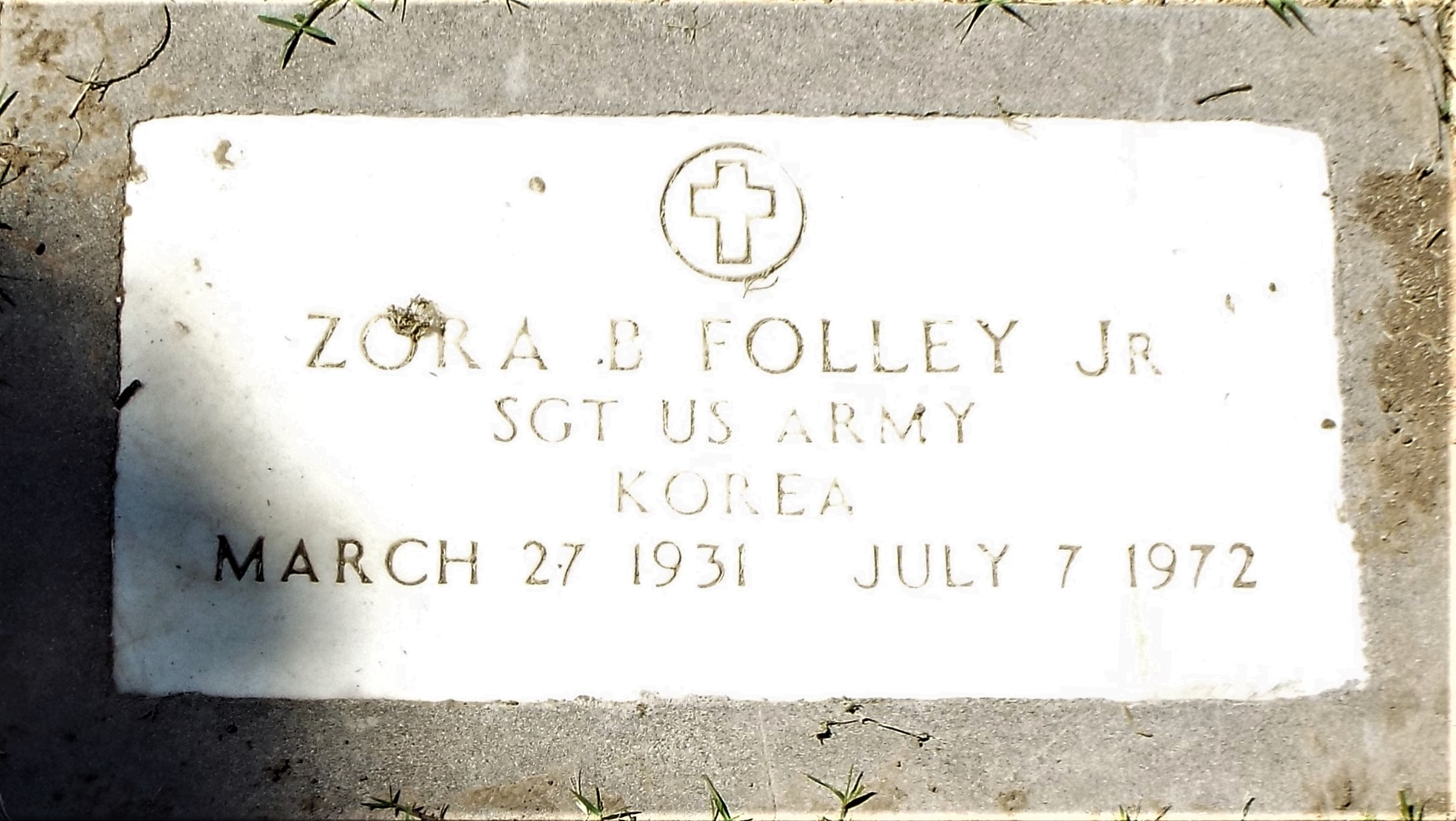
Grave site of Zora B. Folley, Jr., Block #730

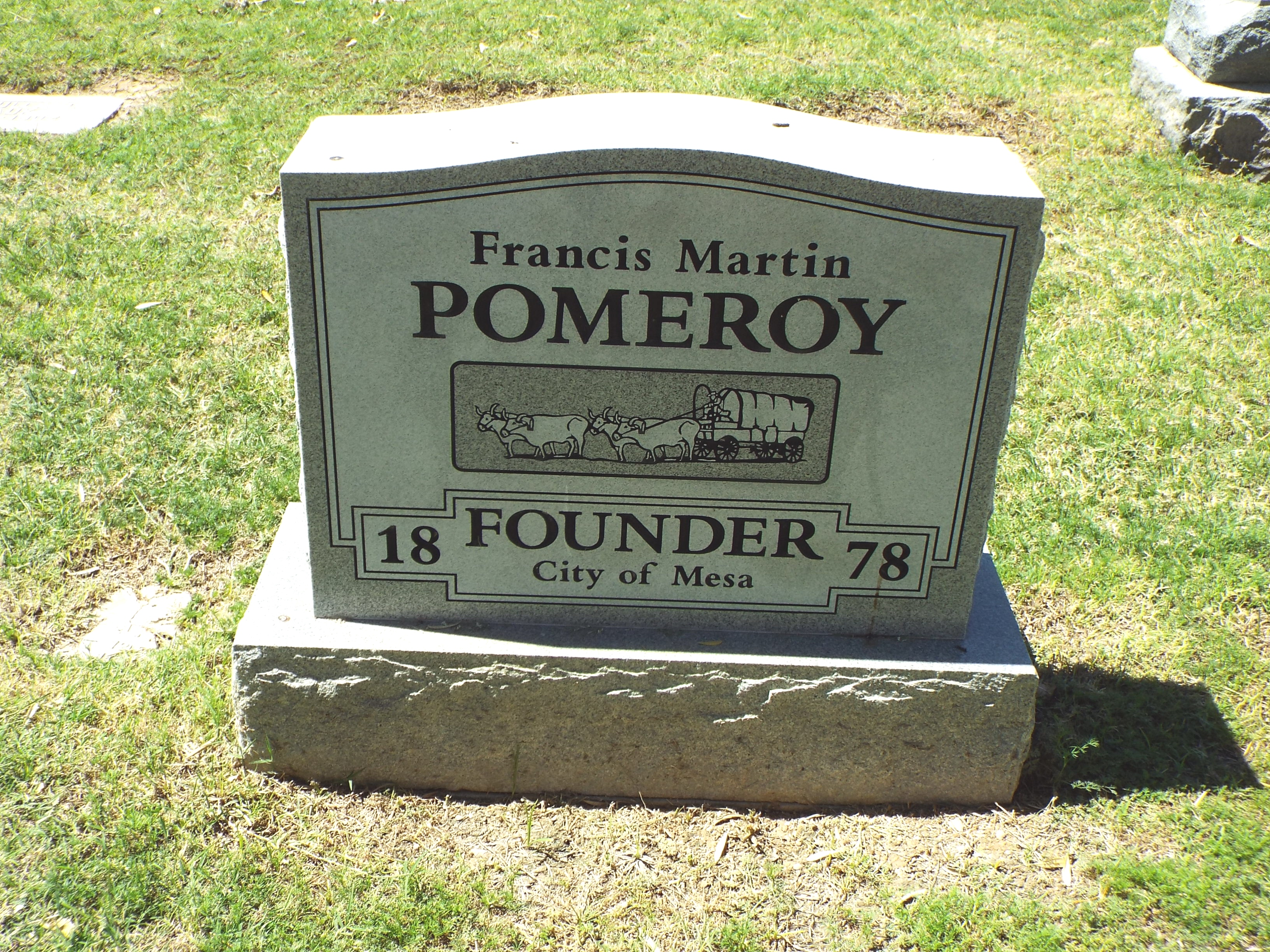
Grave site of Francis Martin Pomeroy, Block #72.

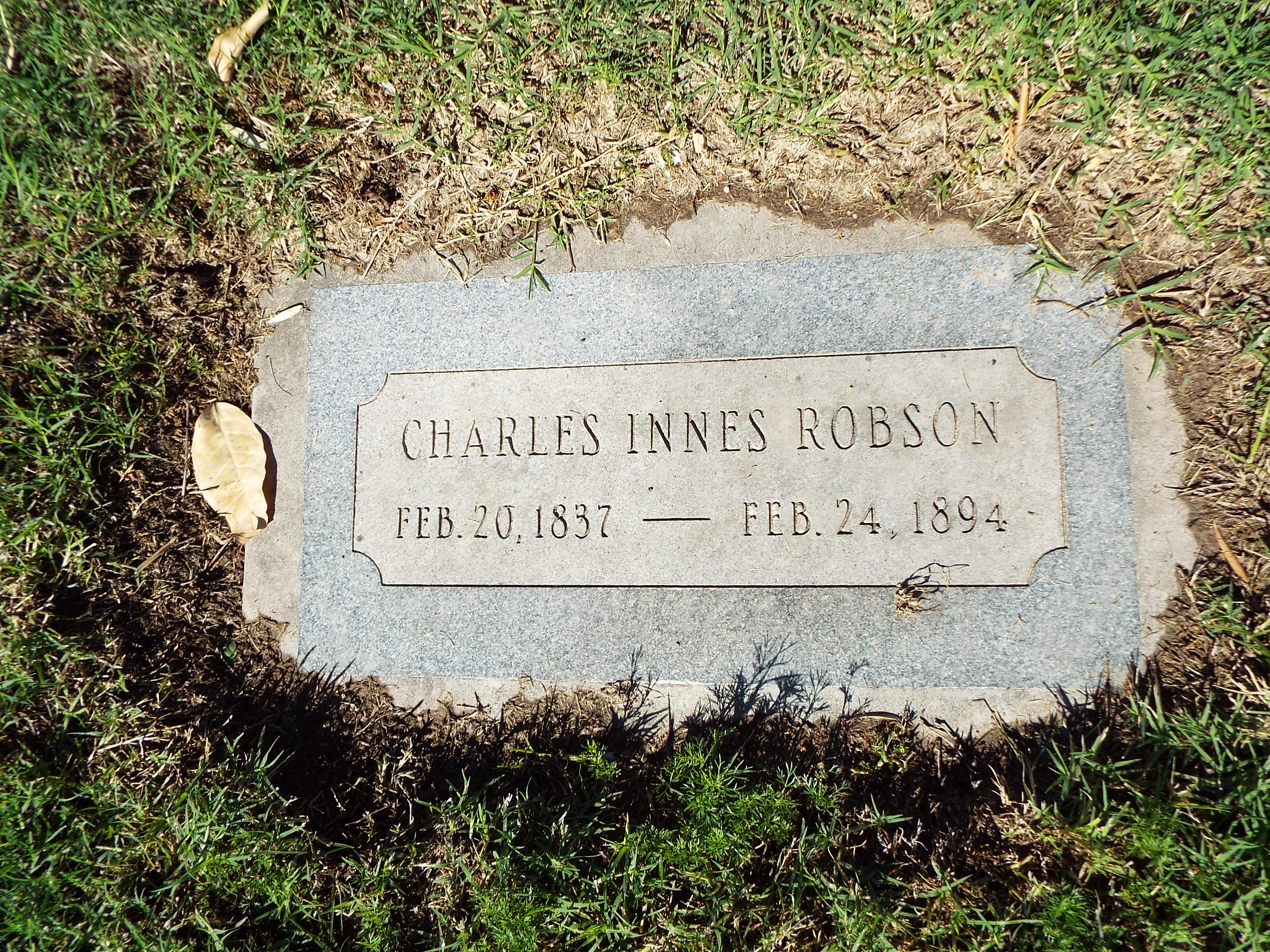
Grave site of Charles Innes Robson (1837–1894), Block #72.

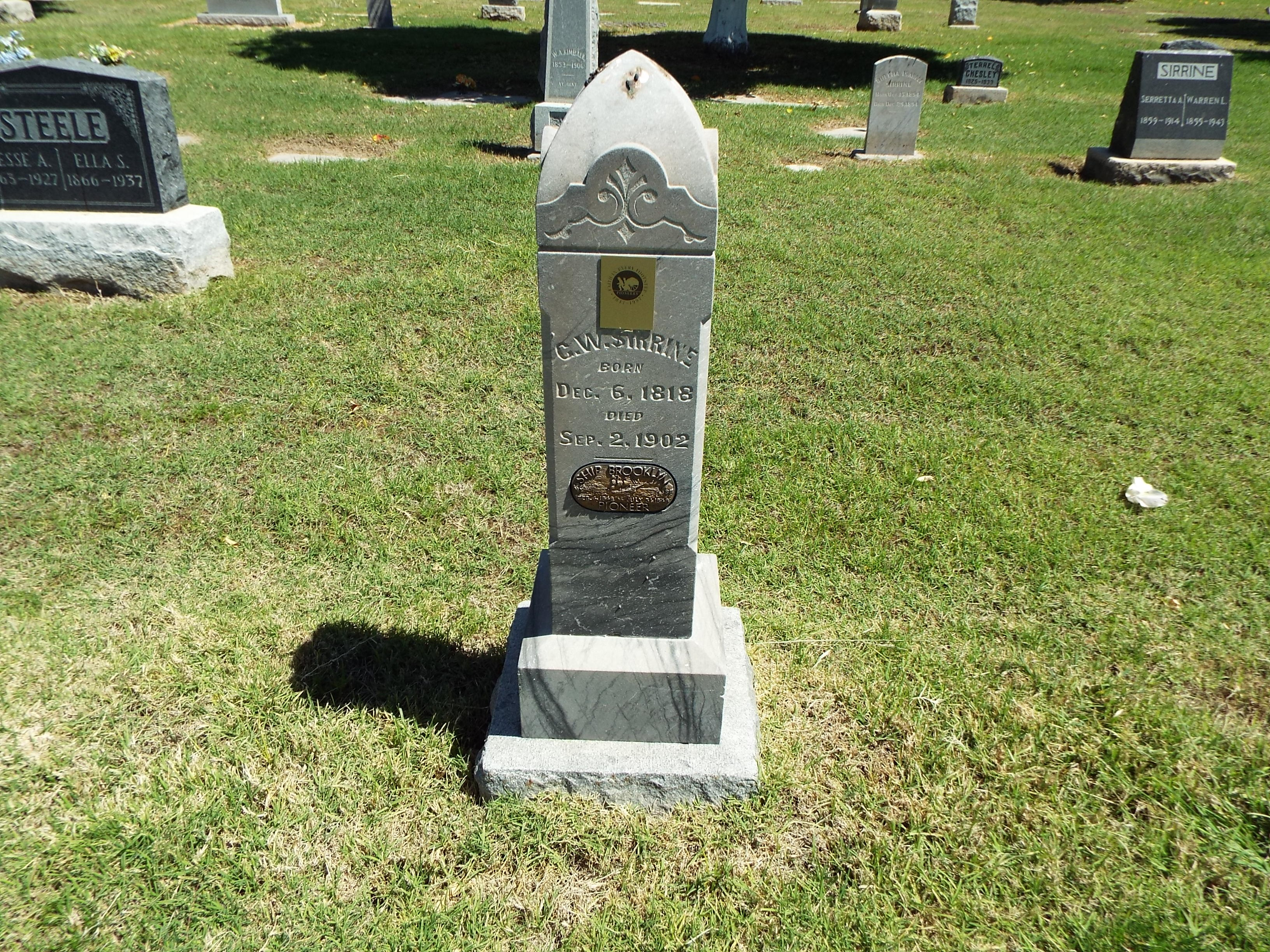
Grave site of George Warren Sirrine, Block #82.

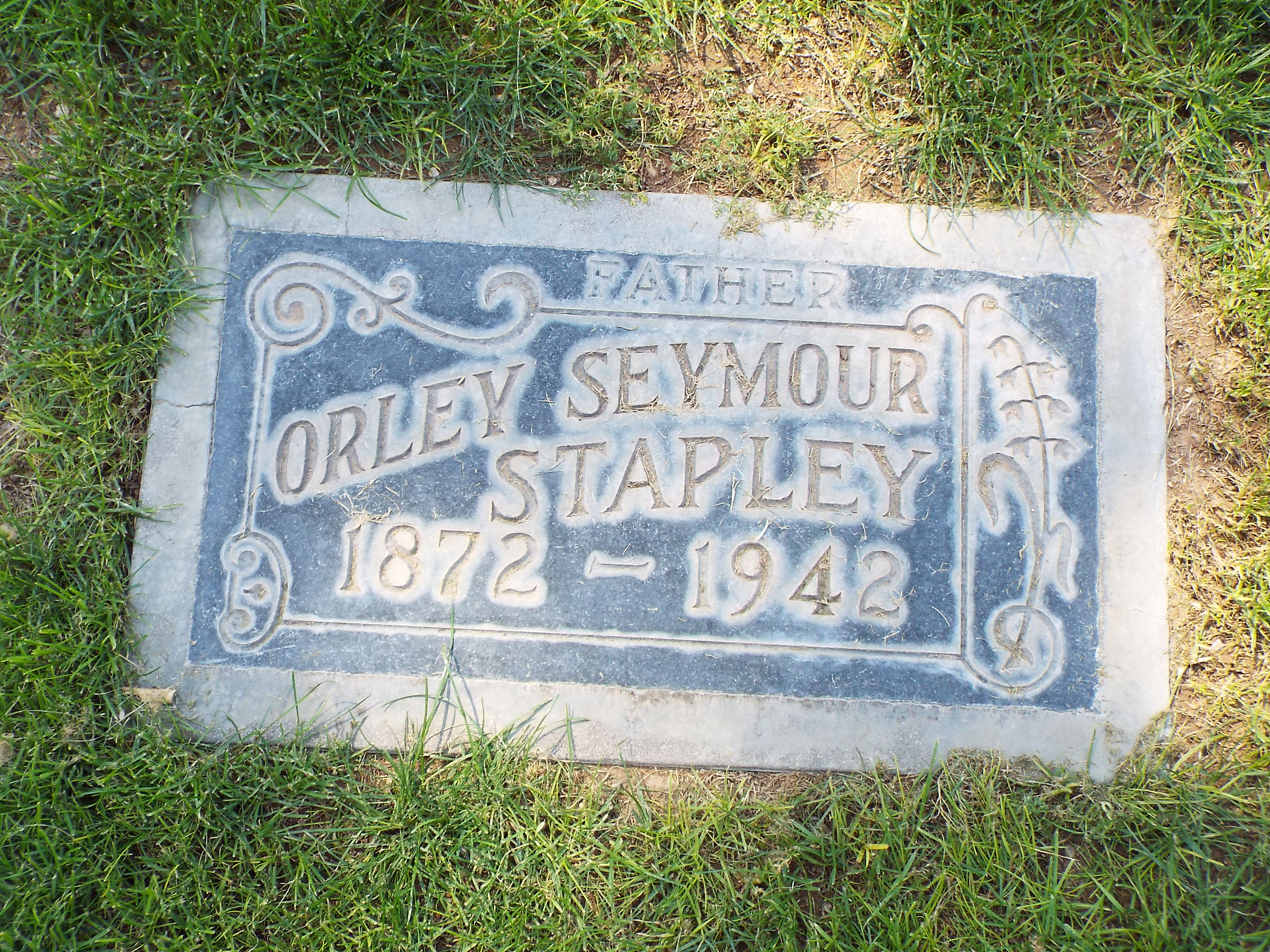
Grave site of Orley Seymour Stapley, Block #476.

== National Register of Historic Places ==
The following houses of the interred are listed in the National Register of Historic Places or listed as historical by the Mesa Historical Society:

- The Sirrine House – Built in 1896 (NRHP) Historic Significance: Architecture/Engineering, Architect, builder, or engineer: Sirrine, Joel E., Architectural Style: Queen Anne, Area of Significance: Architecture, Period of Significance: 1900–1924, 1875–1899.
- The Dr. Lucius Charles Alston House – Built in 1920 (NRHP). The Dr. Lucius Charles Alston House is associated with the history of the development of the African American community in Mesa. The house served as Dr. Alston's office while practicing medicine in Mesa.
- The Ramon Garcia Mendoza House – Built in 1944 and is located at 126 N. Pomeroy Lane. Ramon Garcia Mendoza was the first Hispanic Chief of Police in Mesa. He became a police officer in a time when segregation was still practiced in the city. Mendoza was appointed police chief in 1969 and served until his retirement in 1978. It is listed in the Mesa Historic Property Register.
Historic houses in Mesa, Arizona
(NRHP = National Register of Historic Places)
(MHP = Mesa Historic Properties)
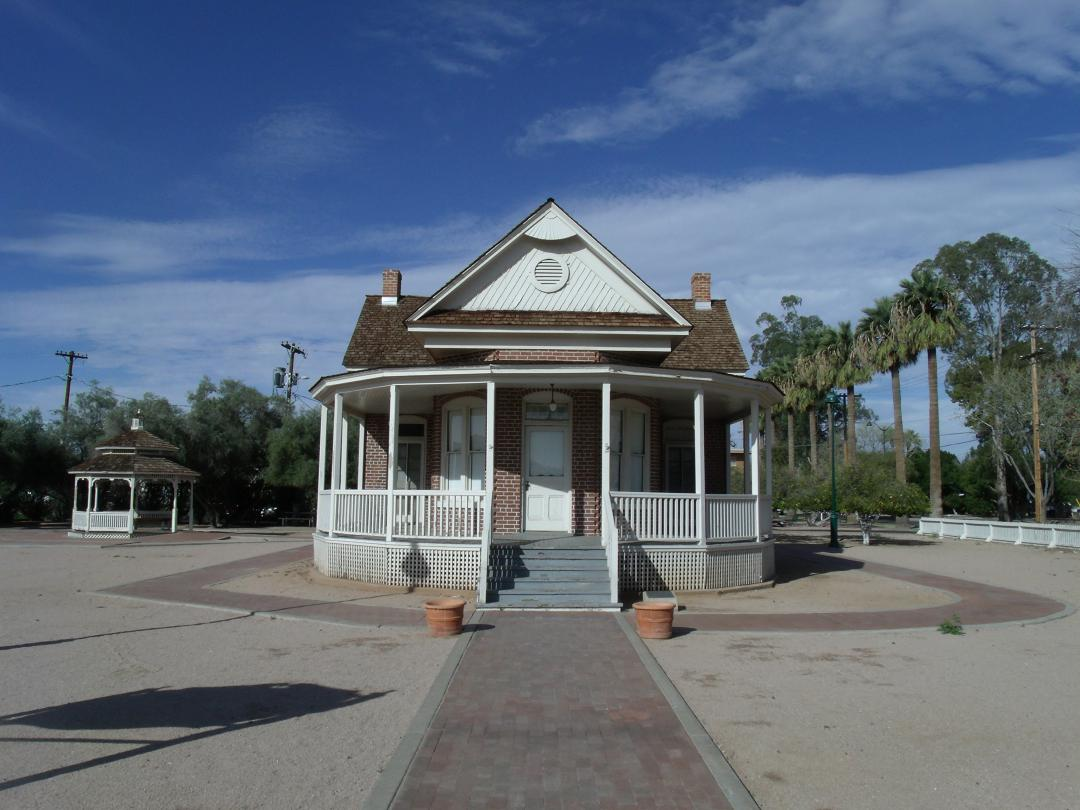
The Sirrine House

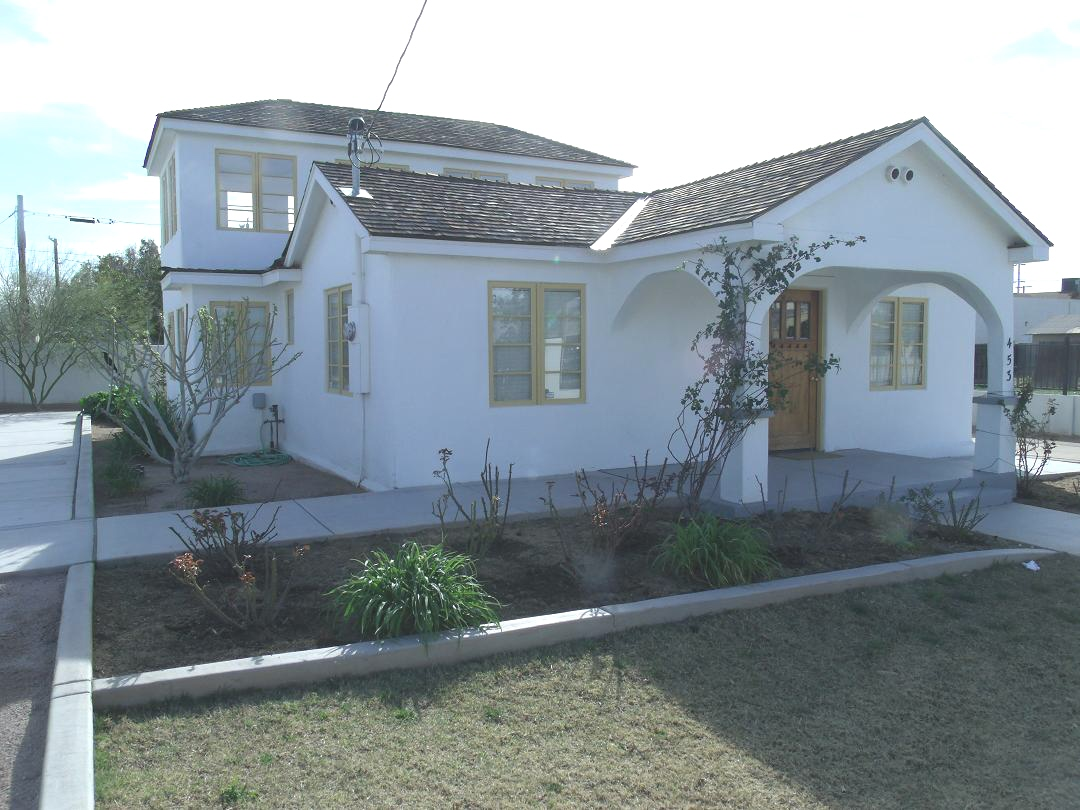
The Dr. Lucius Charles Alston House

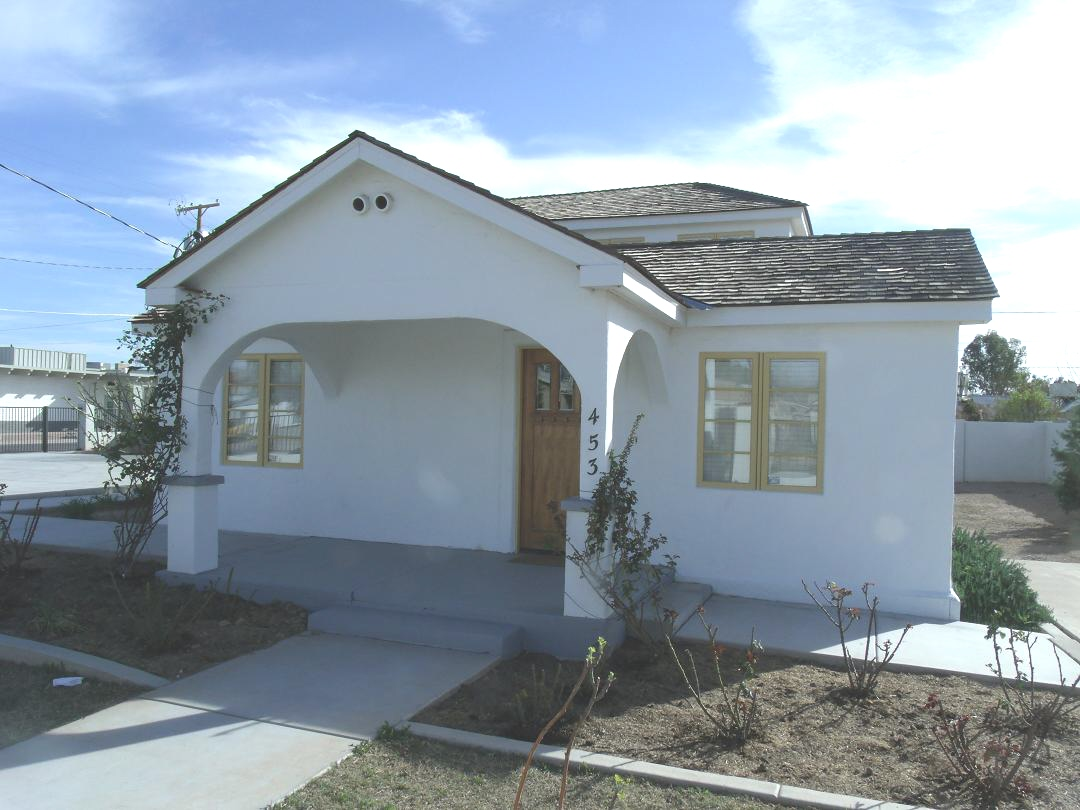
Different view of the Dr. Lucius Charles Aston House

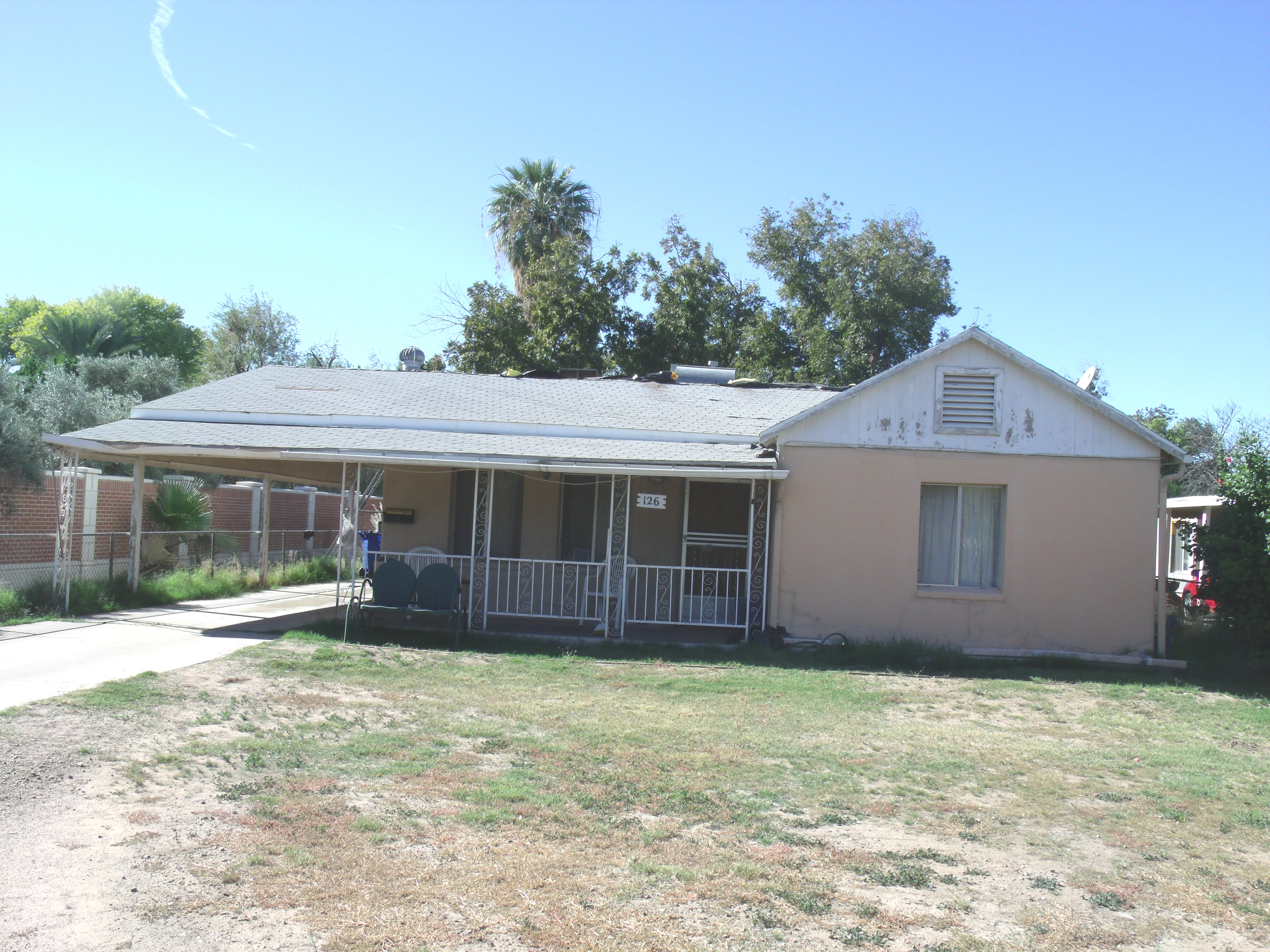
The Ramon Garcia Mendoza House

== See also ==
- Adamsville A.O.U.W. Cemetery
- Home Mission Cemetery
- Glendale Memorial Park Cemetery
- Pioneer and Military Memorial Park
- Goodyear Farms Historic Cemetery
- Double Butte Cemetery
- Greenwood/Memory Lawn Mortuary & Cemetery
- St. Francis Catholic Cemetery
- Historic Pinal Cemetery
