= Mayor Goodman =

Mayor Goodman may refer to numerous mayors:

== United States ==
- Carolyn Goodman (born 1939), American politician, 22nd mayor of Las Vegas, Nevada from 2011 to 2024
- George Nicholas Goodman (1895–1959), American pharmacist, mayor of Mesa, Arizona from 1938 to 1942, 1946 to 1948, 1952 to 1956
- Oscar Goodman (born 1939), American attorney and politician, 21st mayor of Las Vegas, Nevada from 1999 to 2011
- Philip H. Goodman (1914–1976), American politician, 42nd mayor of Baltimore, Maryland from 1962 to 1963

== United Kingdom ==
- George Goodman (politician) (1791–1869), English wool-stapler and politician, 1st mayor of Leeds, England in 1836 and 1847
