= Jeffrey Max Jones =

Mexican politician

Jeffrey Max Jones (born 25 April 1958) is a Mexican politician.

He graduated from Brigham Young University in International Relations in 1982. He is a member of the Church of Jesus Christ of Latter-day Saints and the National Action Party (PAN) of Mexico since 1995. He served in the Chamber of Deputies from 1997 to 2000, representing Chihuahua's first district. He was then elected as a member of the Senate in the year 2000, representing the state of Chihuahua. He served as president of the Border Affairs committee and member of the agriculture and agrarian reform committees. His six-year term expired in 2006 since there is no immediate reelection for senators in Mexico.

Jones served from 2006 to 2009 as Undersecretary of Agribusiness Development with the Secretariat of Agriculture and Rural Development and focused on three areas: prospective planning, market development, and finance. In 2009, he caused controversy by stating in a public statement that Mexican farmers should learn from drug traffickers how to run their businesses. After that, he resigned from his position.

Jones was born and grew up in Colonia Dublán, Nuevo Casas Grandes, northwestern Chihuahua, and lives in the birth home of former Governor of Michigan George W. Romney. He is bilingually fluent in English and Spanish, and the triple-great grandson of Daniel Webster Jones, an influential early settler of Utah and the Arizona Territory.
