= Daniel Webster Jones (Mormon) =

American Mormon pioneer (1830–1915)

Personal details
- Born: August 26, 1830; Howard County, Missouri
- Died: April 20, 1915 (aged 84); Mesa, Arizona
- Resting place: City of Mesa Cemetery; 33.4384°N 111.8329°W
- Notable works: Forty Years Among the Indians (autobiography)
- Spouse(s): Harriet Emily Colton
- Children: 14
- Relatives: Fay Wray (grand-daughter); Jeffrey M. Jones
- Signature

Daniel Webster Jones (August 26, 1830 – April 20, 1915) was an American and Mormon pioneer. He was the leader of the group that colonized what eventually became Mesa, Arizona, made the first translation of selections of The Book of Mormon into Spanish, led the first Mormon missionary expedition into Mexico, dealt frequently with the American Indians, and was the leader of the group that wintered at Devil's Gate during the rescue of the stranded handcart companies in 1856. It is, in part, due to Jones’ efforts that there is a substantial population of Latino Mormons in Mexico, the United States, and Brazil.

== Early life ==
Jones was born August 26, 1830, in Booneslick, Howard County, Missouri. Orphaned at the age of 12, he joined a group of volunteers to fight in the Mexican–American War in 1847. Following the war, he remained in Mexico for a number of years, learning Spanish, and while taking "part in many ways in the wild, reckless life that was common in that land," still he longed for something. When a sheepherding expedition bound for California departed in 1850, he left with them.

== Latter-day Saint Movement ==
While camped along the Green River in 1850, his pistol went off in his holster, piercing through fourteen inches of his groin and thigh. His companions left him, lame, but alive, with a Mormon settlement in Provo. There, he studied Mormon doctrine and was baptized by Isaac Morley on January 27, 1851. The next year, he married Harriet Emily Colton, daughter of Philander and Polly Colton.

In the October 1856 General Conference of the Church of Jesus Christ of Latter-day Saints, Church President Brigham Young informed those gathered that a group of Latter-day Saint immigrants were then stranded on the plains of Wyoming. These were the Martin and Willie handcart companies, as well as the Hunt and Hodgett wagon companies. The next day, about 25 men departed from the Salt Lake Valley to find the immigrants.

The company found the Willie Handcart Company near South Pass. After reaching Devil's Gate, they still hadn't found the other groups, and Jones, Joseph A. Young, and Abe Garr were sent ahead to find the missing parties and help them in to the Devil's Gate area. After assisting them to a spot now known as Martin's Cove, it was determined that Jones, Thomas Alexander, and Ben Hampton would remain behind with the goods cached at Fort Seminoe, together with 17 teamsters detailed from the Hunt and Hodgett wagon companies. During that winter, they endured terrific privations which Jones later detailed in his autobiography.

In 1874, Jones was commissioned by Brigham Young to translate selections from The Book of Mormon into Spanish, in preparation for a missionary expedition into Mexico. This he did, with the assistance of Henry Brizzee and Meliton Trejo, a recent Spanish convert from the Philippines. Following the translation, the company, including James Z. Stewart, Helaman Pratt (son of Parley P. Pratt and father of Rey L. Pratt), Wiley C. Jones (Jones's son), R. H. Smith, Ammon M. Tenney and Anthony W. Ivins (who would later become an Apostle and First Counselor in the First Presidency, departed for Mexico. The mission lasted from 1875 to 1876.

Upon returning, he was commissioned by Brigham Young to start a settlement in the Salt River Valley of Arizona. The settlement party left the Utah Territory from St. George, and arrived at the site in March 1877. Jones' invitation to local Native Americans to live with them became a point of controversy, and half of the initial colony left, moving on to found St. David, Arizona. Originally called Jonesville, the settlement was later renamed Lehi, and was eventually incorporated into Mesa, Arizona.

== Autobiography ==
After some conflict with the other settlers, Jones moved to the Tonto Basin area, where his wife and 14th and youngest child were killed when a shed fell on them during a storm in 1882. In 1890, he published his autobiography, Forty Years Among the Indians: A True yet Thrilling Narrative of the Author's Experiences among the Natives, published by the Juvenile Instructor Press in 1890. In it, Jones details his conversion to the Church of Jesus Christ of Latter-day Saints, his experiences during the rescue of the handcart companies during the winter of 1856, his work with the Native Americans and Mexican people, and the early settlement of what became Mesa, Arizona. It is a valuable resource for historians and storytellers in describing events and conditions in Western and Mormon American history.

== Death ==
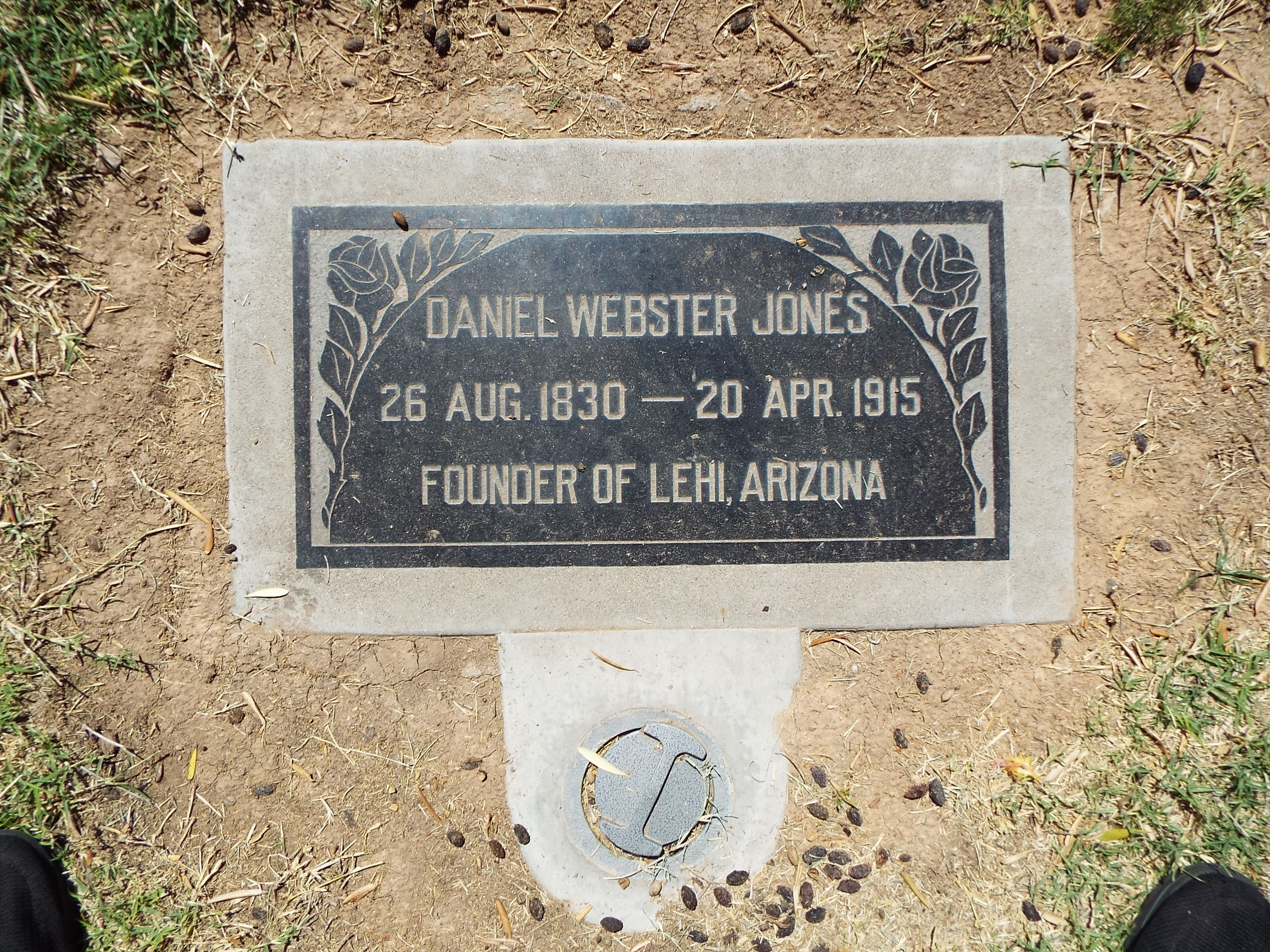
Grave of Daniel Webster Jones

Jones died on April 20, 1915, at the age of 84, of gangrene after an accident, and was buried in the City of Mesa Cemetery.

== Legacy ==
Jones was the grandfather of actress Fay Wray (King Kong (1933)) and father of Daniel Philemon Jones, four-time member of the Arizona House of Representatives, Arizona's Speaker of the House from 1923 to 1924, and member of the Arizona State Senate. He was the great-great-great-grandfather of Jeffrey Jones, the first Mormon senator in Mexico.

== See also ==
- The Church of Jesus Christ of Latter-day Saints in Arizona
