= League of Arizona Cities and Towns =

- Company type: Municipal League
- Founded: Arizona (1937)
- Headquarters: Phoenix, Arizona
- Key people: Mayor Kevin Hartke, President, Tom Belshe, Executive Director, Rene Guillen, Deputy Director, Matthew S. Lore, Deputy Director, Tom Savage, Legislative Director, Nancy L. Davidson, General Counsel
- Website: www.azleague.org

League of Arizona Cities and Towns is a municipal league that provides an important link among the ninety-one incorporated cities and towns in Arizona. The League is the only organization that connects each and every municipality regardless of size or geographic location. The League represents the collective interests of cities and towns at the State Legislature, provides timely information on important municipal issues, creates skill-sharpening workshops and develops networking opportunities.

== History ==
The League of Arizona Cities and Towns was formed in 1937 as the Arizona Municipal League, with a guiding principle that remains the modern League's primary mission - home rule and local determination. In short, home rule and local determination are the beliefs that local decisions are best made by local decision makers and not by officials at some other level of government.

The issue prompting the formation of the League was the Arizona Legislature's reluctance to allow elected city and town officials reasonable discretion in making decisions about their communities. The League's formation was the first step in gaining city and town access to the state legislative process.

But the establishment of the League did not gain immediate acceptance by the State Legislature. There were some "hard times" when the League had to prove itself as an organization.

In 1942, a League-sponsored initiative was passed by the people of the State, securing a 10 percent share of the state sales tax for cities and towns. This successful initiative was met with disapproval by state legislators. A lawsuit was filed, questioning the legitimacy of the League. The Arizona Supreme Court ruled that it was unconstitutional for cities and towns to support the League through payment of dues. The ruling was a serious financial blow to the League. However, a number of mayors throughout Arizona believed that the League was such an important part of local government that they funded the organization out of their own pockets for six years until the Supreme Court reversed its decision.

An early president of the Arizona Municipal League as it was called was Mesa mayor George Nicholas Goodman.

In the meantime, the League sponsored initiatives that resulted in shares of the state gas tax and the state income tax being returned to cities and towns, along with an increased share of state sales tax These initiative drives, backed by the type of determination demonstrated by mayors and councilmembers who themselves funded the League, have made the League a political force representing viable local government.

== Leadership ==
Committee Members

League activities are directed by a 25-member Executive Committee, consisting of mayors and councilmembers from across the state of Arizona.

Committee officers are elected to two-year terms. Committee members are elected to one- or two-year overlapping terms. Members and officers of the Executive Committee are determined by all League members at the League's Annual Conference through a process coordinated by a Nominating Committee.

The current President of the League's Executive Committee is Mayor Kevin Hartke, City of Chandler.

== See also ==
- National League of Cities
- List of state Municipal Leagues
