= George Nicholas Goodman =

American politician (1895–1959)

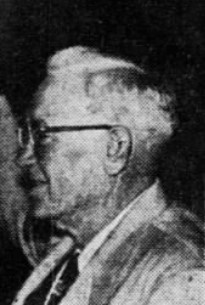

Mayor of Mesa, Arizona
- In office 1938–1942
- Preceded by: Linford B. Werner
- Succeeded by: John A. Hamblin

Mayor of Mesa, Arizona
- In office 1946–1948
- Preceded by: Zebulon Pearce
- Succeeded by: Frank E. Bendick

Mayor of Mesa, Arizona
- In office 1952–1956
- Preceded by: Oscar Virgil Crismon
- Succeeded by: Richard G. Johnson, Sr.

Personal details
- Born: September 5, 1895 St. David, Territory of Arizona, US
- Died: November 3, 1959 (aged 64) Mesa, Arizona
- Resting place: City of Mesa Cemetery
- Party: Civic Progressive
- Spouse: Clara Platt Goodman
- Children: George William Goodman, Clarice Goodman Pomeroy, Harold Richard Goodman OD, Clifford J. Goodman, MD, Sherry Goodman Pew
- Parent(s): George Edward Goodman and Roxsana Othelia Reed Goodman
- Occupation: Pharmacist

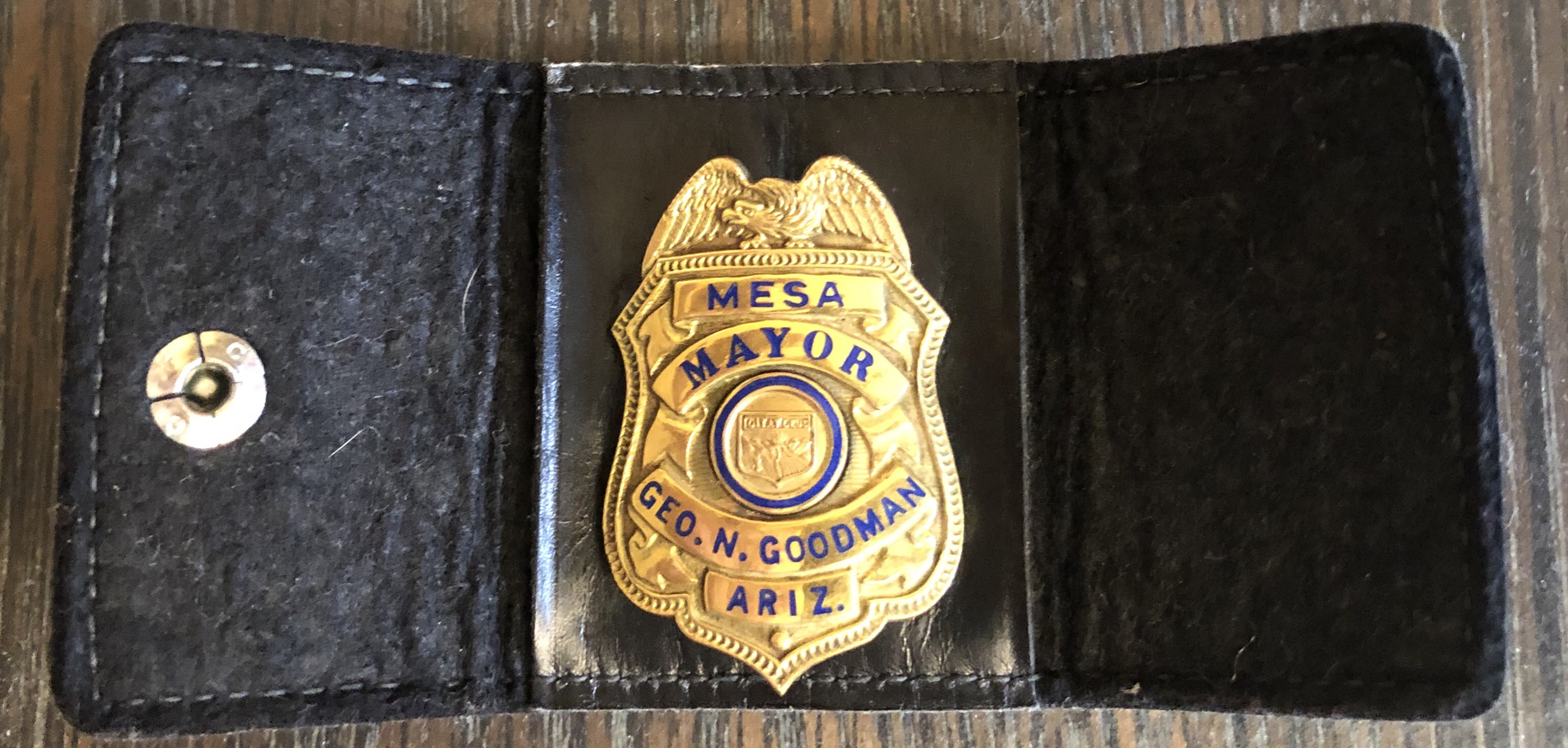

George Nicholas Goodman (September 5, 1895 – November 3, 1959), was a pharmacist in Mesa, Arizona. He was the mayor of Mesa for five different 2-year terms as part of three different decades. Goodman served as the executive secretary of the Arizona State Fair Commission at the time of his death, and was the former president of both the Arizona Pharmaceutical Association (now the Arizona Pharmacy Association) and the Arizona Municipal League (now the League of Arizona Cities and Towns).

== Background ==
Goodman was born in St. David as the oldest of eight children. The family moved to Safford in 1904. On June 30, 1916, George married Clara Platt. Goodman worked at his father-in-law's Arizona drugstores in Pima, Thatcher, and Safford prior to attending pharmacy school in Los Angeles. Clara Platt Goodman and George both took two years to complete pharmacy school and relocated in 1924 to Mesa to open a drugstore in downtown Mesa.

== Personal and family life ==
Goodman was an avid baseball fan, specifically fond of the Chicago Cubs. He was mayor of Mesa when the Cubs started holding Spring Training in Mesa in 1952. His love of baseball extended to him personally playing softball as the mayor.

Those that knew Goodman best described him as "a man of great humility with a Will Rogers type philosophy".

Goodman was an insulin-dependent diabetic who at least one time missed a meeting due to an insulin reaction.

Goodman enjoyed riding his palomino horse whenever time permitted and had a corral at his home on N Grand just north of University.

== Political life ==
Goodman served on the Mesa city council from 1936 to 1948. He ended those 12 years of service when he decided to "retire from politics." Friends persuaded him to run again and he served on the city council from 1952 to 1956. Goodman was popular with the citizens as well as with his fellow councilmen as shown by his five two-year terms as mayor. The people elected the council and the council elected the Mayor.

As mayor of Mesa in 1953 Goodman officially pulled the switch that turned on the new electric streetlight system for downtown. The system replaced one installed in 1922 with twice the lighting at half of the energy cost. The new lights were guaranteed to last 6,000 hours.

While serving as the mayor of Mesa in 1955 he and others on the city council pondered the idea of forming a new county due to frustration they were experiencing with Maricopa County.

In 1956 Goodman's last election effort ended in a recount by Goodman whereupon he lost by one vote. Having served on the Mesa City Council for 16 years and as mayor for ten of those years he clearly earned the admiration and respect of his peers as shown by the presentation of a gold wristwatch to Goodman by his fellow council members. (The attached article, like many others, say that Goodman was mayor for 12 years. Other documentation shows ten years as mayor. Current records and evidence support the latter.)

== Non-elected civic involvement ==
In January 1942, Goodman became a board member of a World War II Rationing Board in Maricopa County which included a "federal appointment making him a regularly constituted agent of the federal government. This board honor was done without pay. In April of 1942, Rationing Board Member and Mayor Goodman visited Washington DC to lobby for construction materials for Mesa.

Goodman served on the board for the Mesa Chamber of Commerce, as part of the Druggist Old Timers Club, and the American Pharmaceutical Association.

Goodman was designated a member of the United States Citizens Service Corps for Arizona on February 21, 1944. According to its handbook "The United States Citizens Service Corps consisted of civilian volunteers who were charged with leading the fight against inefficiency, insecurity and poor health in communities in order to keep the homefront strong during World War II."

Goodman served as the president of the Arizona Pharmaceutical Association (now the Arizona Pharmacy Association) during 1947-1948. Under Goodman's leadership the Association passed two significant resolutions: 1)Resolution to increase the length of the pharmacy course at the University of Arizona from four to five years including one year of pre-pharmacy work. 2) Resolution approved the University of Arizona College of Pharmacy and its courses. The approval was required for the accreditation of schools of pharmacy by the American Council on Pharmacy Education.

Goodman passionately represented Mesa and other municipalities through his involvement with the Arizona Municipal League (now the League of Arizona Cities and Towns). He served as the vice president of "The League" in 1953, and as the president in 1954.

Goodman was appointed executive secretary of the Arizona State Fair Commission in 1956 at an annual salary of $8,400 (equivalent to $77,825.26 in 2018 ). Executive secretary was the highest role and today the title would be president. Goodman died unexpectedly in 1959 while in office. Goodman's appointment came after each of the two immediate proceeding executive secretaries resigned, one holding the office for only two weeks. Both of those men were compensated $1,800 a year more than Goodman.

According to a eulogy given at Goodman's funeral, he served as a Red Cross Chairman.

Goodman was a member of the Mesa Rotary Club, the Southside Sheriff's Posse, the Maricopa County Sheriff's Posse, and the B.P.O. Elks Lodge in Mesa, Arizona.

== Awards and recognition ==
Goodman was recognized as the Most Valuable Citizen of the Year by Mesa for 1955. This recognition was also called the Man of the Year or the Outstanding Citizen.

According to a eulogy given at Goodman's funeral, he received the Rotarian Citizenship award in 1955.

The League of Arizona Cities and Towns honored Goodman with the recognition of Life Member (highest honor "The League" can give a former member) in 1958.

On June 23, 2019 the Arizona Pharmacy Association (AzPA) recognized Goodman posthumously with the Hall of Fame Award as an “Arizona Pharmacy Pioneer.

== Mesa City Council for terms Goodman served ==
Citizens elected the council to two-year terms and the council elected the mayor from their ranks.

Name	Role	June 1936 Term
L.B. Werner	Mayor	
George N. Goodman	Council	
Luther McAllister	Council	Resigned 1937
Jess Meldrum	Council	
Zeb Pearce	Council	
John C. McPhee	Council	Resigned 1937
George H. Wilbur	Council	
Paul L. Sale	Council	Appointed 1937
Luther McAllister	Council	Appointed 1937
