= Double Butte Cemetery =

Historic cemetery in Maricopa County, Arizona

- U.S. National Register of Historic Places
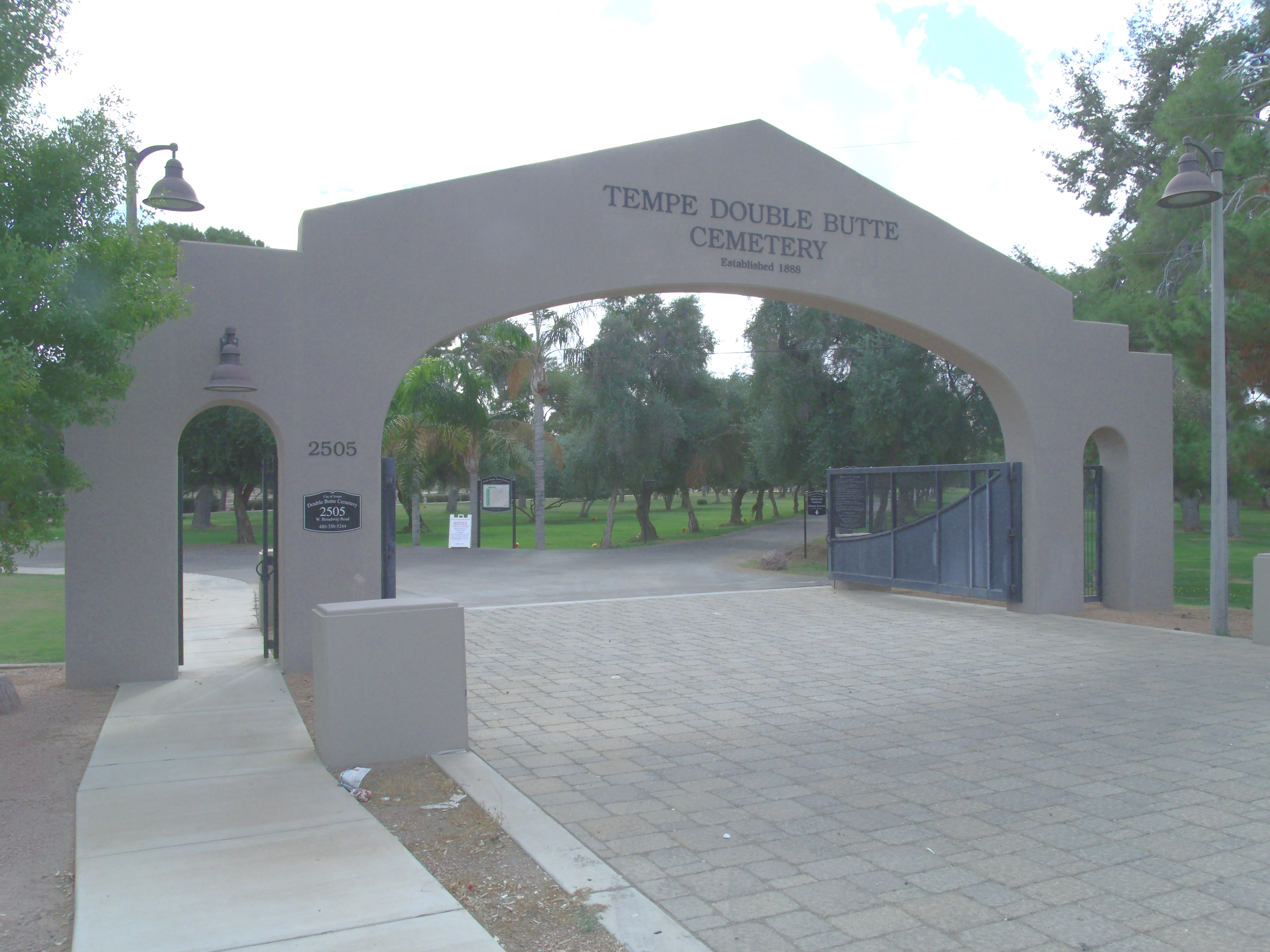
- Main entrance of the Double Butte Cemetery

- Location within Arizona Location within the United States
- Location: 2505 W. Broadway Road, Tempe, Arizona
- Coordinates: 33°24′22″N 111°58′26″W
- Built: 1888
- NRHP reference No.: 13000020
- Added to NRHP: July 30, 2013

The Double Butte Cemetery is the official name given to a historic cemetery in Tempe, Arizona. The cemetery was founded in 1888 on the baseline of the Double Butte Mountain for which it is named. It is the final resting place of various notable pioneers of the City of Tempe. The cemetery, which is located at 2505 W. Broadway Rd., is listed in the Tempe Historic Property Register Designation #46. The pioneer section of the cemetery was listed in the National Register of Historic Places on July 30, 2013, reference #13000020.

== History ==
Many interments, where the present cemetery is located, had already occurred before the official establishment of the cemetery. This fact prompted a group of citizens to form a group called, "Tempe Cemetery Association". The Tempe Cemetery Company, officially established the cemetery on September 13, 1887. The property was donated by Niels Peterson in 1888. Peterson himself was buried there until 1923, when he was exhumed and re-interred in the property where his historic house is located. The location was chosen not only because of its seclusion, since it is situated several miles from the town (Tempe was not considered a "city" at the time) limits, but because the buttes served as a prominent geographical marker. The officers of the Tempe Cemetery Company formed the first corporate entity to administer the cemetery. The first section to be professionally developed by the Tempe Cemetery Company, was the “Pioneer Section” located adjacent to earlier, pre-1897 burials.

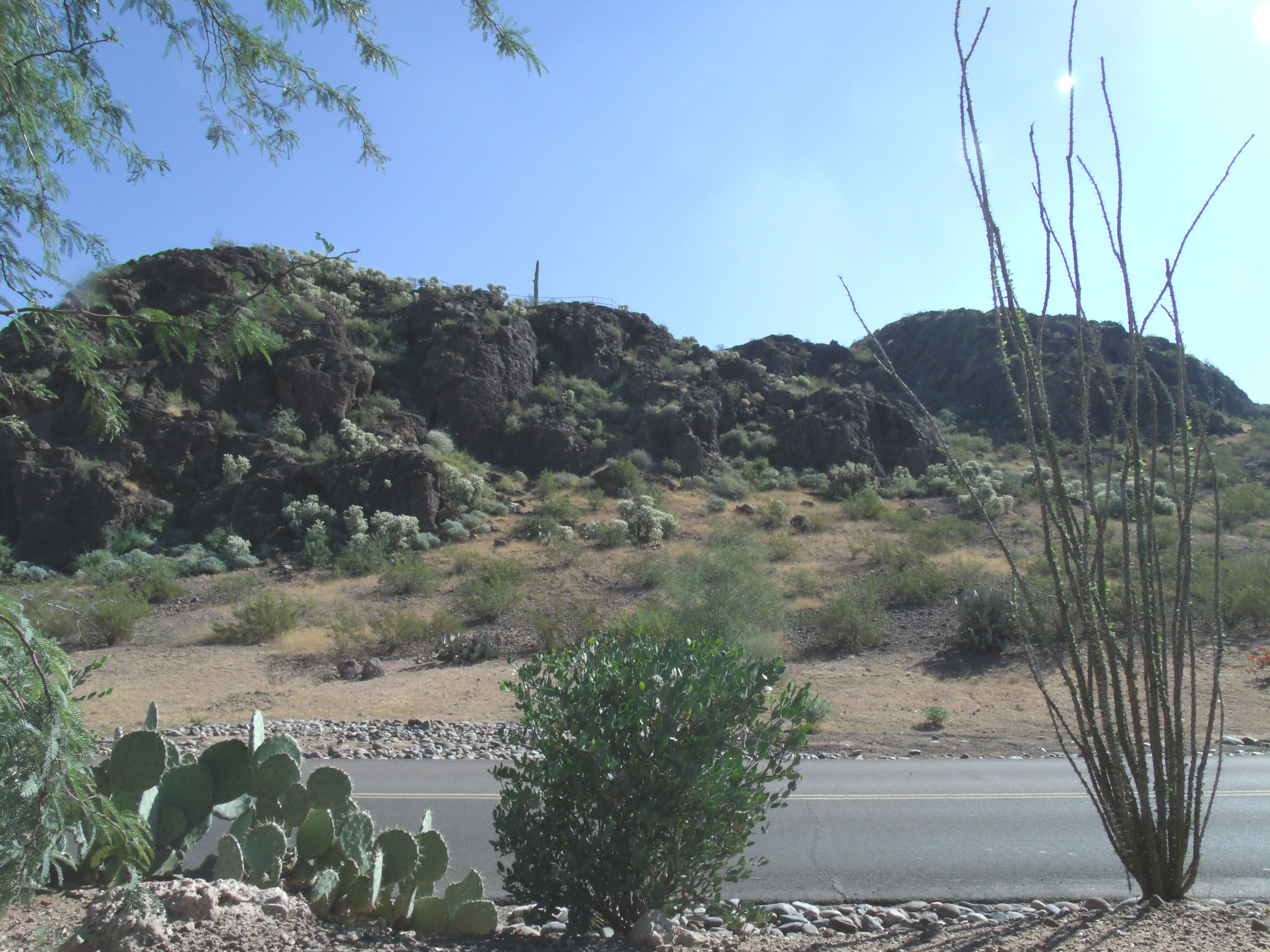
The Double Butte Cemetery is located on the baseline and named after the Double Butte Mountain

For the next decade, Double Butte grew to become Tempe's primary burial place. The economic situation in the 1920s and 30's also had its effects on the cemetery. The Tempe Cemetery Company was in dire financial straits, and the cemetery itself suffered immensely as a result. Many of the graves were sunken and the area around them, such as the trees and grass, began to die because of lack of water and care.

In 1958, the City of Tempe assumed the obligations to operate the cemetery. After sixty years of private, volunteer-organization management, the Tempe Double Butte Cemetery fell under the administration by the City of Tempe. It remains under city ownership and administration to this day.

The Double Butte Cemetery is the final resting place of Charles Trumbull Hayden (founder of Tempe); Carl T. Hayden (Arizona senator, 1927–1969); Benjamin Baker Moeur (Arizona governor, 1932–36); John Howard Pyle (Arizona governor, 1950–54) and U.S. Congressman John Robert Murdock. It is also the final resting place of eleven of Tempe's mayors and of many prominent citizens who quietly played their own respective roles in the community's evolution over the past century and whose houses are listed in the National Register of Historic Places.

The cemetery is located at 2505 W. Broadway Rd. and covers 17 acres (6.8796 hectares). It was listed in the Tempe Historic Property Register Designation with the number 46 in 2012. The pioneer section of the cemetery was listed in the National Register of Historic Places on July 30, 2013, reference #13000020. It is divided into 31 sections. The pioneer sections are listed by letters A to G and the other sections are listed by numbers 1 to 12 and 14 to 23. Then there are the Sunrise Section, which is a lawn covered section; the Sunset Section, which is at the base of the butte next to the Memorial Gardens and the Memorial Gardens section, for the interment of cremated remains.

== Notable interments ==
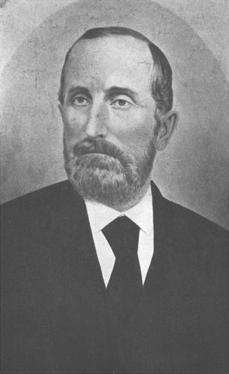
Charles Trumbull Hayden, founder of Tempe

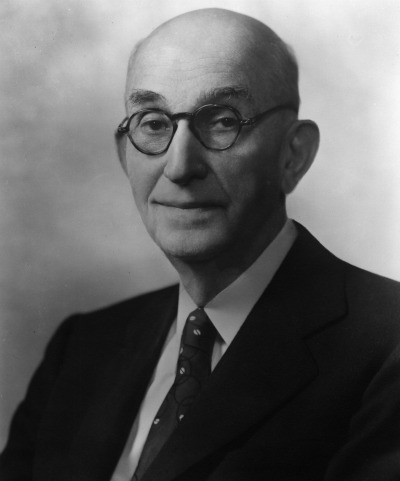
Carl T. Hayden, U.S. Senator

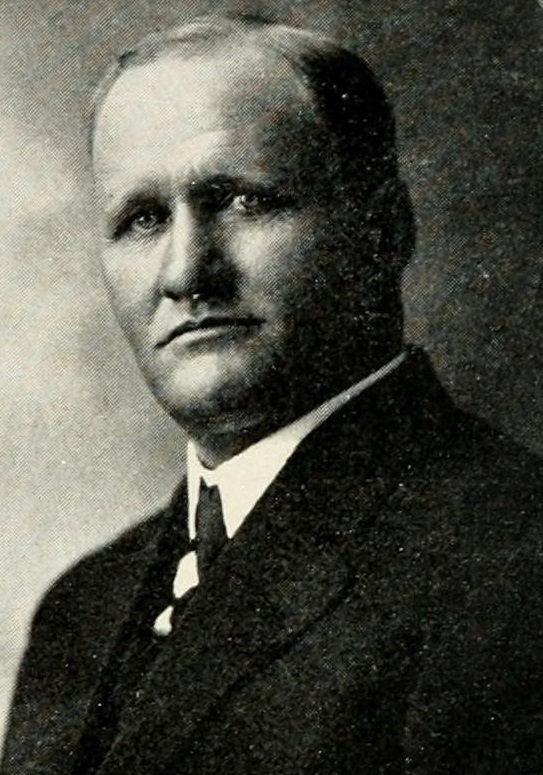
Benjamin Baker Moeur

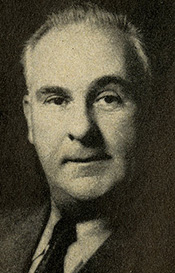
John R. Murdock

Arizona governor J. Howard Pyle nicknamed the cemetery "Tempe's Arlington", on account of the many Tempe notables buried there. Among the notable people who are listed here are the founder of Tempe, two Arizona governors, a United States Senator, a United States Congressman, 5 mayors of Tempe and various prominent pioneers of Tempe.

Pioneer section A

- Curtin “Curt” W. Miller (1864–1943). Miller served as Mayor of Tempe from (1922–1924).

Pioneer section B

- Margaret Cummins (1853–1930) and Aaron Cummins (1840–1919). The Cummins were pioneers who acquired the undeveloped lot 10 of block 1 of the Farmers Addition in 1908. There the family built a house which is listed in the National Register of Historic Places.
- Josephine Frankenberg (?–1949). Frankenberg was a nurse who nursed many victims of the Great Influenza epidemic of 1918, back to health. In 1919 she purchased a house which is listed in the National Register of Historic Places as the Josephine Frankenberg house. She lived in the house until her death in 1949.
- Clyde Harlen Gililland (1899–1968). Gililland served as Mayor of Tempe from (1960–1961).
- Dr. Fenn John Hart (1859–1935). Dr. Fenn John Hart was the first Mayor of Tempe. He served as such from 1894 to 1896.
- Charles Trumbull Hayden (1825–1900). Hayden was the founder of the city of Tempe and the Arizona State University. He is the father of U.S. Senator Carl T. Hayden
- Carl Hayden (1877–1972). Hayden was the first United States Senator to serve seven terms. He served as Arizona's first representative for eight terms before entering the Senate, Hayden set the record for longest serving member of the United States Congress more than a decade before his retirement from politics.
- Cyrus Grant Jones (?–1926). After Jones moved to Tempe he became the first president of the Tempe National Bank.
- John Knight (1854–1904). Knight served as Mayor of Tempe from (1897–1902).
- Albert E. Miller (1859–1909). Albert was the son of Tempe pioneer Winchester Miller. He was a founding member of the Tempe National Bank.
- Winchester Miller (?–1893). Miller was a pioneer who made his home in Tempe. He was a former soldier in the Confederate Army of the United States who moved to Arizona after the American Civil War ended. Within a few years he had one of the most prosperous farms in the Valley. He was president of the Tempe Irrigating Canal Company and served as Maricopa County Sheriff in the 1870s and 80s. He was also a trustee of the Tempe School District # 3.
- James T. Priest (1835–1903). Priest established the first farm in the western area of Tempe. He was actively involved in the development of Tempe. Priest was one of the donors that helped purchase land for a site for the Territorial Normal School in 1885. He also helped raise money to build the towns St. Mary's Catholic Church.

Pioneer section C

- Charlotte Josephine Mullen Goodwin (1884–1973). Charlotte was a pioneer and widow of Garfield Abram Goodwin. Her house is listed in the National Register of Historic Places.
- Garfield Abram Goodwin (1880–1944). In 1907, Goodwin owned a curio store which was located in a building which he built in Mill Ave. and which is known as the Goodwin Building. He served in various civil service positions in Tempe such as head of the Tempe Beach Committee, Secretary of the Arizona State teachers College Board of Education and as mayor of Tempe from 1924 to 1926.
- Lowell Edward Redden (1865–1944). Redden was a pioneer and farmer in Tempe. His house is listed in the National Register of Historic Places.

Pioneer section D

- Charles Henry Waterhouse (1861–1952). Waterhouse, together with Estmer W. Hudson, introduced in Arizona the new Egyptian cotton, commonly known as Pima cotton. In 1912, he was elected president of Salt River Valley Cotton Growers Association. In 1914, he helped organize the Tempe Cotton Exchange and built Tempe's first cotton gin He was also the president of the Arizona Cotton Growers Association from 1915 to 1919.
- Columbus H. Gray (1833–1905) and Mary A. Gray (1846–1936). The Grays were the first permanent settlers on the north side of the Salt River Valley. C.H. Gray was a member of the legislature. Mrs. Gray claimed to have been the first “white” woman in the valley, a claim which was highly disputed by Trinidad Swilling, wife of Jack Swilling the founder of Phoenix. Mrs. Swilling was born in Mexico of Spanish descent. The Swilling's founded Phoenix in 1867. The Grays moved to Phoenix in 1868.

Pioneer section E

- William Wesley Cole (1902–1961). Cole served as Mayor of Tempe from (1937–1948).
- Roy Martin Hackett (1877–1945). Hackett was a pioneer who owned what is now the oldest fired brick building in Tempe. The building is listed in the National Register of Historic Places in 1974, reference #74000458.

Section 2

- Hugh E. Laird (1882–1970). Laird was the 12th and 15th elected Mayor of Tempe. He served two terms as such. The first term was from 1928 to 1930 and the second term was from 1948 to 1960.

Section 4

- Benjamin Baker Moeur (1869–1937). Moeur was the 4th Governor of Arizona (Arizona Governor, 1932–1936).
- John Howard Pyle (1906–1987). Pyle was the 9th Governor of Arizona (Arizona Governor, 1950–1954).
- Byron Alton Redden (1871–1939). Byron was a rancher and served as zanjero (irrigation canal manager) for 25 years. Redden bought the house, which was built in 1918, in 1920. The house is listed in the National Register of Historic Places.
- Benjamin Harrison Scudder (1871–1936). The Scudders moved from Indiana to Tempe, Arizona. Benjamin Scudder became a school teacher and eventually was elected to the City Council. Both he and his wife are credited with the development of affordable housing in the region. Two of their houses are listed in the National Register of Historic Places.

Section 6

- Don Juan Frankenberg (1873–1952). Don Juan Frankenberg was a member of the pioneer Frankenberg family who were ranchers in the Tempe area in 1888. In 1915 he was selected to experiment with the Pima Long Staple Cotton as part of the program with the Government Experimental Farm at Sacaton, Arizona. Frankenberg was civic-minded, serving as president of Tempe Union High School and as Trustee of the Tempe Board of Education during the 1920s.

Section 7

- Thanks A. Anderson (1889–1974). Anderson was the vice-president of the Tempe National Bank and served two terms as Mayor of Tempe. The first term was from 1930 to 1932 and the second term from 1934 to 1937.
- Joseph Thomas Birchett (1875–1953). Birchett was the director of the Tempe National Bank. He served as Mayor of Tempe from 1912 to 1914. His house is listed in the National Register of Historic Places.
- Frederick Diefenderfer (1873–1954). Diefenderfer was a pioneer in Tempe. He acquired an undeveloped lot in block 5 of the Farmer's Addition in Tempe. There he built a house which is now listed in the National Register of Historic Places.
- James Lee Felton (1874–1932). Felton served as Mayor of Tempe from (1926–1928).
- Estmer W. Hudson (1881–1972). Hudson was instrumental in developing a local cotton industry. In 1920, the California Department of Agriculture dubbed him the "father of cotton" in Arizona.It was Hudson who experimented with a more durable variety of Egyptian cotton, which was introduced in the region as a more disease-resistant strain than grown in the Southeastern states. By 1916, Hudson had successfully developed a new cotton – Pima, an improved strain of Yuma, produced from a hybrid Egyptian cotton. His house is listed in the National Register of Historic Places.
- Forest Egbert Ostrander (1877–1945). Ostrander served as Mayor of Tempe from 1920 to 1922.

Section 9

- John Robert Murdock (1885–1972) was a U.S. Representative from Arizona.

== Graves ==
Notable people buried in the historic Double Butte Cemetery
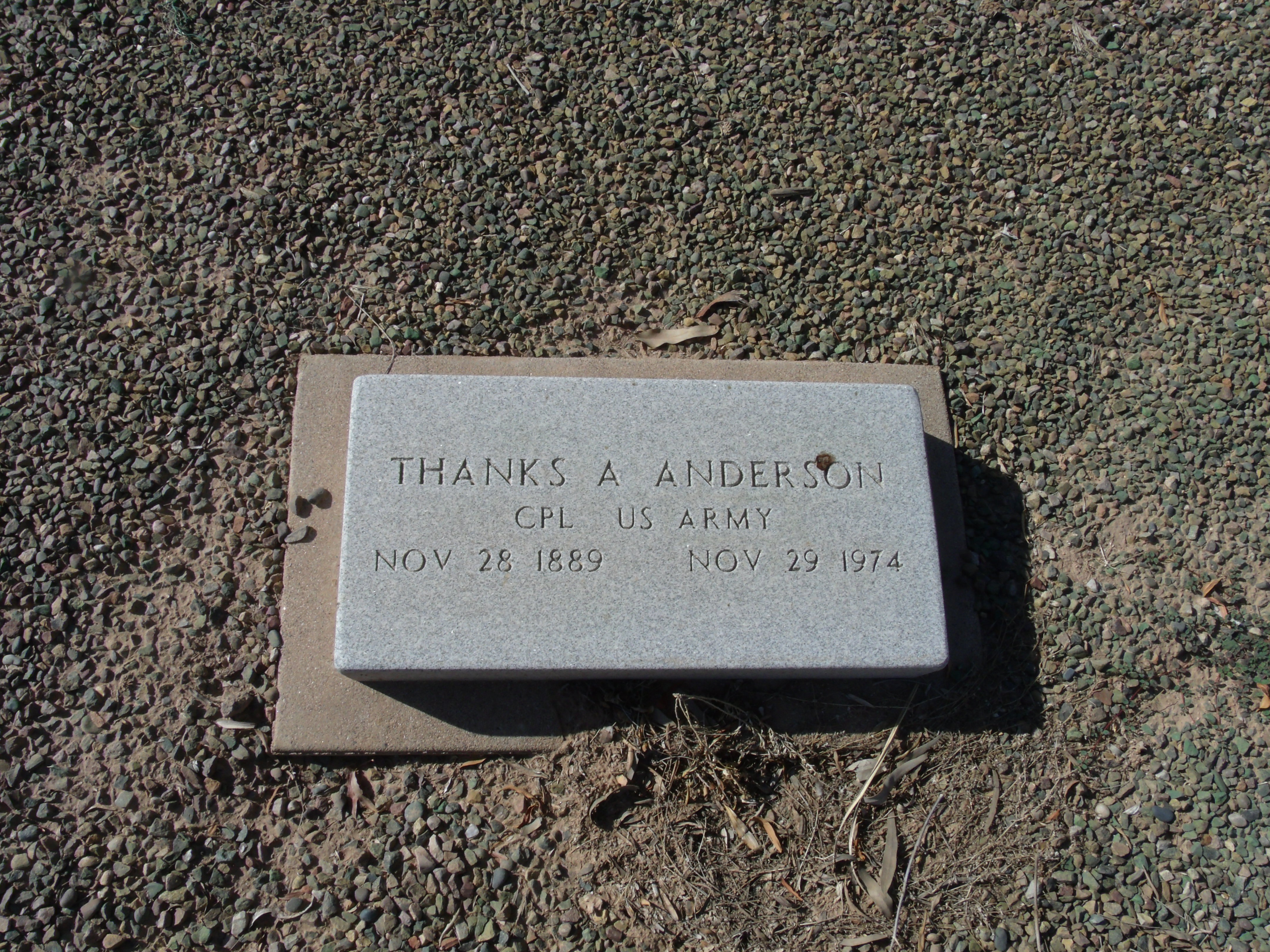
The grave site of Thanks A. Anderson (1889–1974).

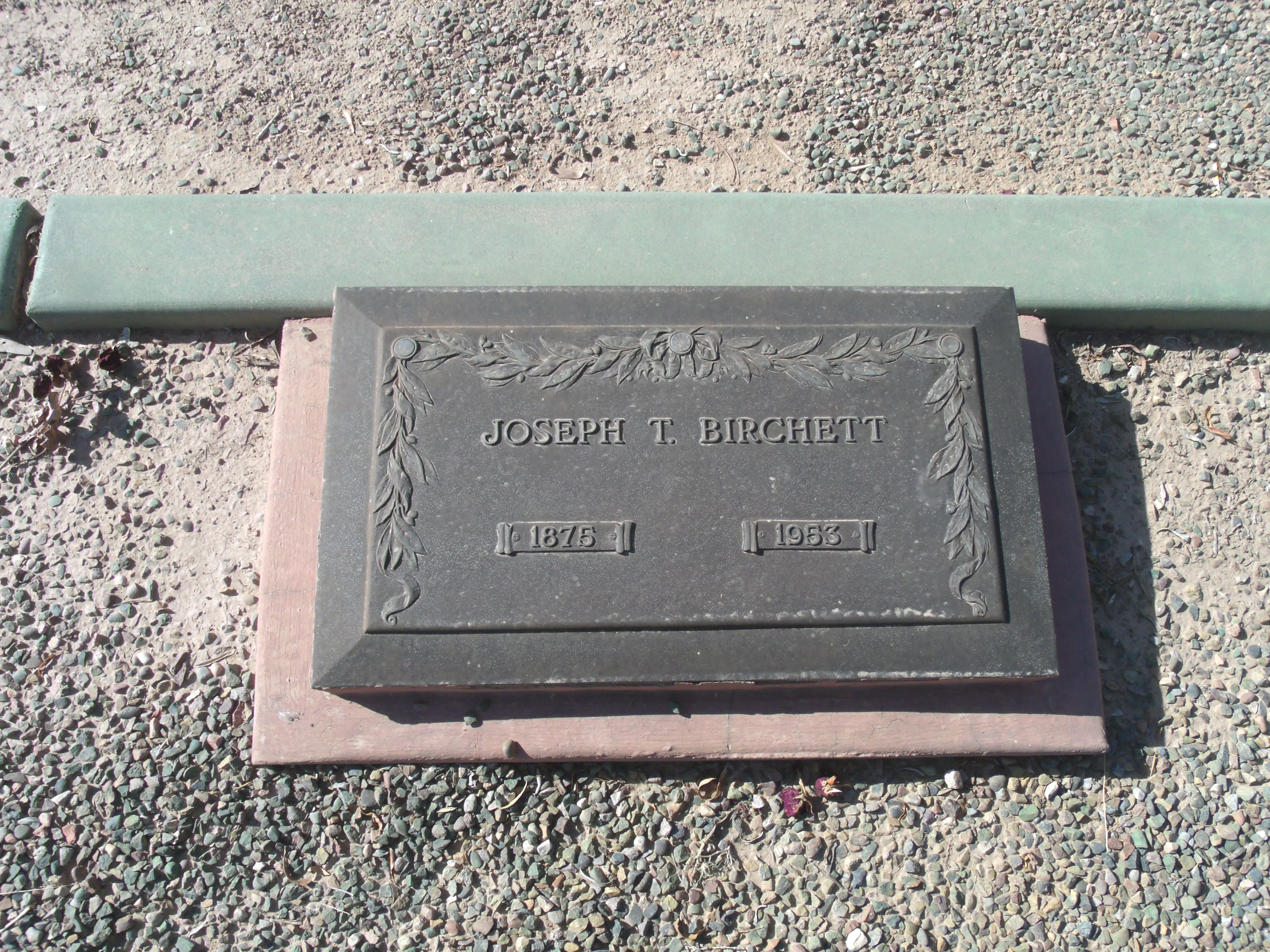
The grave site of Joseph Thomas Birchett (1875–1953).

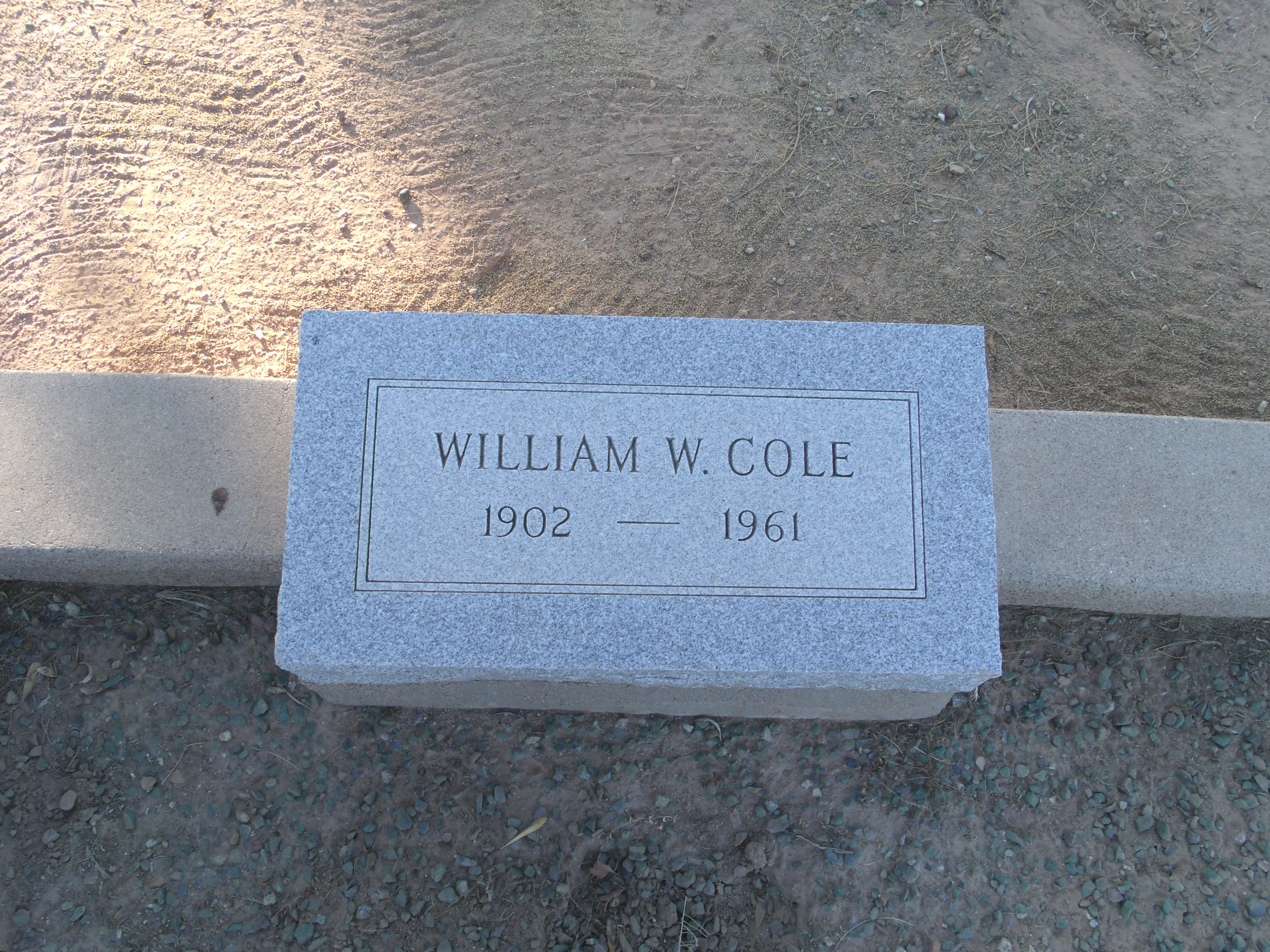
The grave site of William Wesley Cole (1902–1961).

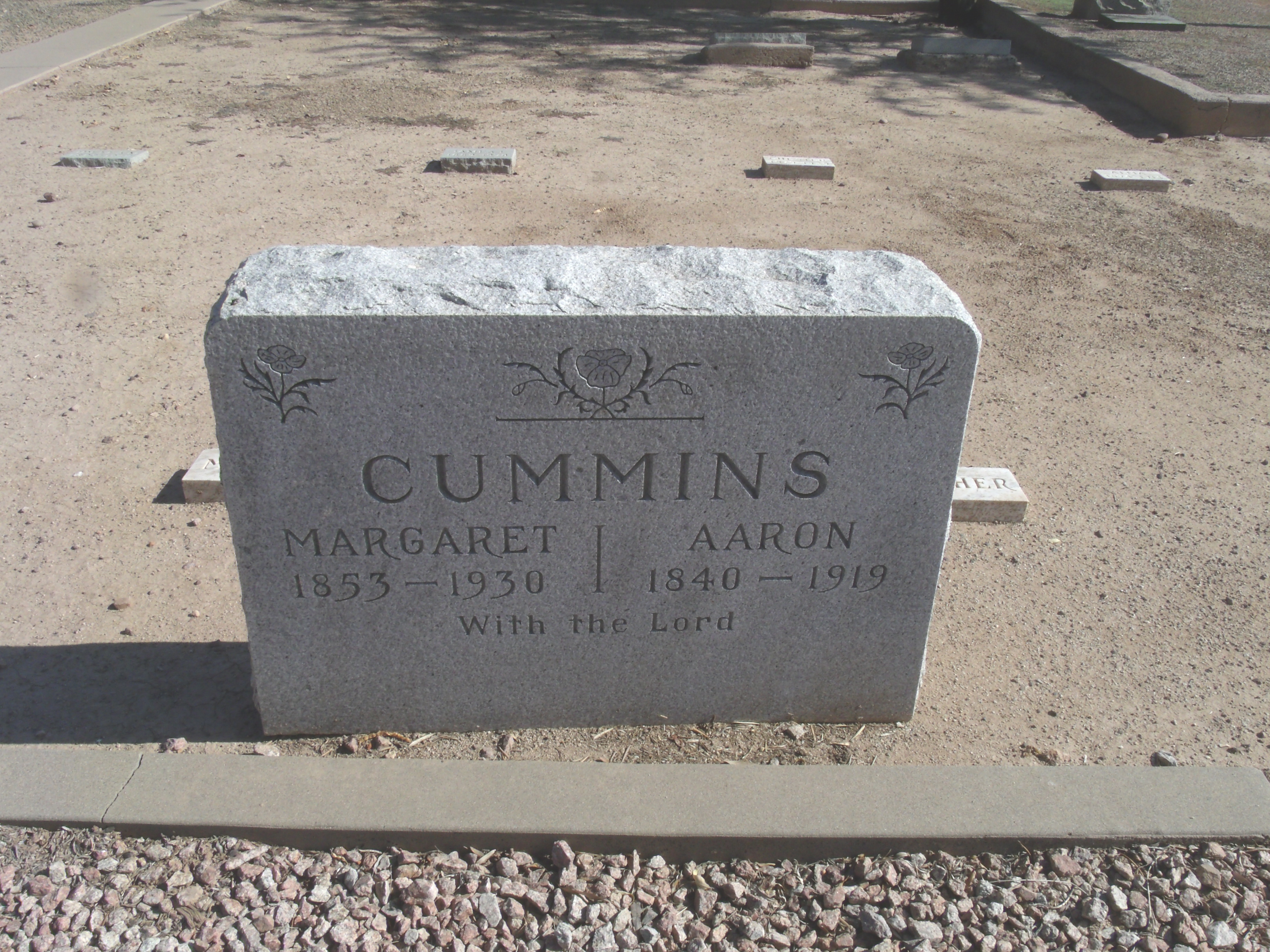
The grave site of Margaret Cummins (1853–1930) and her husband Aaron Cummins (1840–1919).

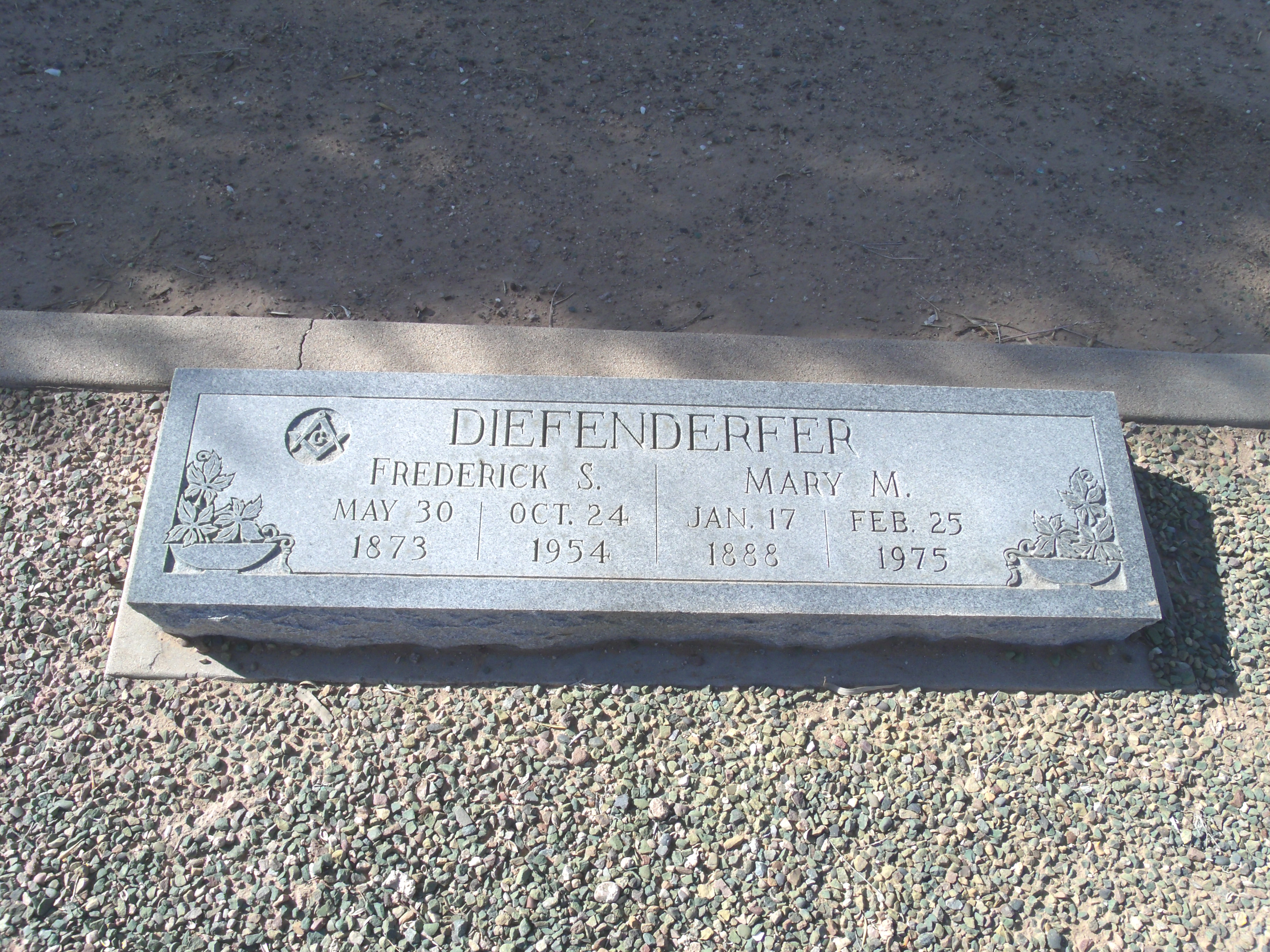
The grave site of Frederick Diefenderfer (1873–1954) and his wife Mary M. Diefenderfer (1888–1975).

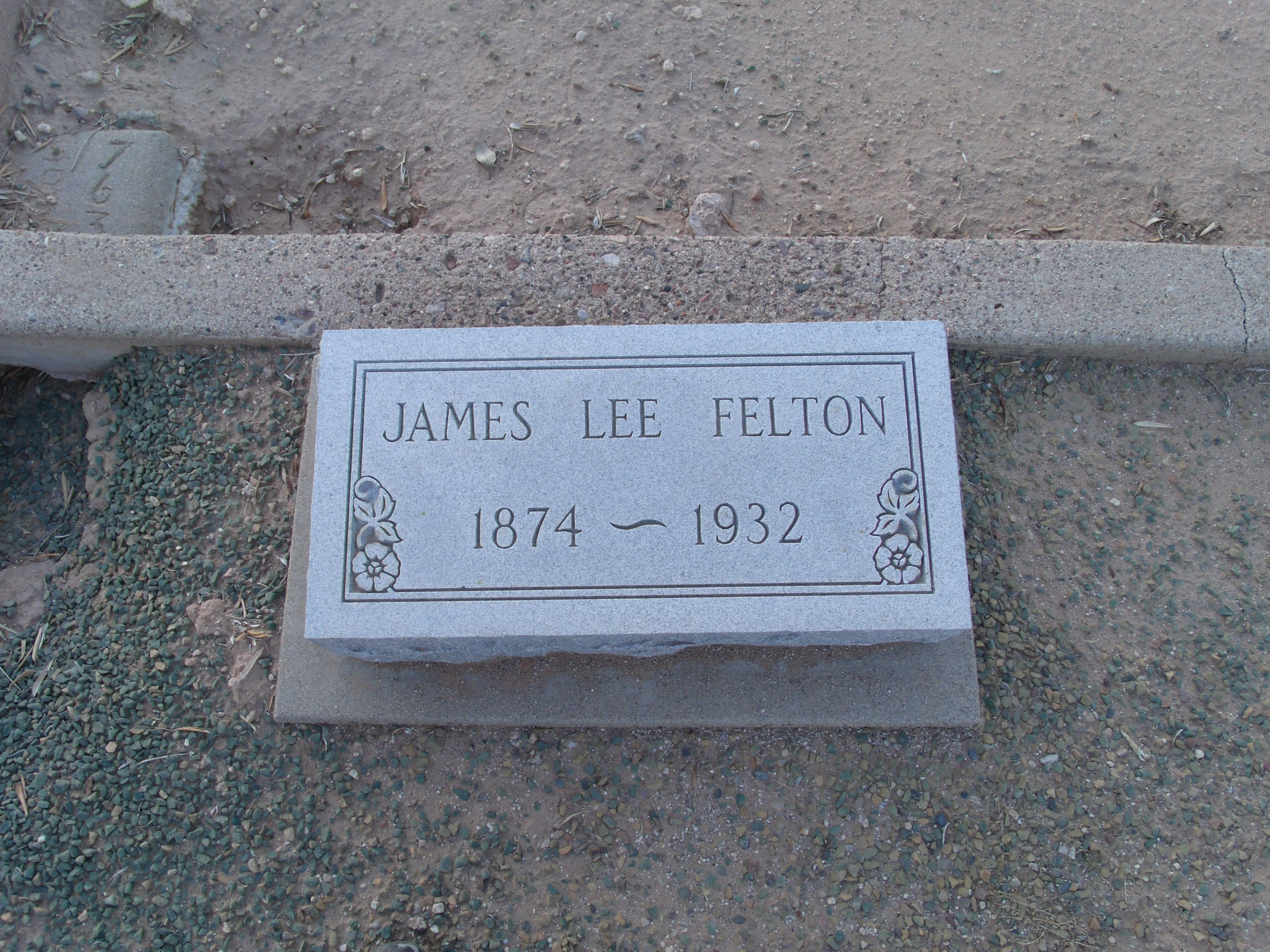
The grave site of James Lee Felton (1874–1932).

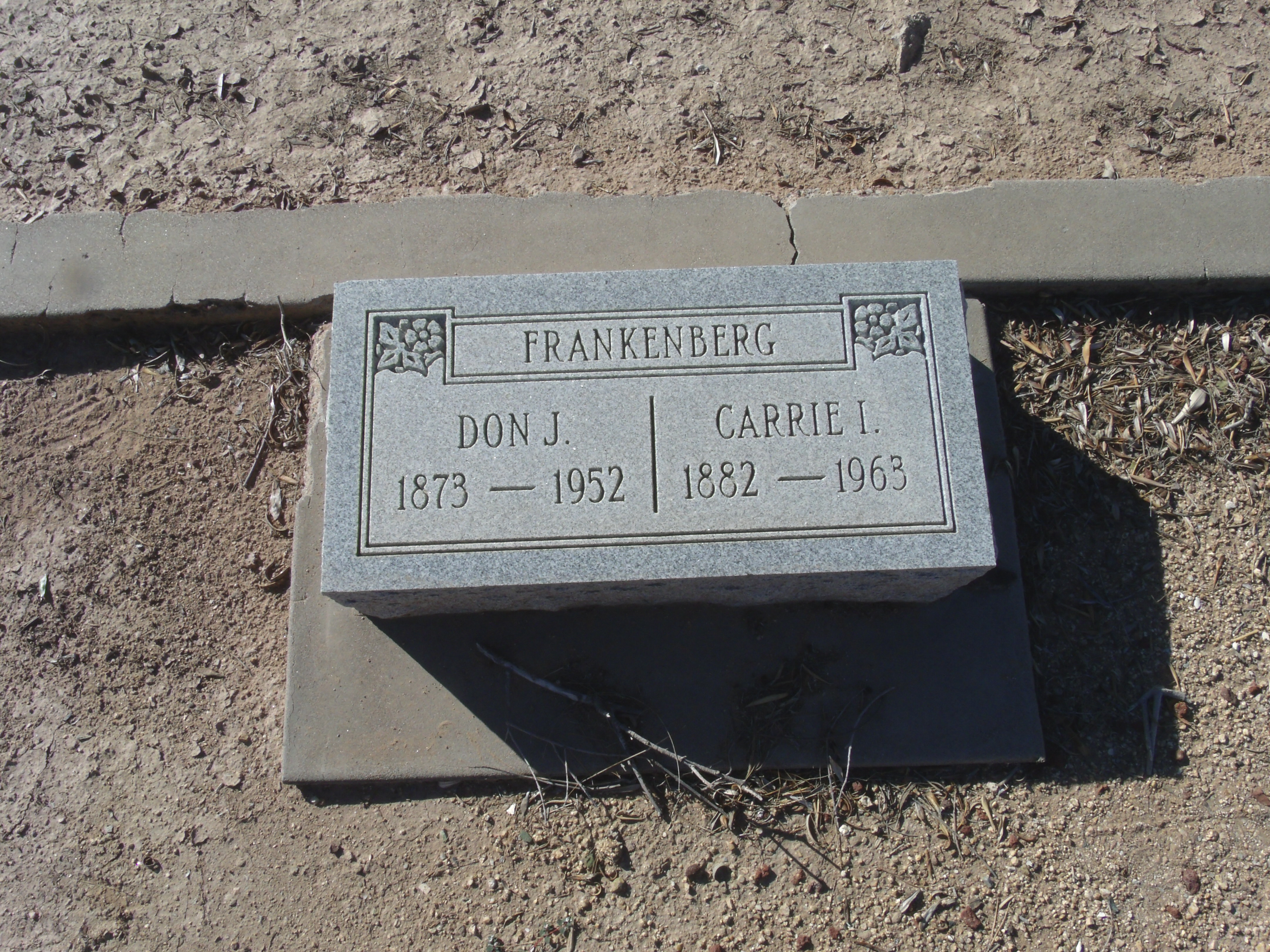
The grave site of Don Juan Frankenberg (1873–1952) and his wife Carrie I. Frankenberg (1882–1963).

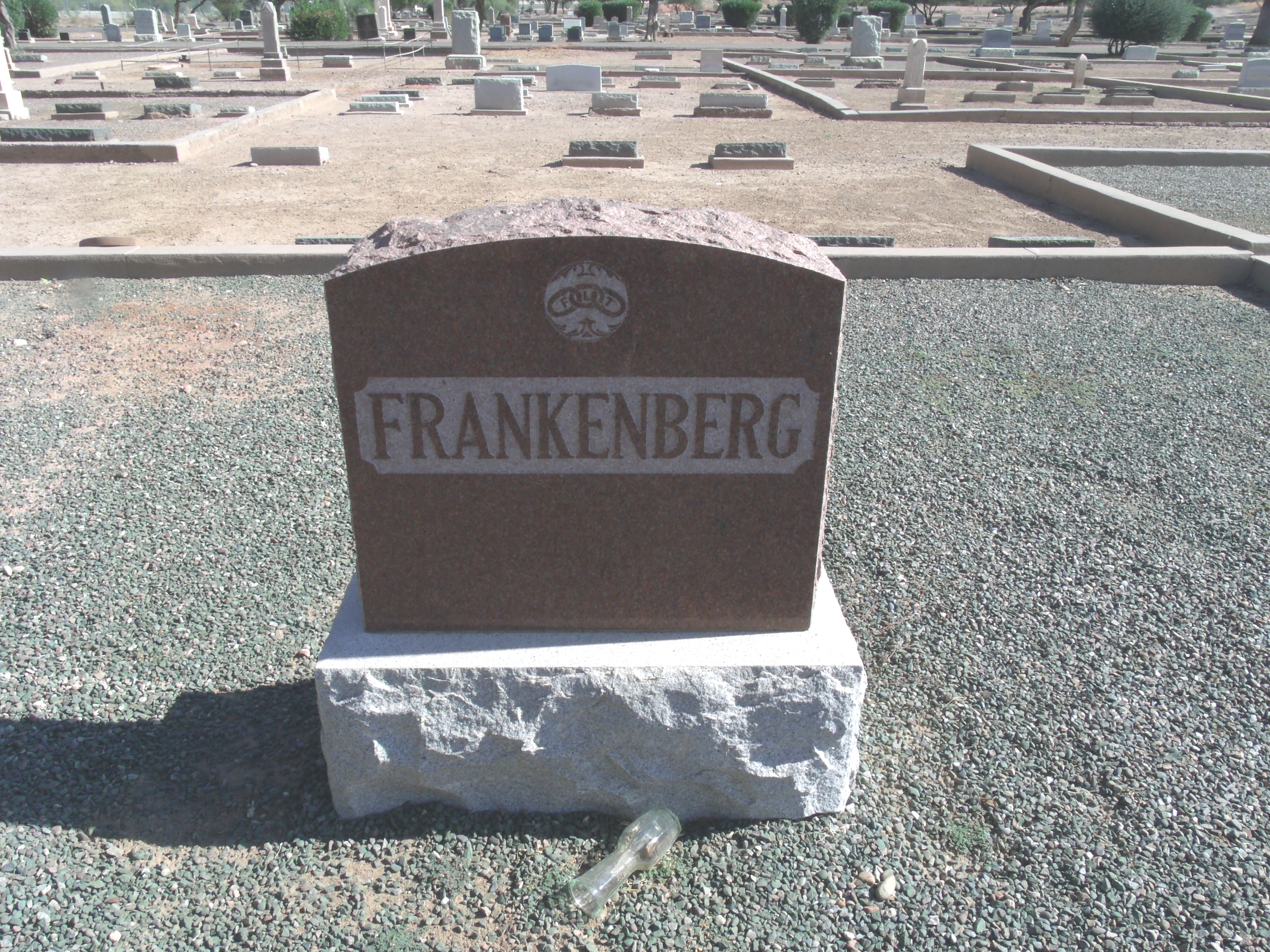
The grave site of Josephine Frankenberg (?–1949).

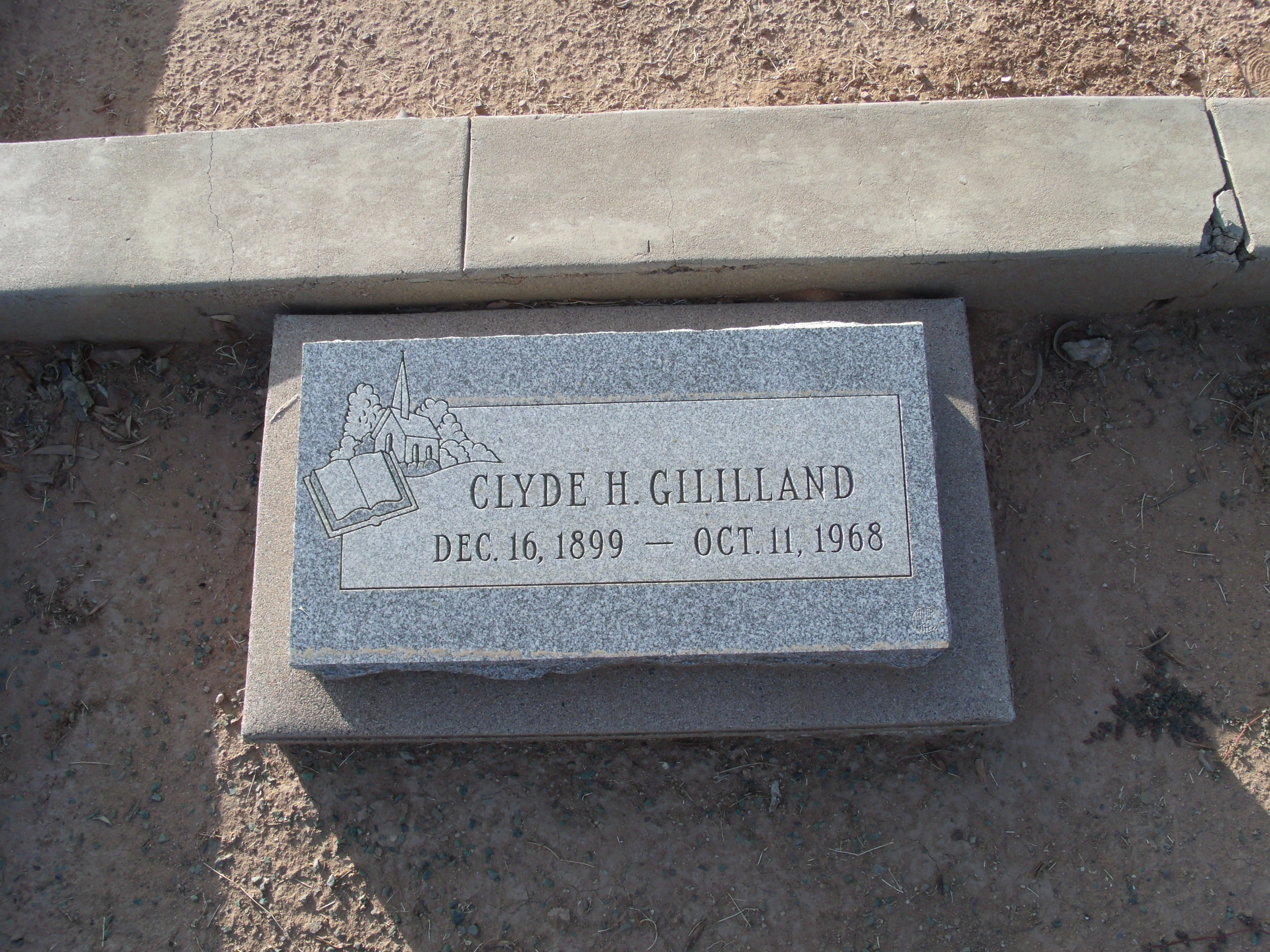
The grave site of Clyde Harlen Gililland (1899–1968).

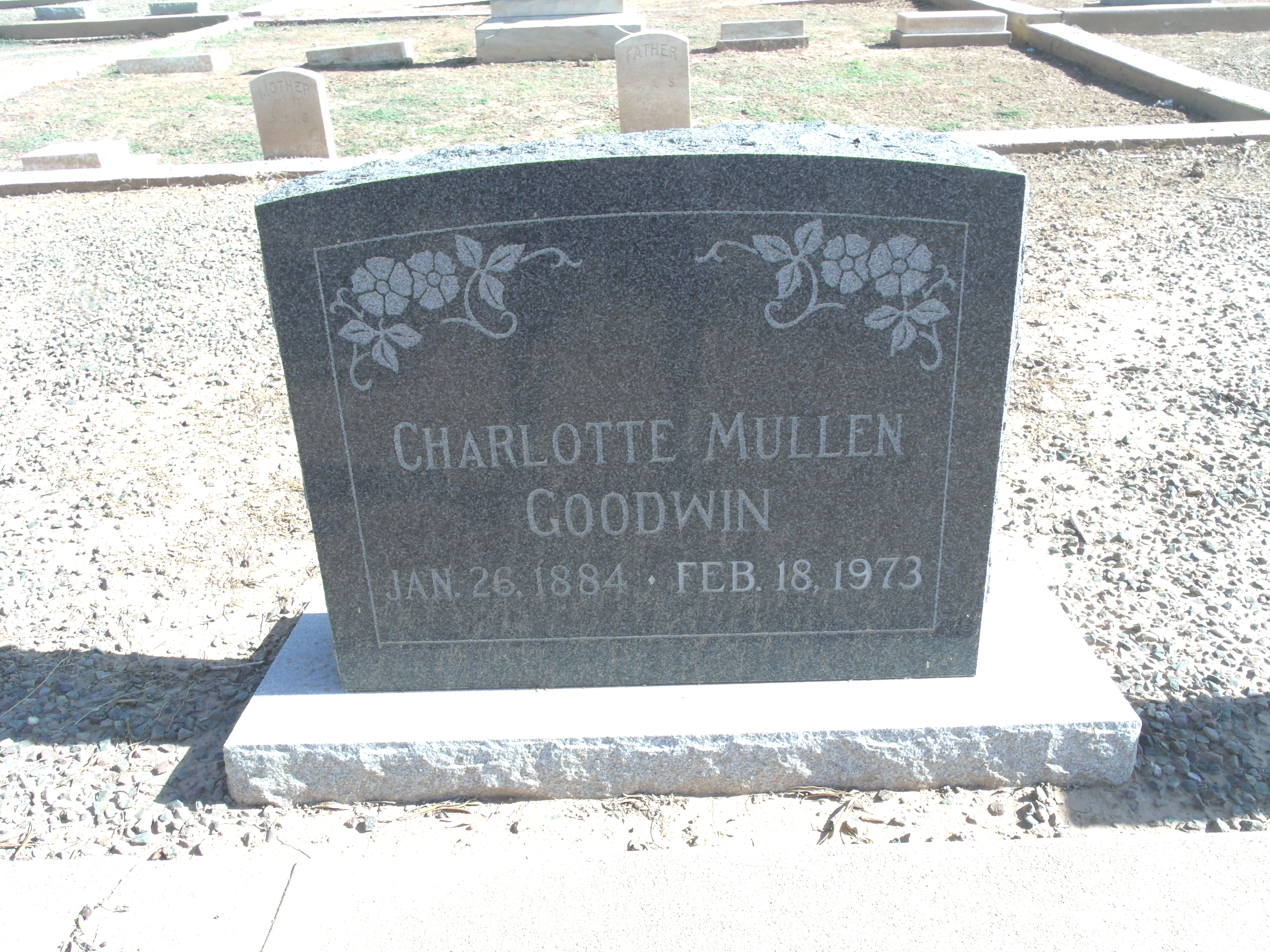
The grave site of Charlotte Josephine Mullen Goodwin (1884–1973).

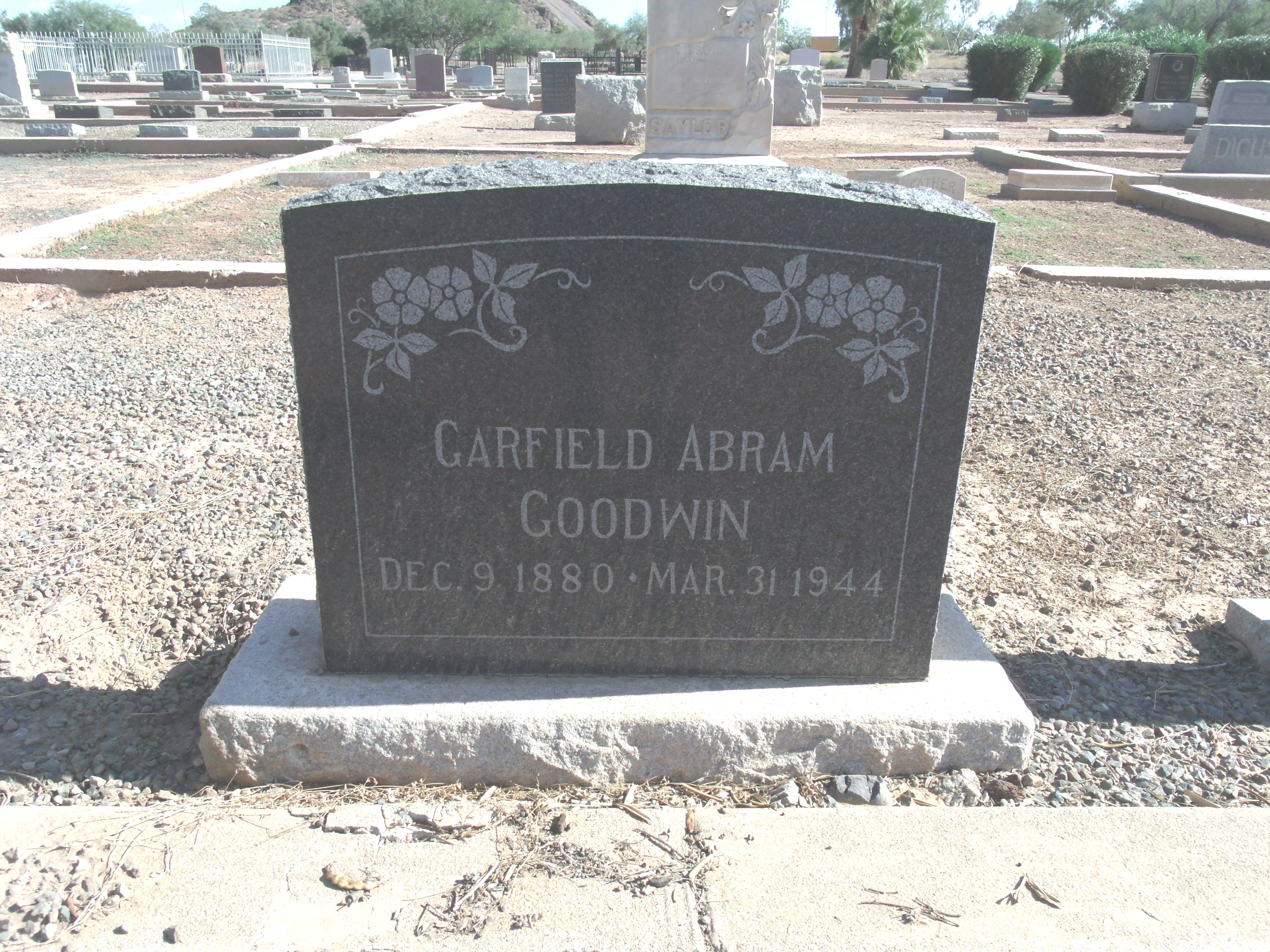
The grave site of Garfield Abram Goodwin (1880–1944).

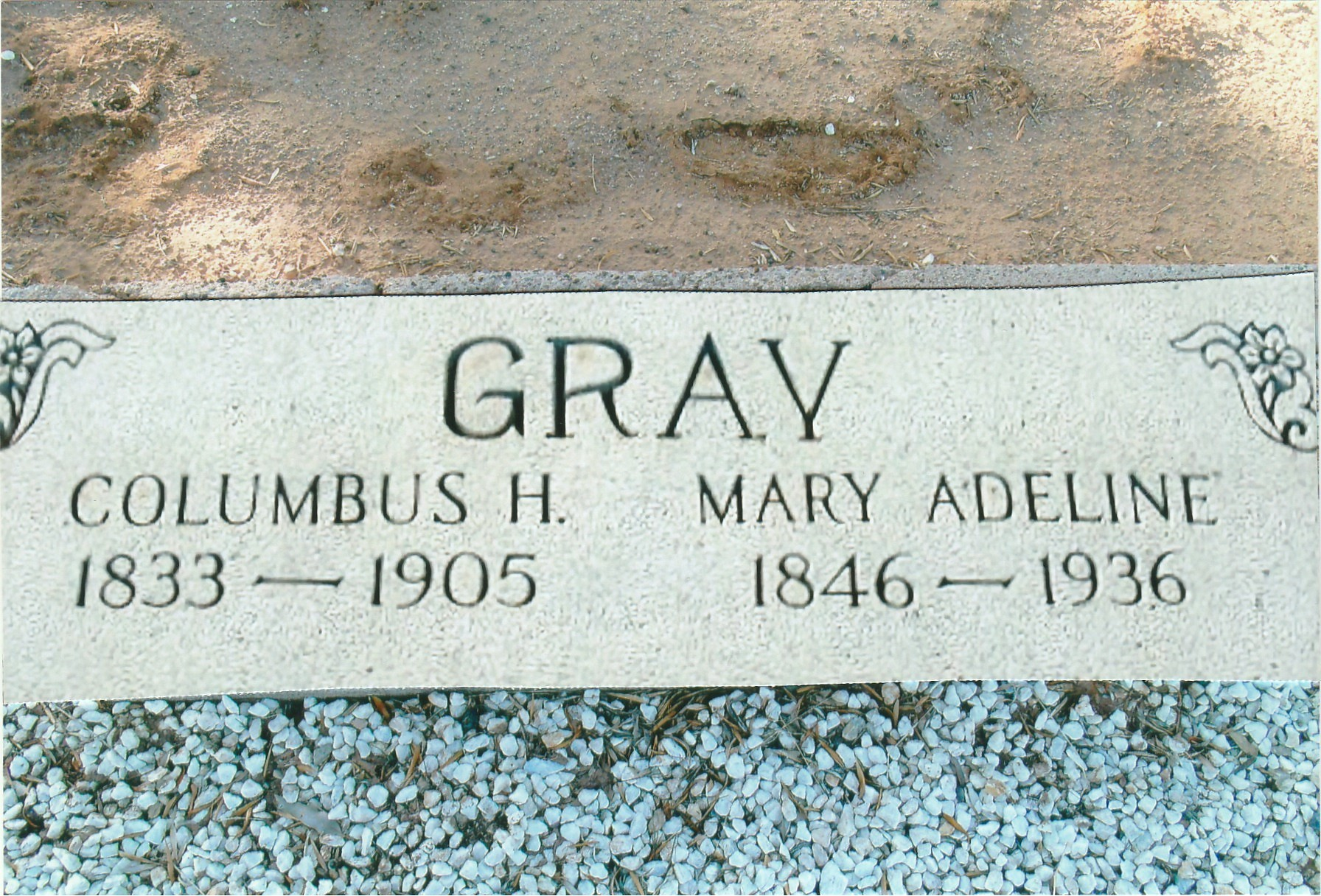
The grave site of Columbus H. Gray (1833–1905) and his wife Mary A. Gray (1846–1936).

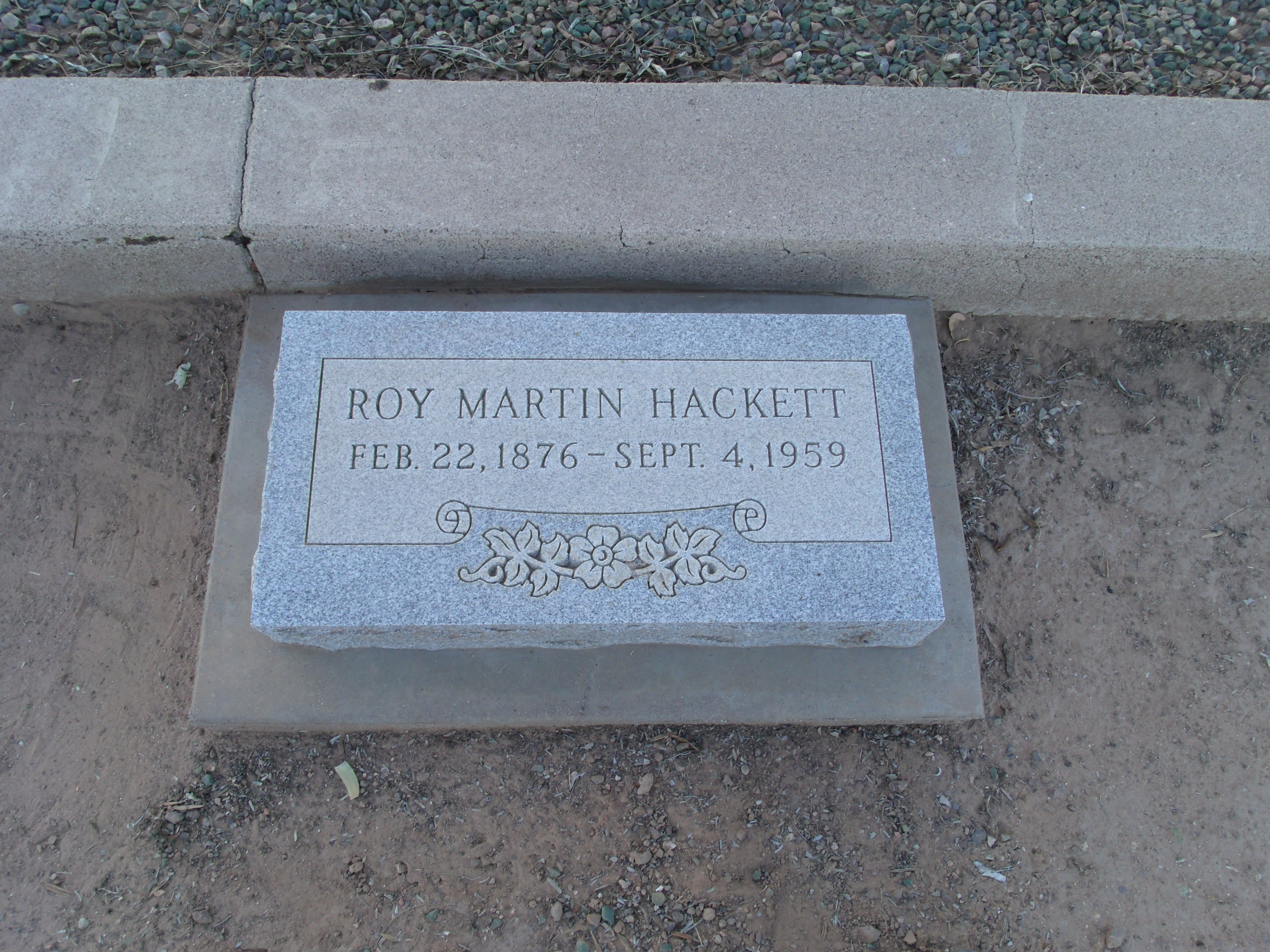
The grave site of Roy Martin Hackett (1877–1945).

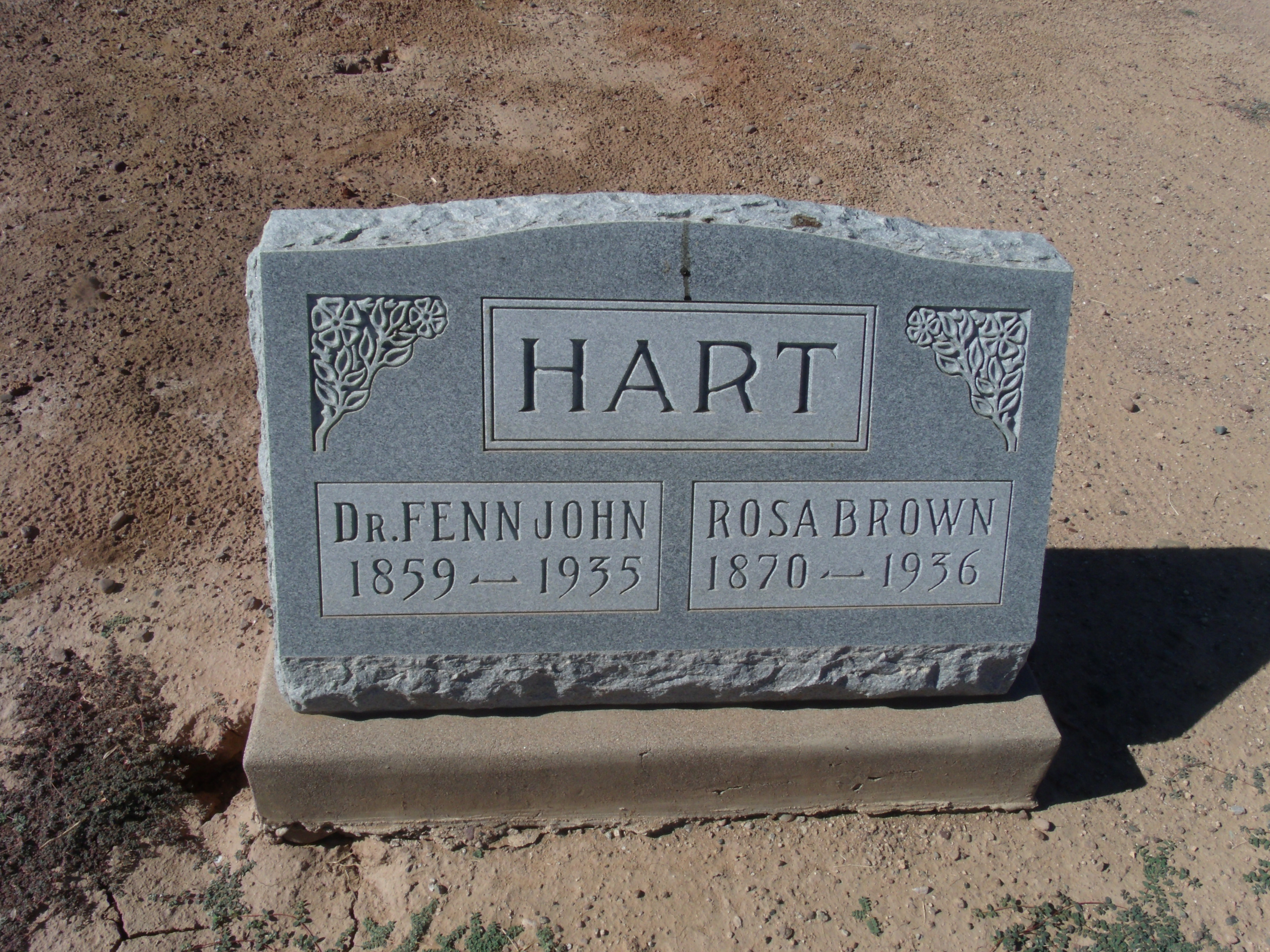
The grave site of Dr. Fenn John Hart (1859–1935) and his wife Rosa Brown Hart (1870–1936).

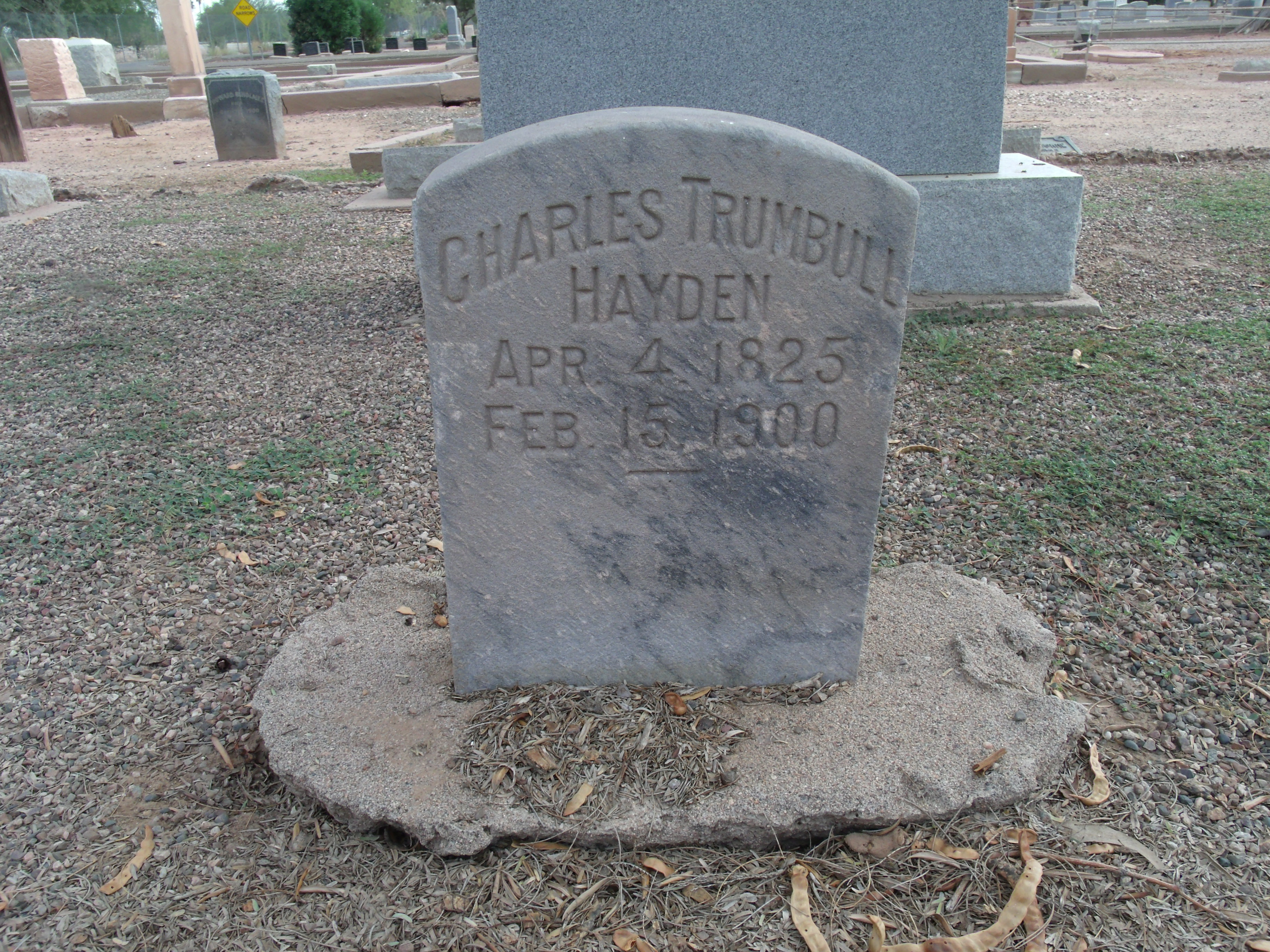
The grave site of Charles Trumbull Hayden (1825–1900).

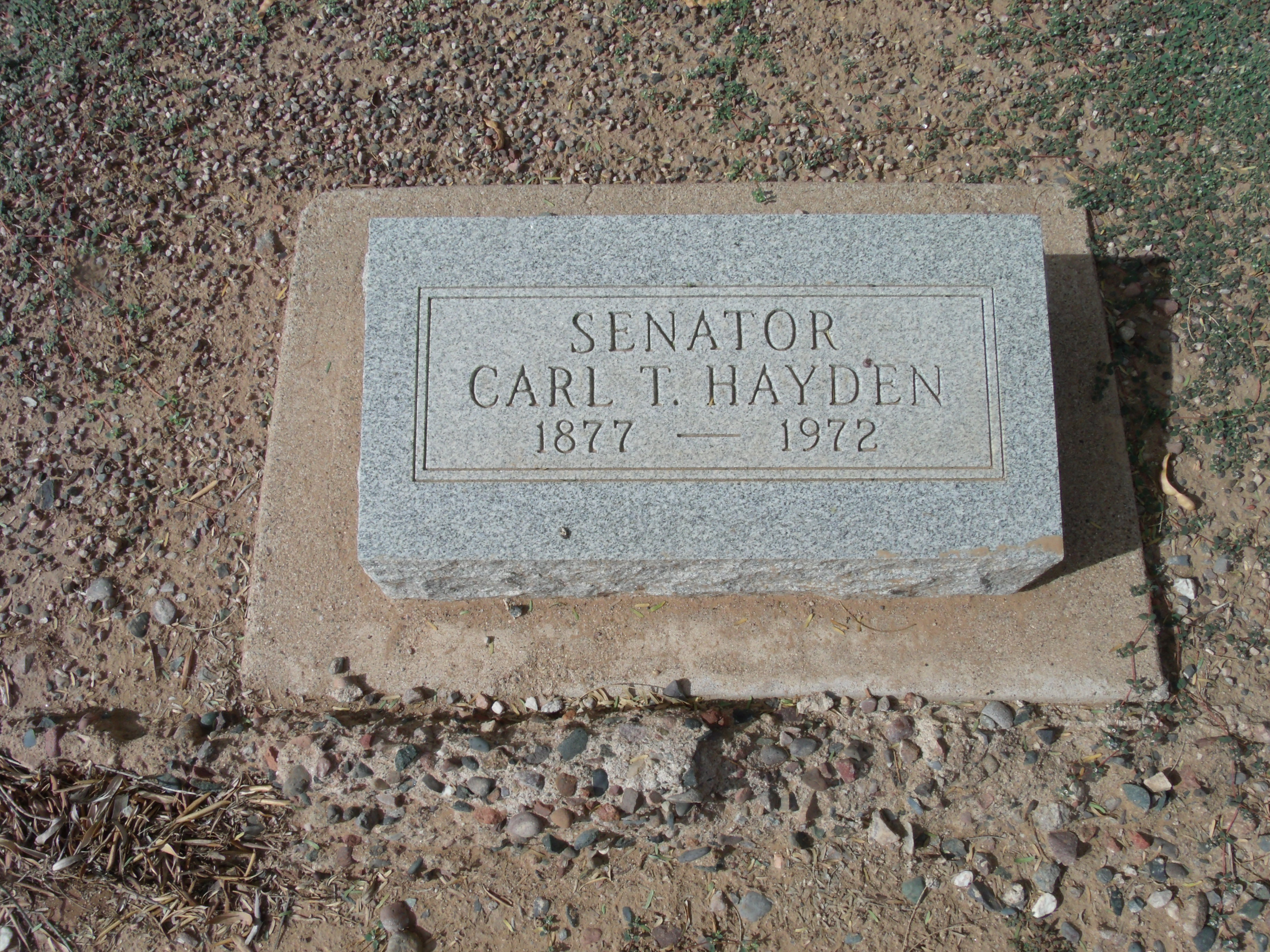
The grave site of Carl T. Hayden (1877–1972).

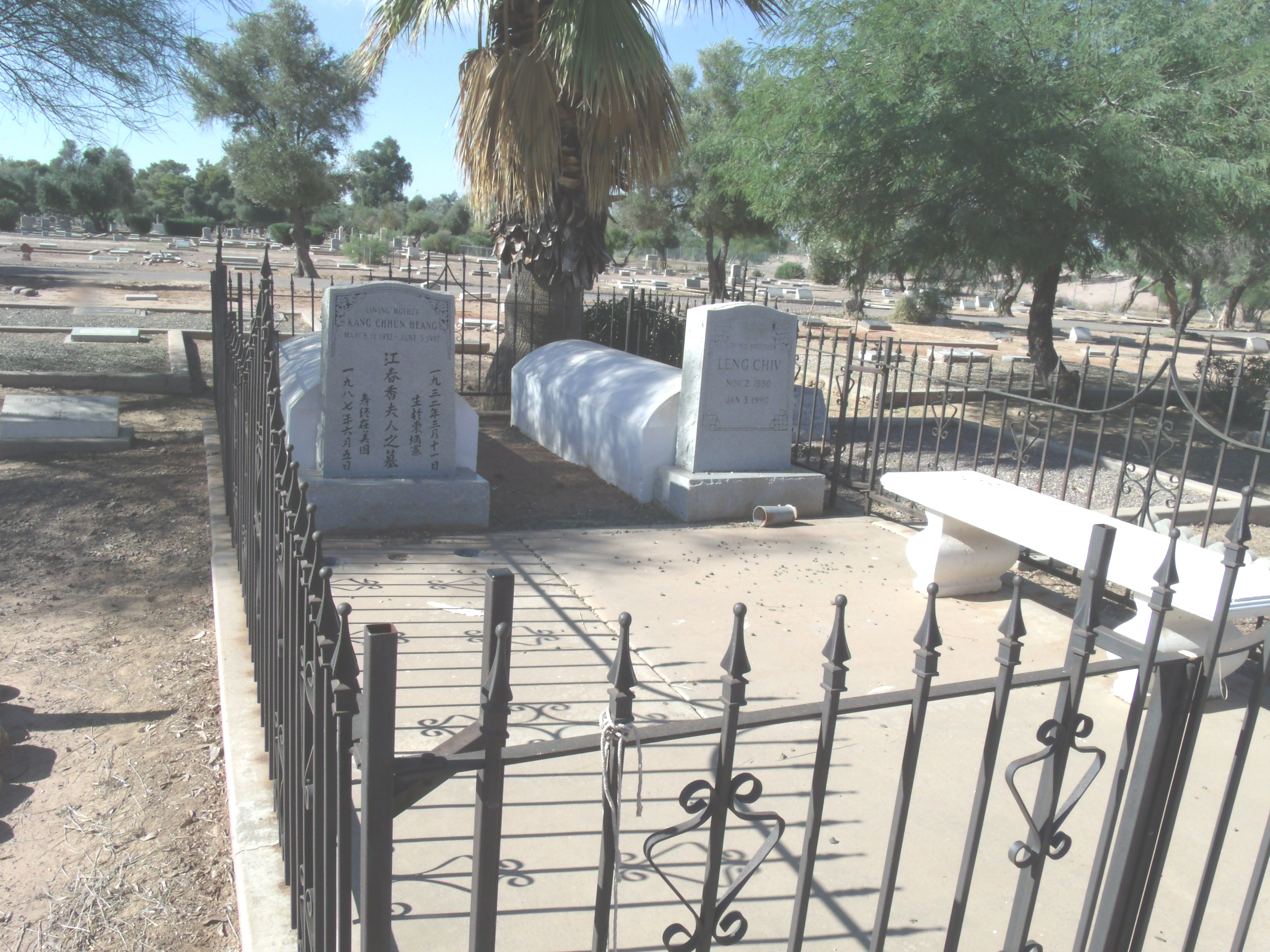
The grave site of Kang Chhun Heang (1932–1987) and her son Leng Chiv (1950–1990). The Chinese pioneers are buried in sec. G.

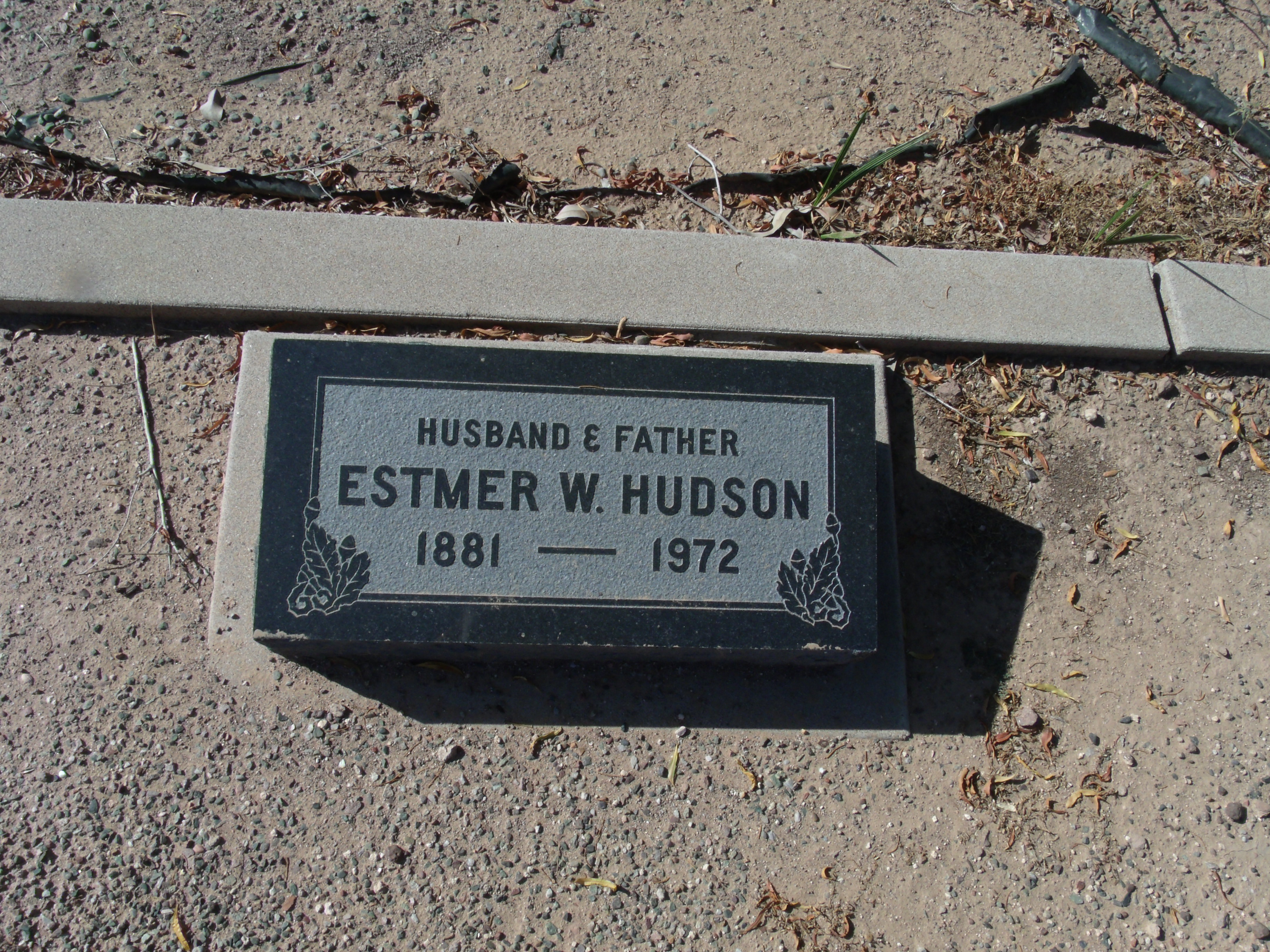
The grave site of Estmer W. Hudson (1881–1972).

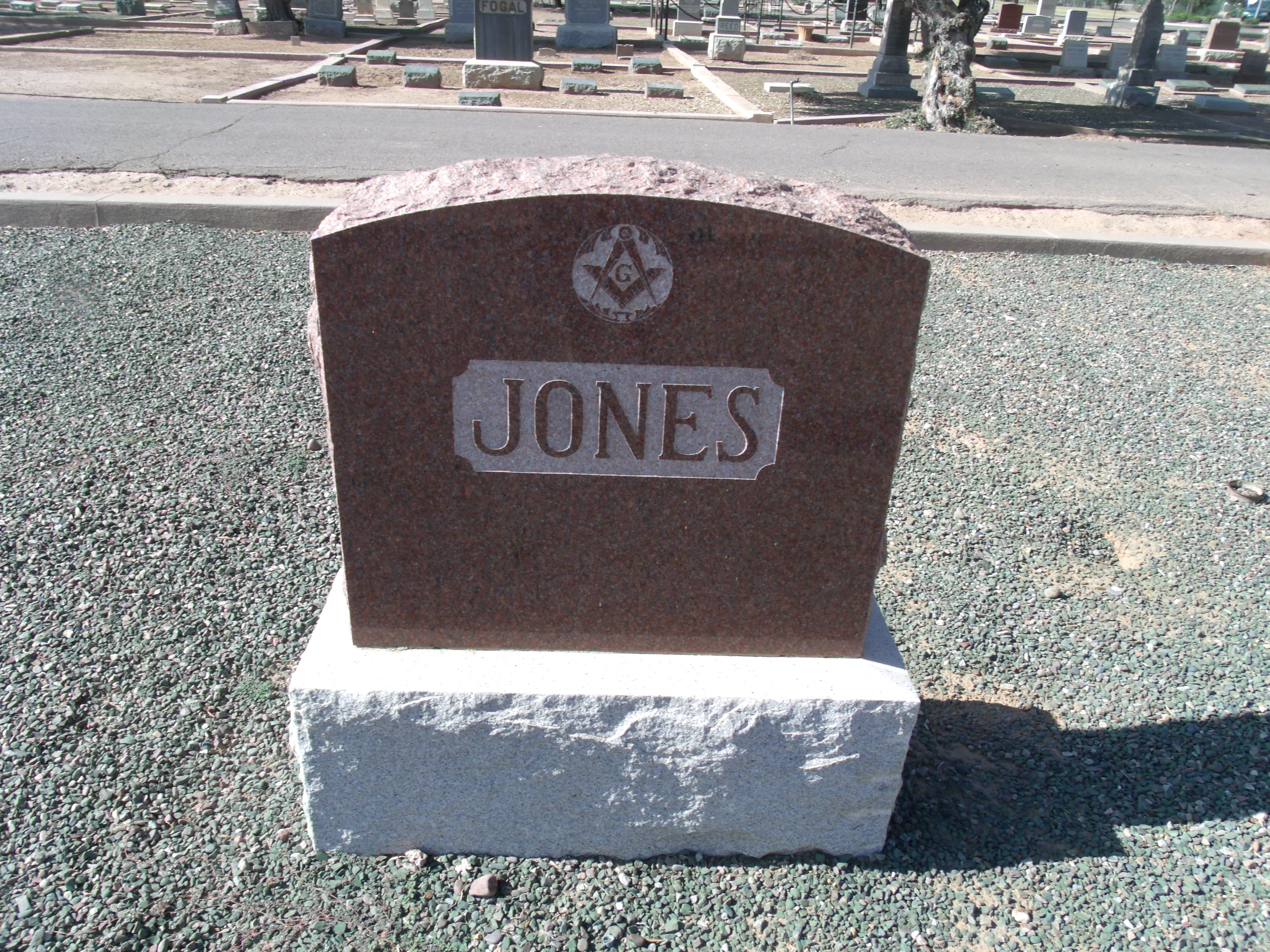
The grave site of Cyrus Grant Jones (?–1926).

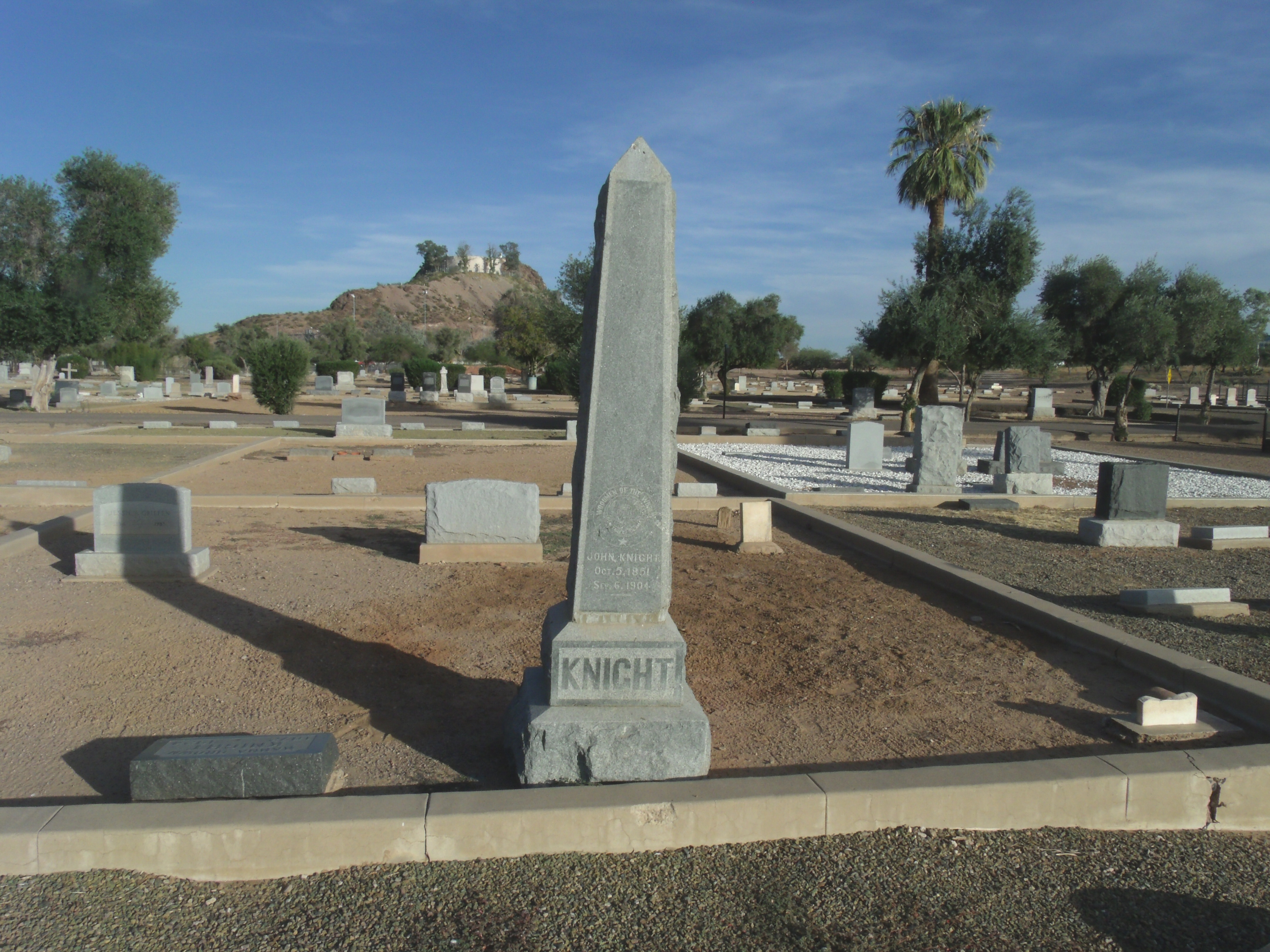
The grave site of John Knight (1854–1904).

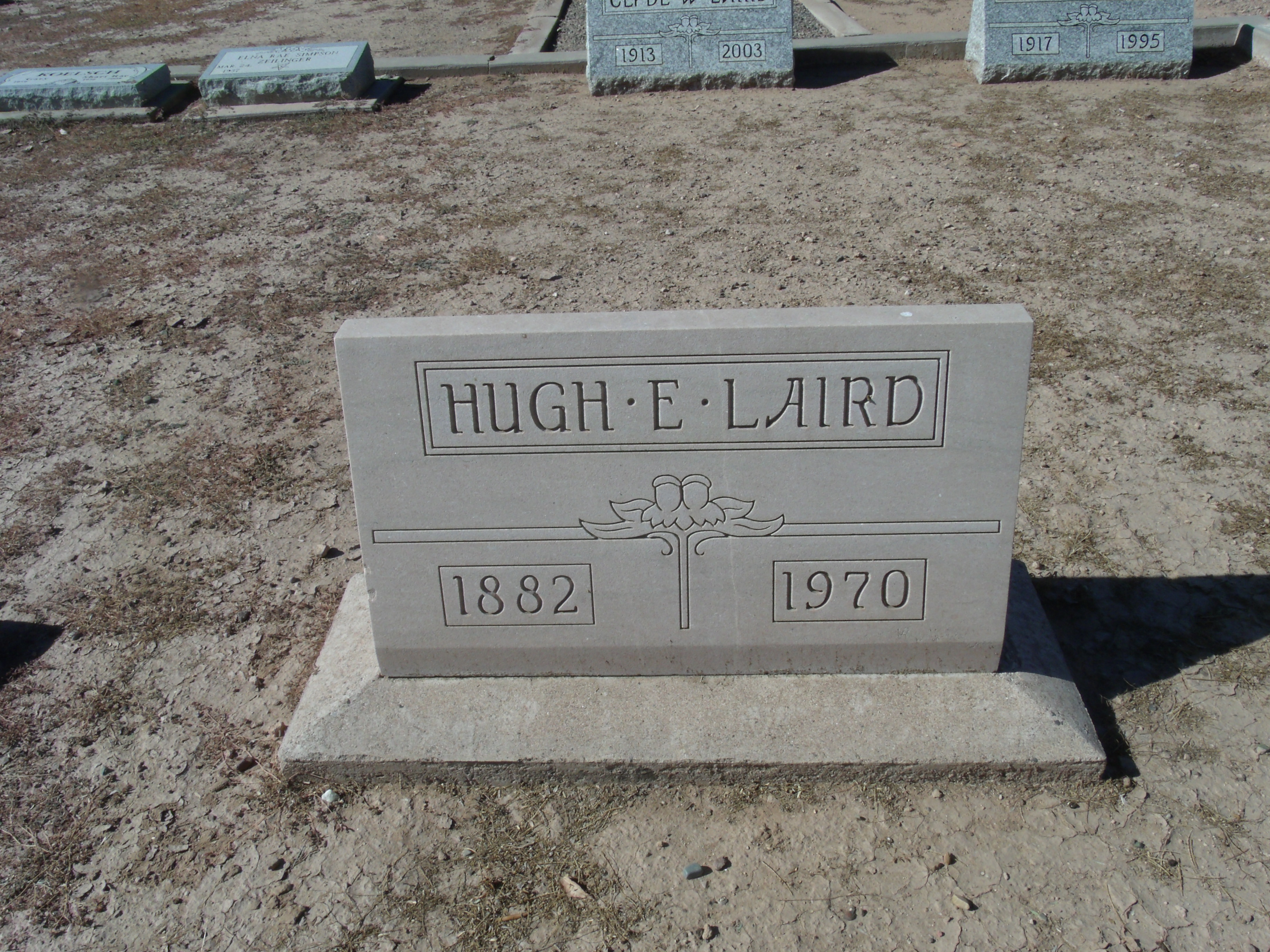
The grave site of Hugh E. Laird (1882–1970).

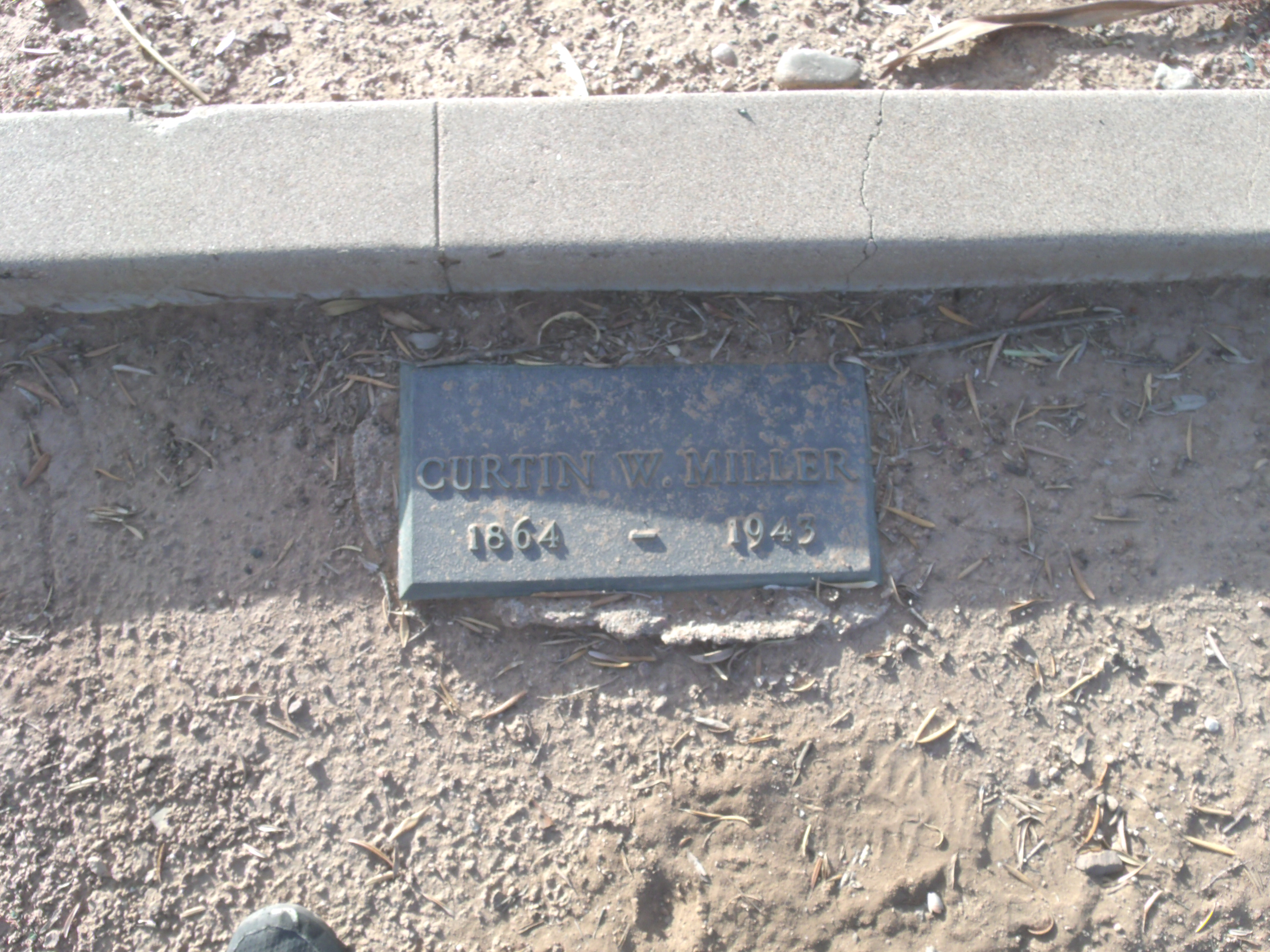
The grave site of Curtin “Curt” W. Miller (1864–1943).

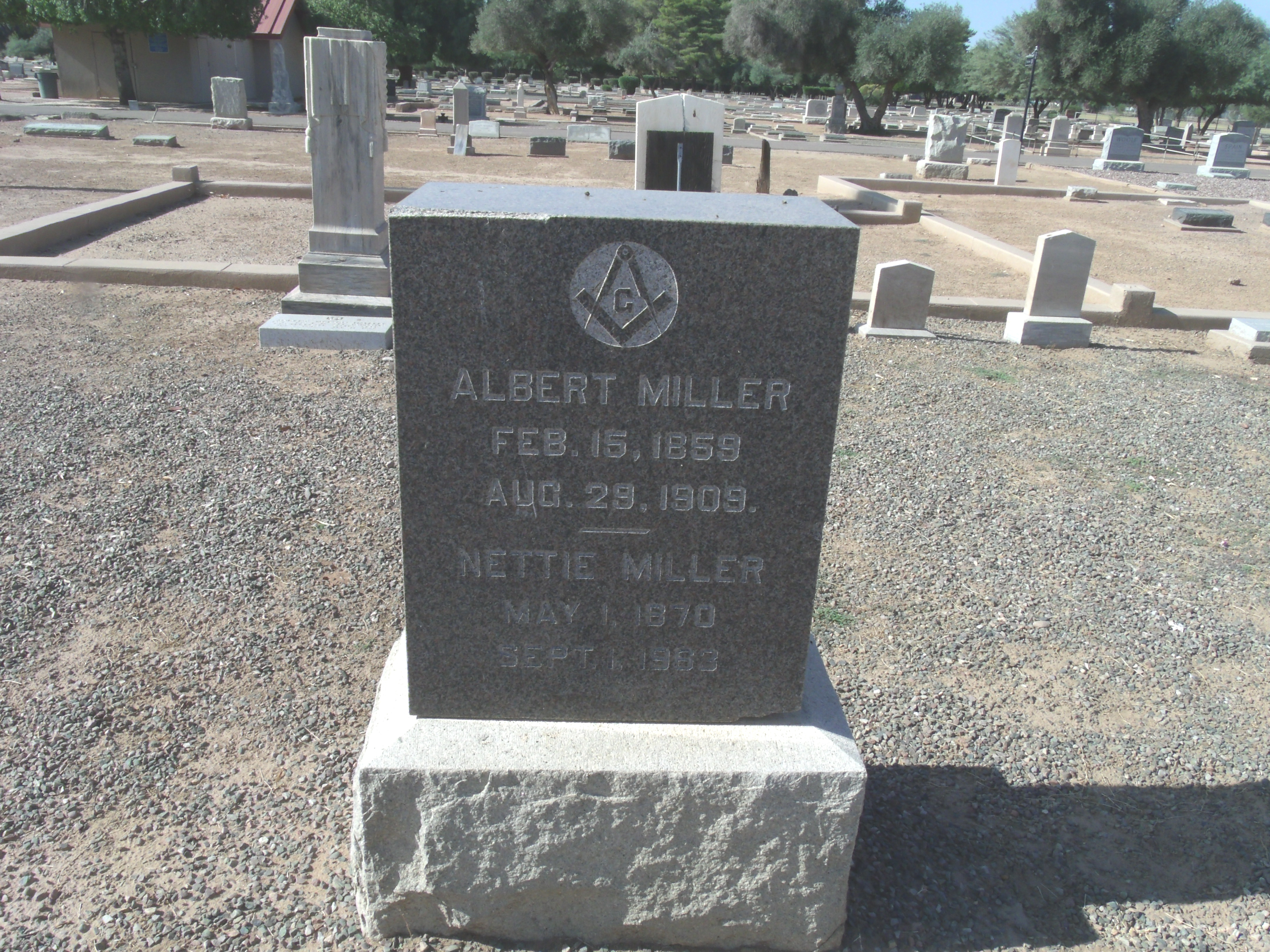
The grave site of Albert E. Miller (1859–1909) and Nettie Miller (1870–1983).

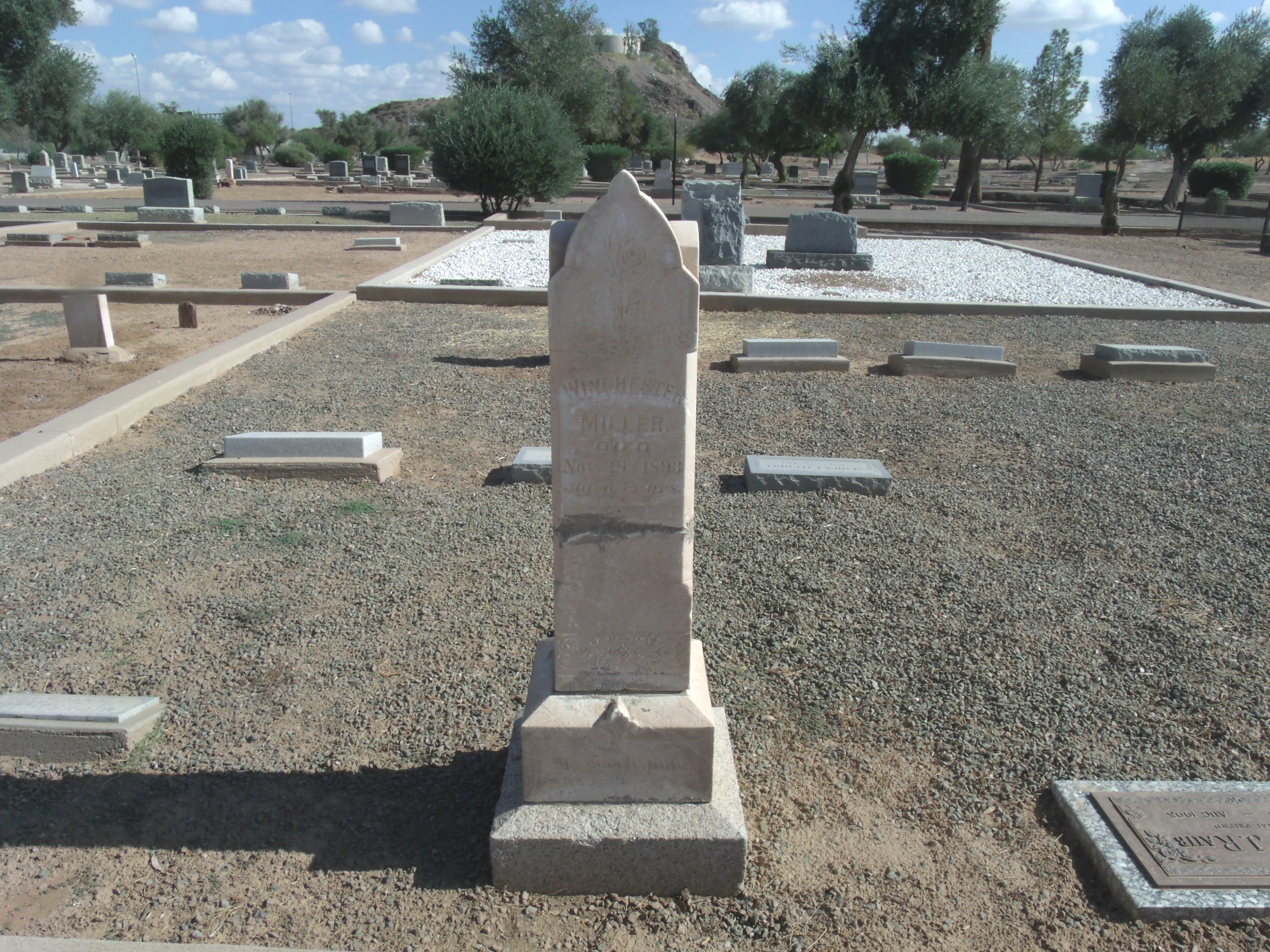
The grave site of Winchester Miller (?–1893).

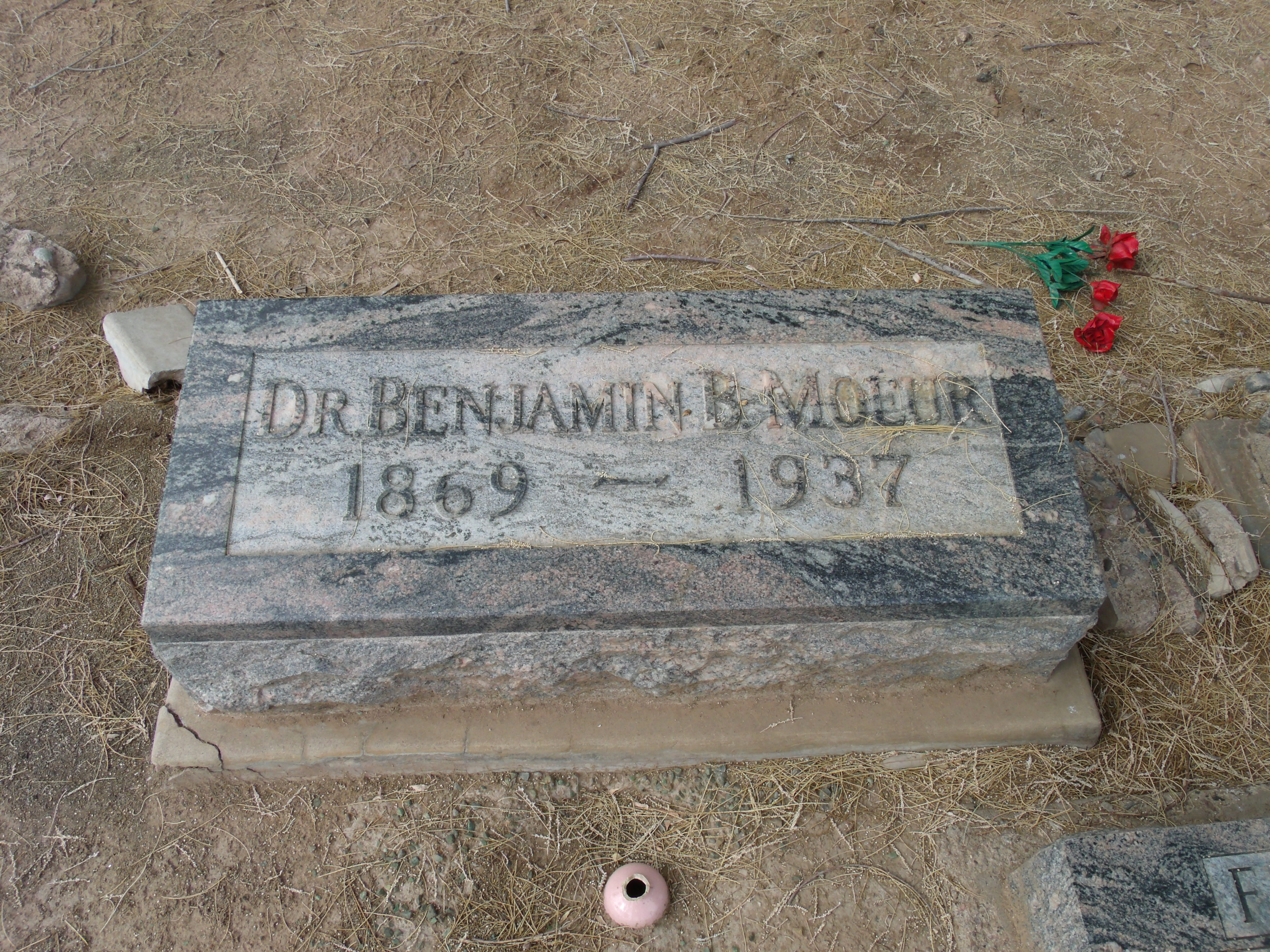
The grave site of Benjamin Baker Moeur (1869–1937).

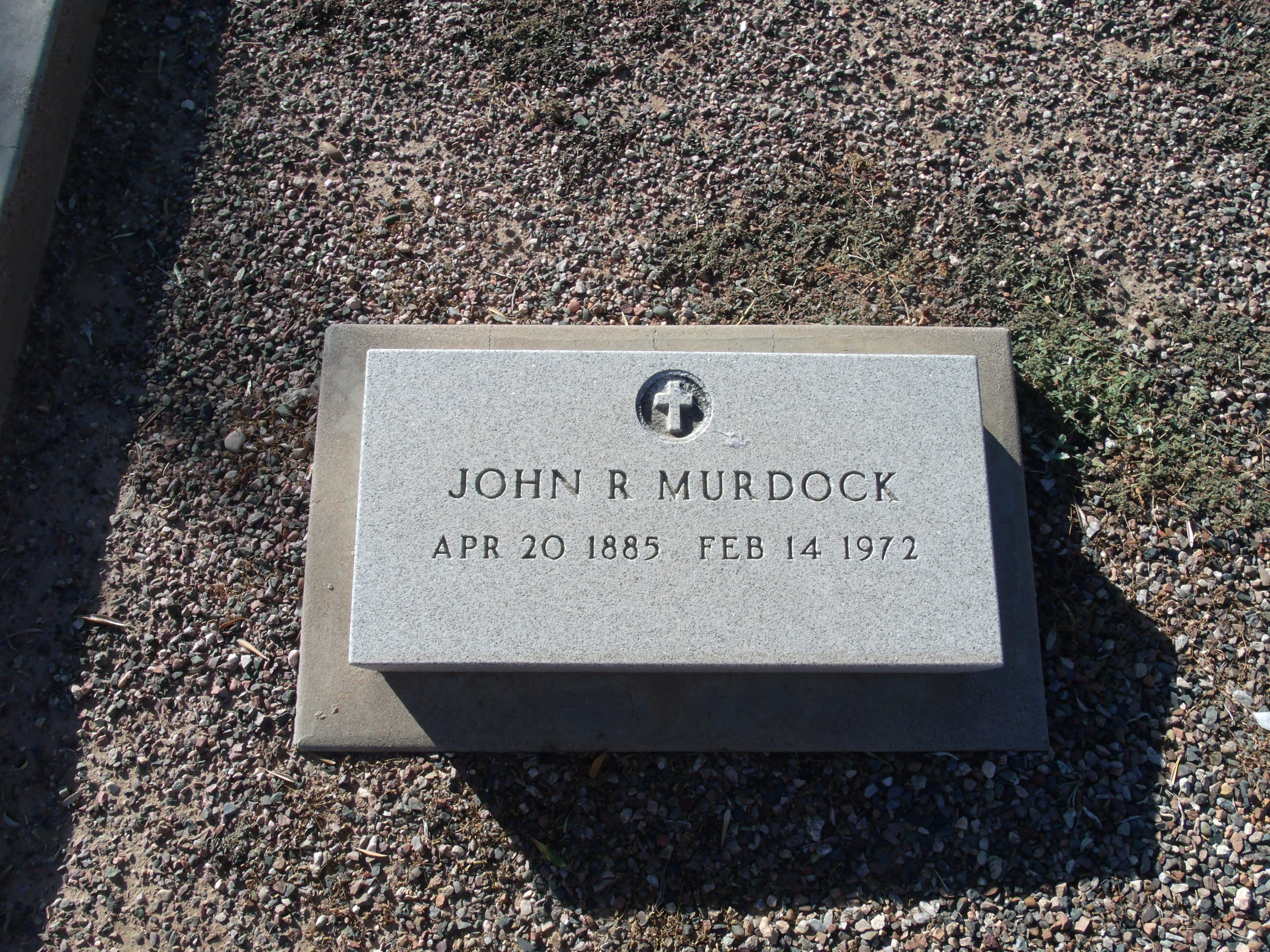
The grave site of John Robert Murdock (1885–1972).

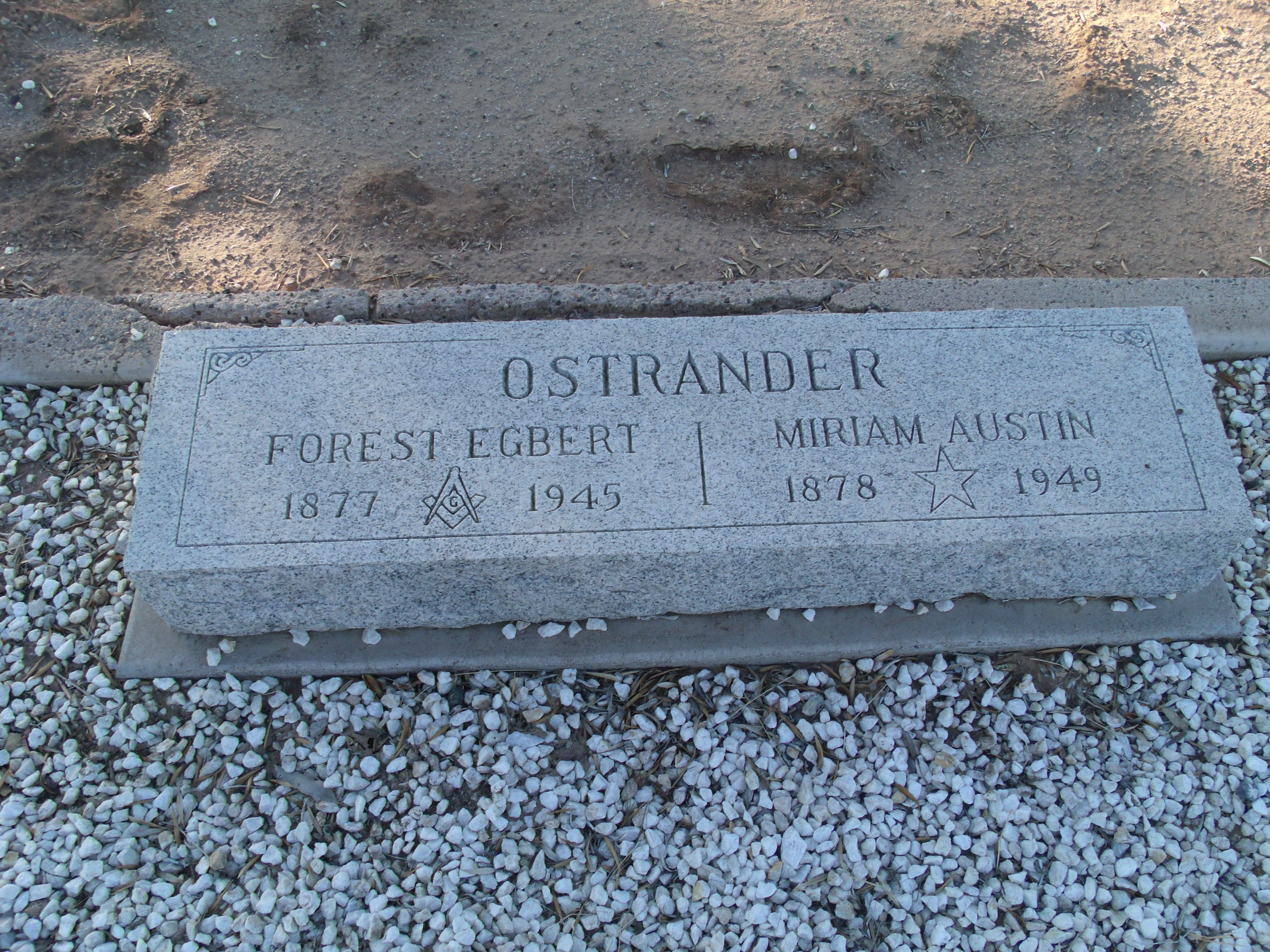
The grave site of Forest Egbert Ostrander (1877–1945) and his wife Miriam Austin Ostrander (1878–1949).

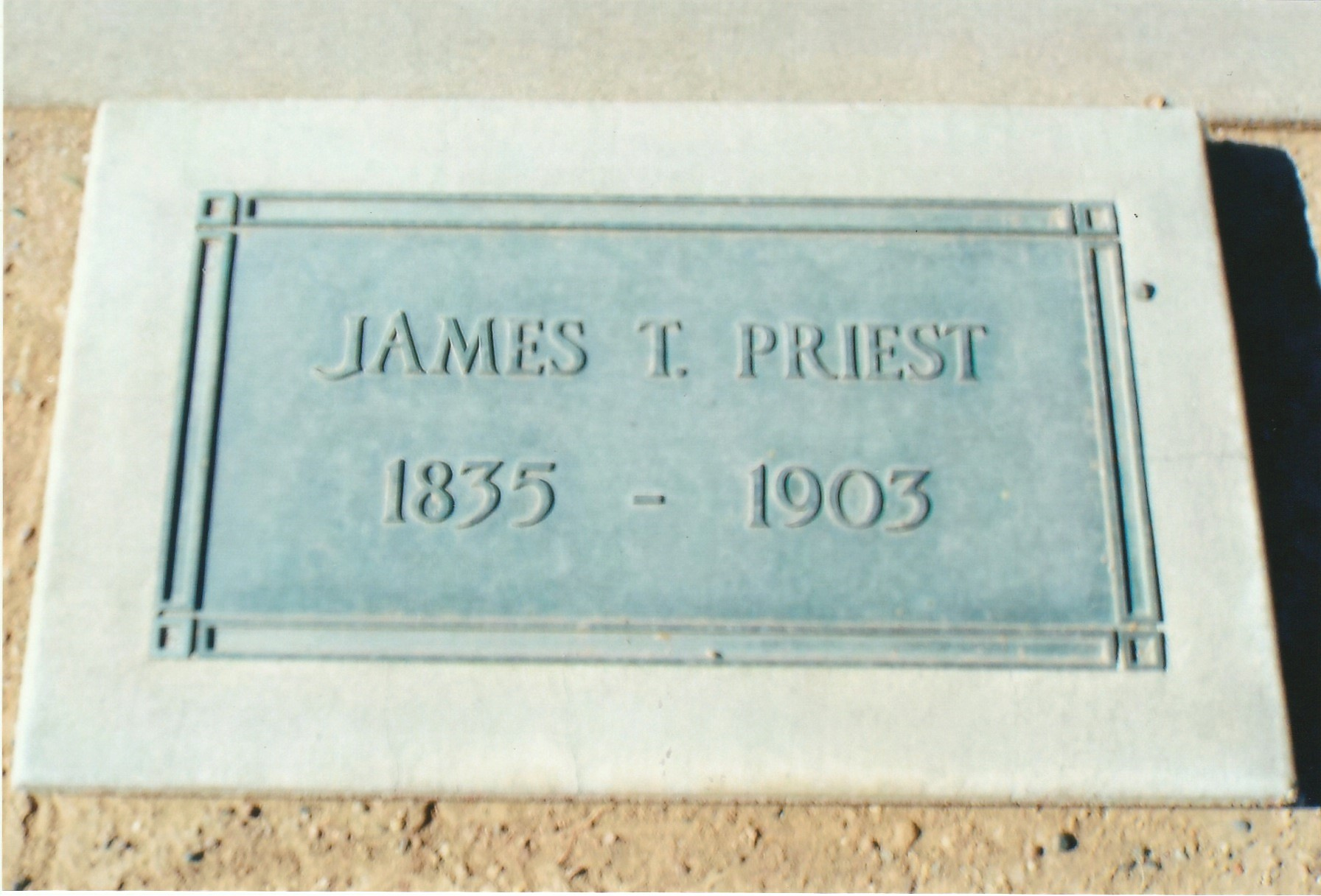
The grave site of James T. Priest (1835–1903).

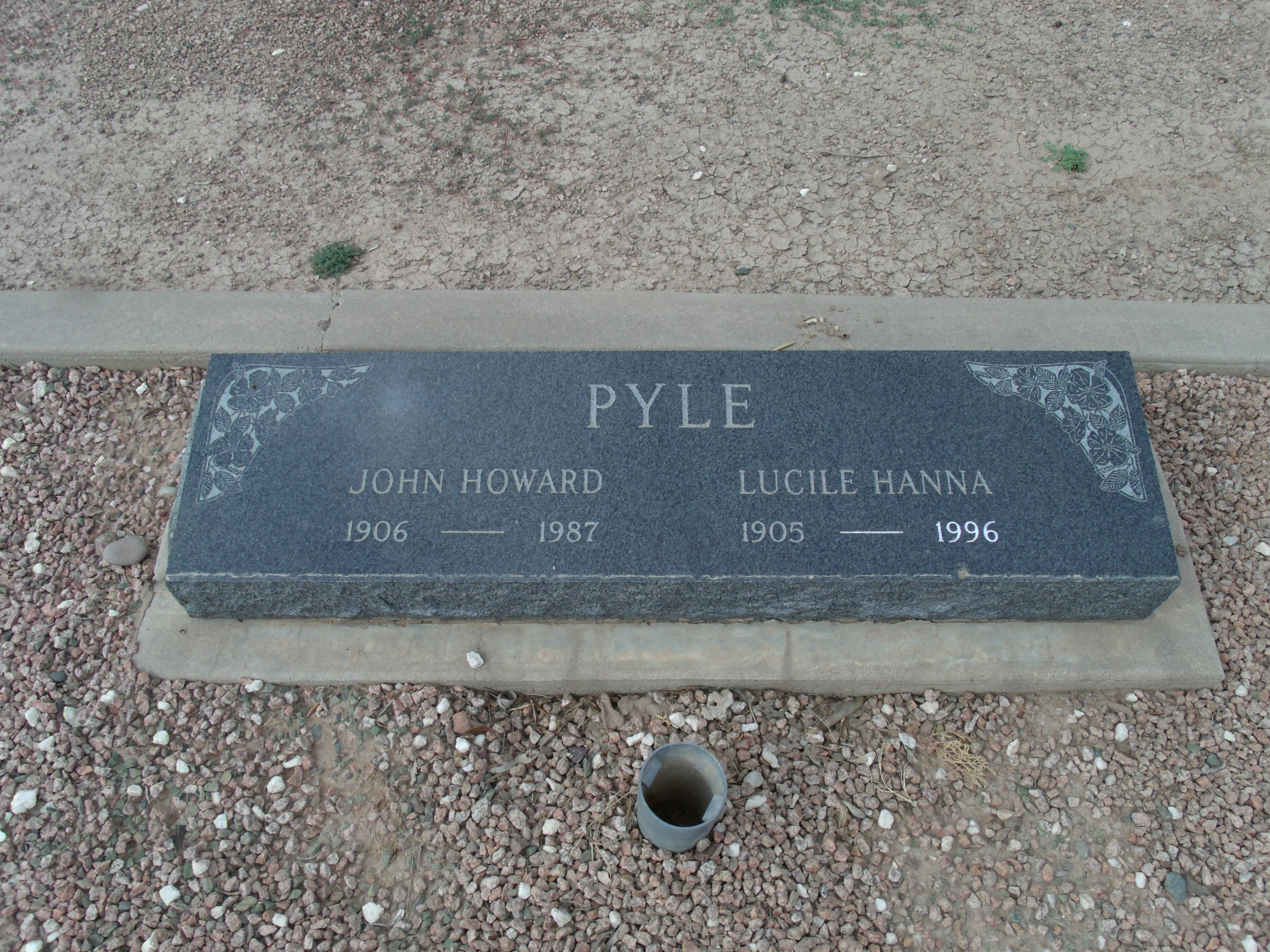
The grave site of John Howard Pyle (1906–1987).

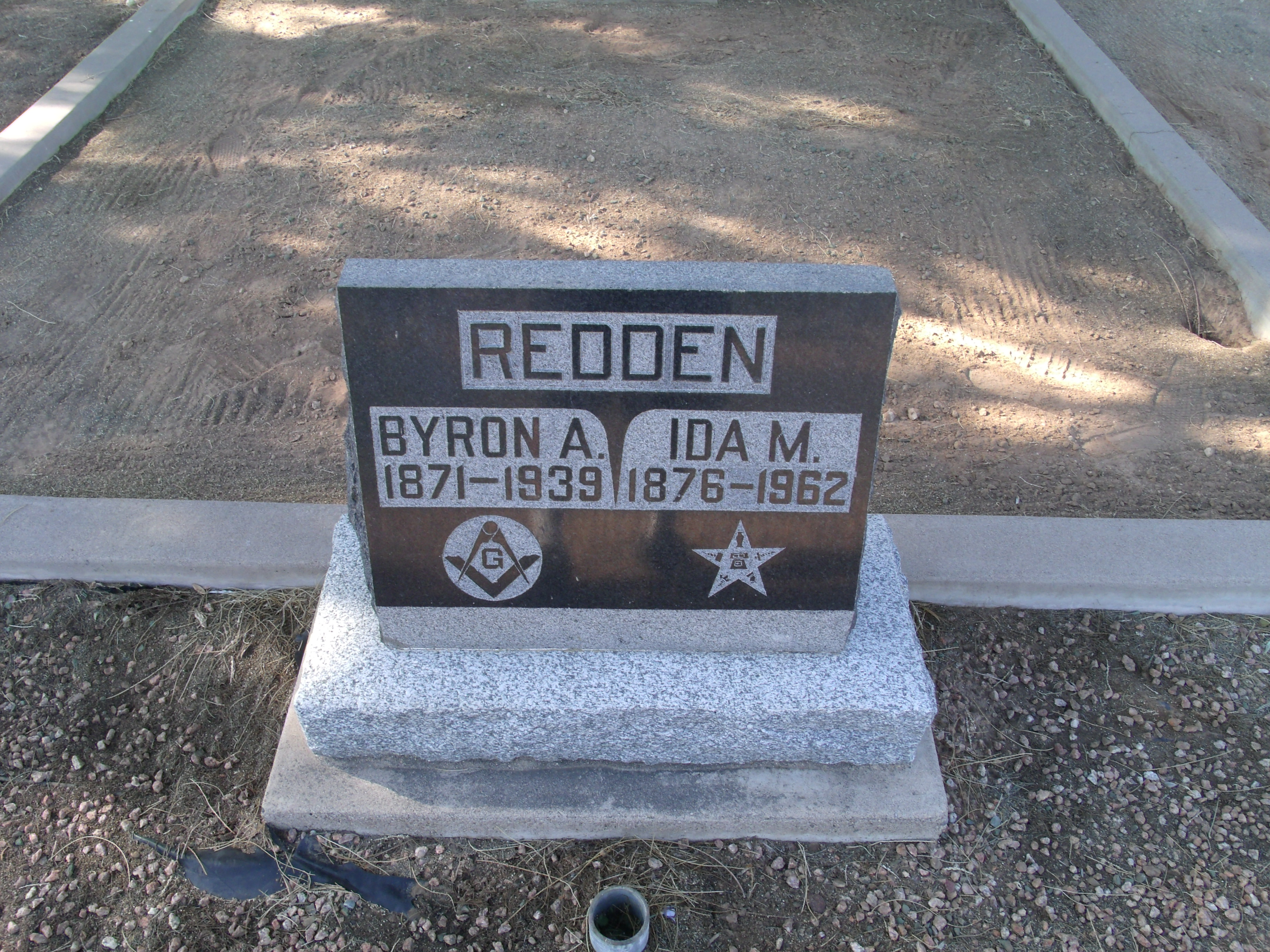
The grave site of Byron Alton Redden (1871–1939) and his wife Ida M. Redden (1878–1962).

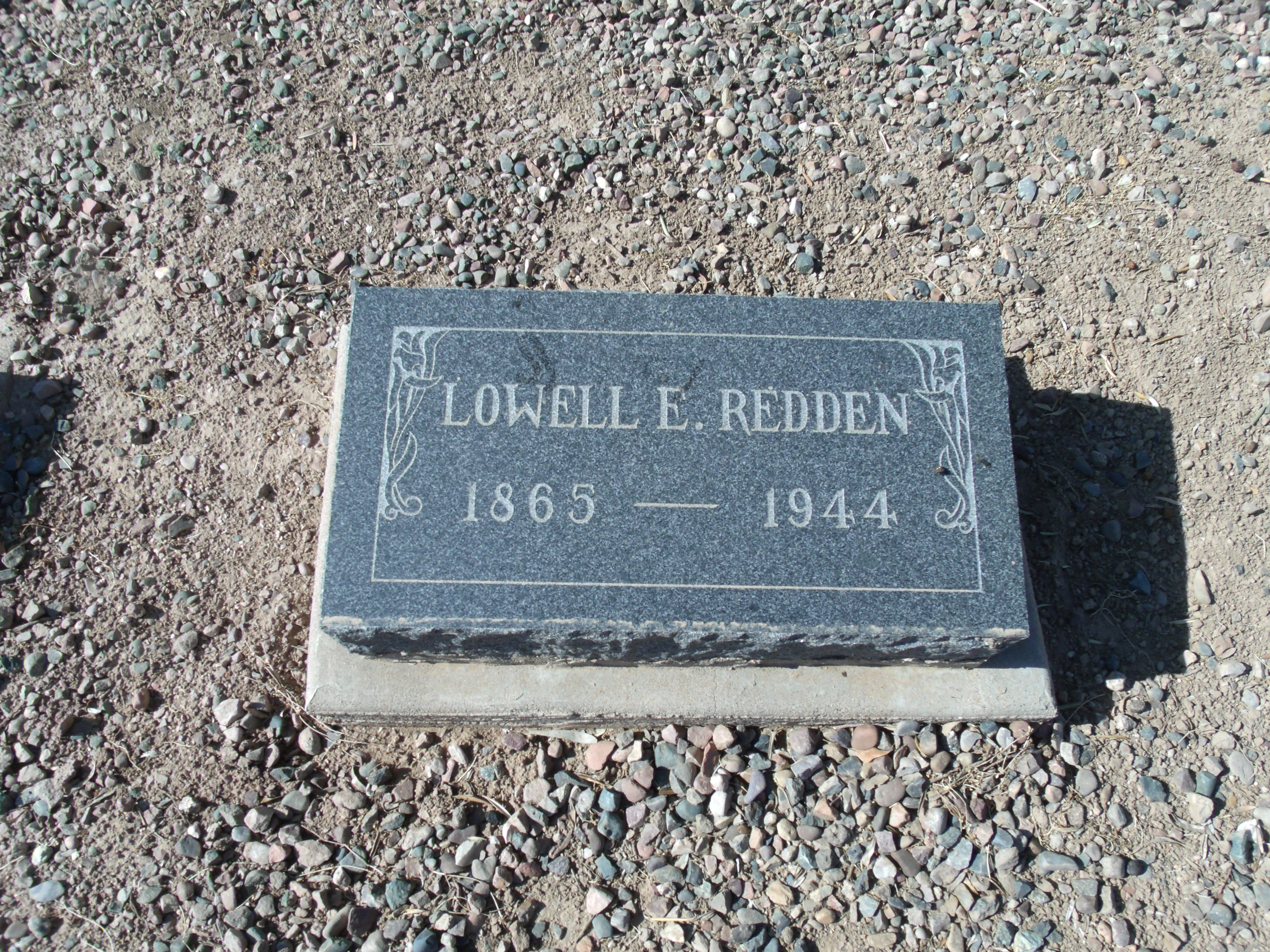
The grave site of Lowell Edward Redden (1865–1944).

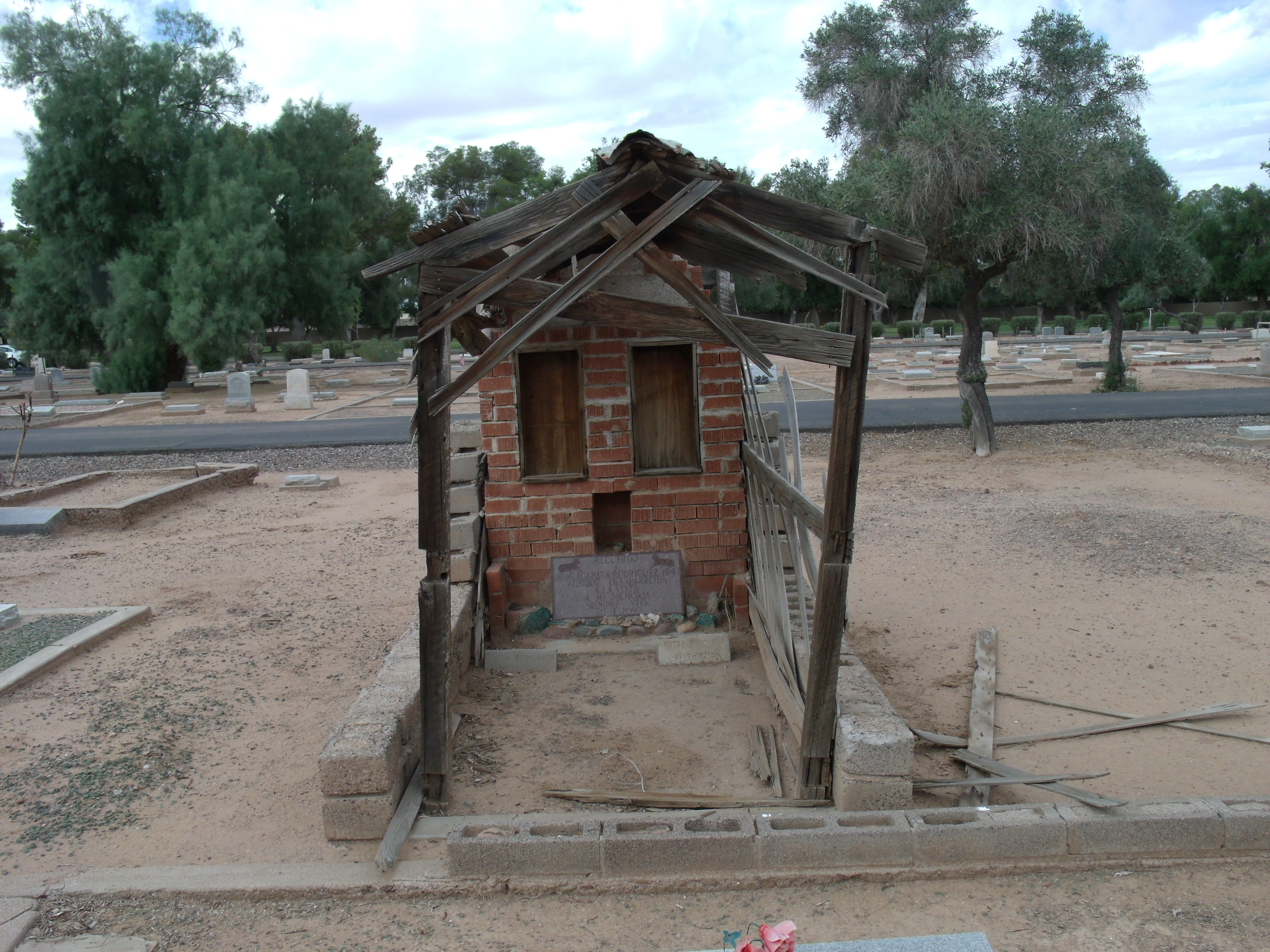
The grave site of Juanita Rodriguez (1886–1941).

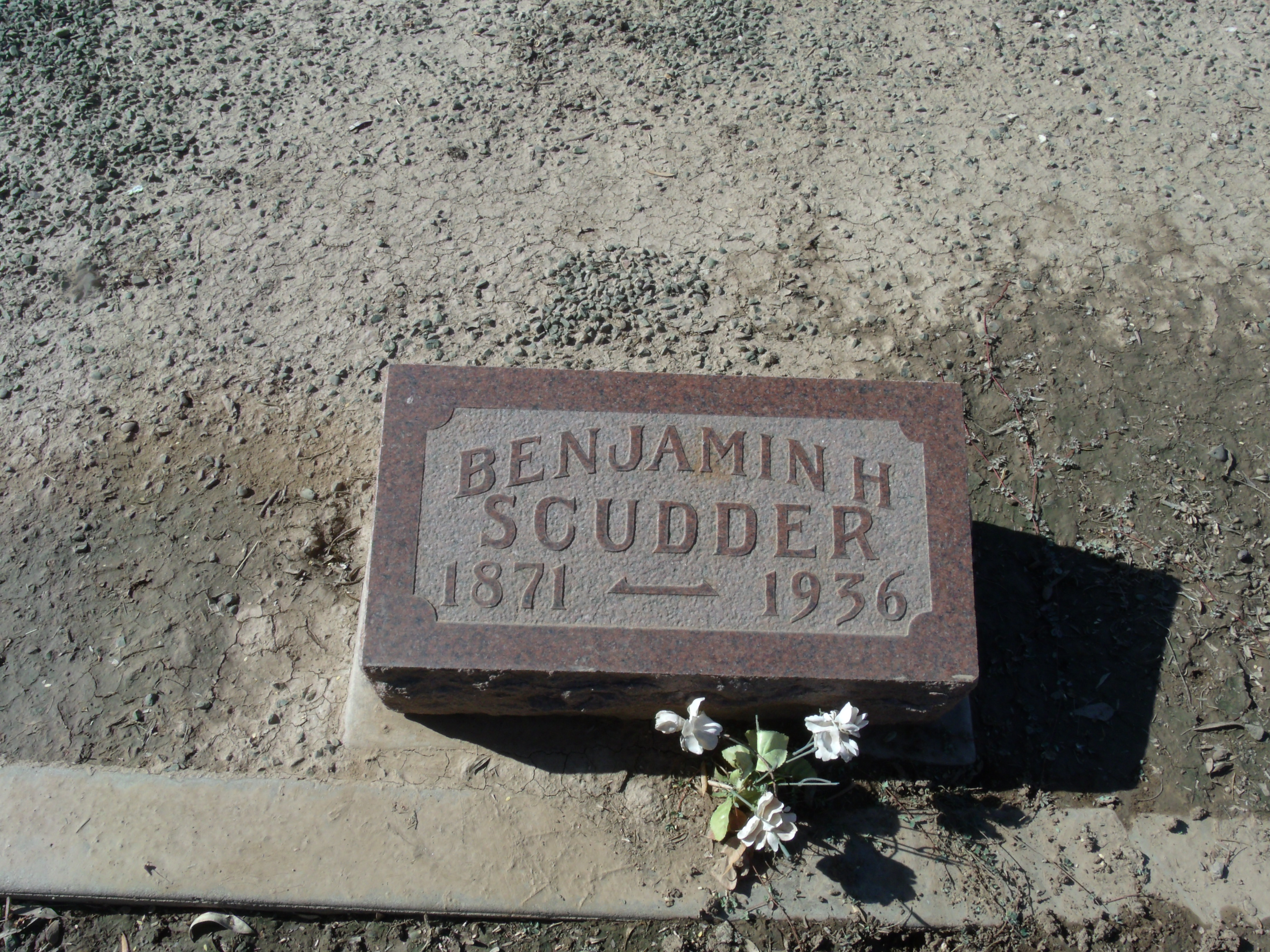
The grave site of Benjamin Harrison Scudder (1871–1936) and Rebecca Scudder (1870–1946).

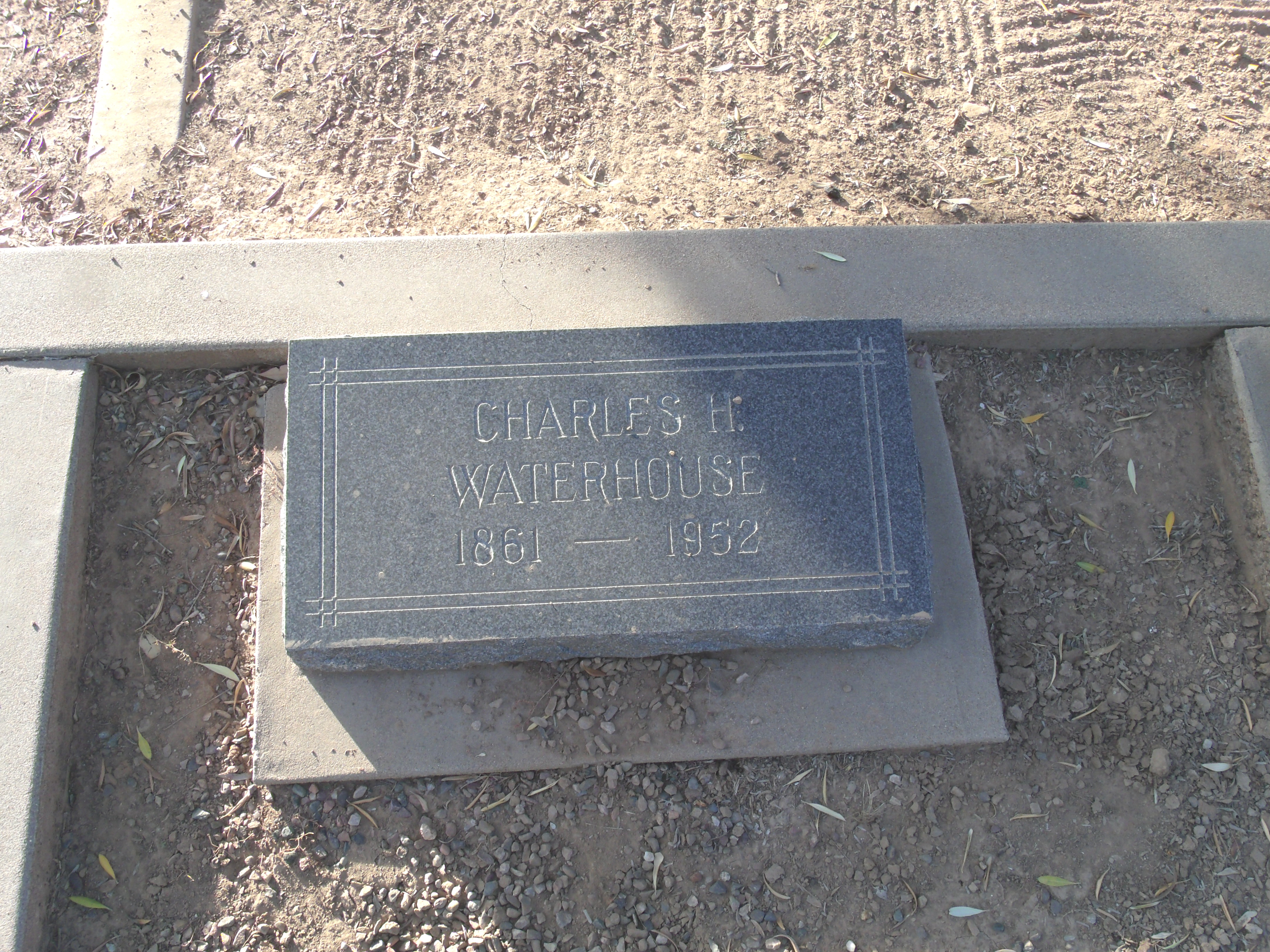
The grave site of Charles Henry Waterhouse (1861–1952).

== See also ==
- National Register of Historic Places listings in Arizona
- Adamsville A.O.U.W. Cemetery
- City of Mesa Cemetery
- Home Mission Cemetery
- Goodyear Farms Historic Cemetery
- Glendale Memorial Park Cemetery
- Greenwood/Memory Lawn Mortuary & Cemetery
- Pioneer and Military Memorial Park
- St. Francis Catholic Cemetery
- Historic Pinal Cemetery
- National Register of Historic Places listings in Maricopa County, Arizona
