= Pinkston =

Pinkston may refer to:

== Places ==
- Pinkston, a sub-area of Sighthill, Glasgow, Scotland

== People ==
- Clarence Pinkston (1900–1961), American diver
- Rob Pinkston (born 1988), American actor
- Russell Pinkston (born 1949), American Professor of Composition
- Ryan Pinkston (born 1988), American actor
- Todd Pinkston (born 1977), American football player

== Organisations ==
- L. G. Pinkston High School, a high school in the Dallas Independent School District
- Pinkston Watersports, an artificial whitewater course in Glasgow, Scotland

== See also ==
- Pinxton, a settlement in Derbyshire, England
  - Pinxton Porcelain
