= Glendale Memorial Park Cemetery =

Historic cemetery in Maricopa County, Arizona

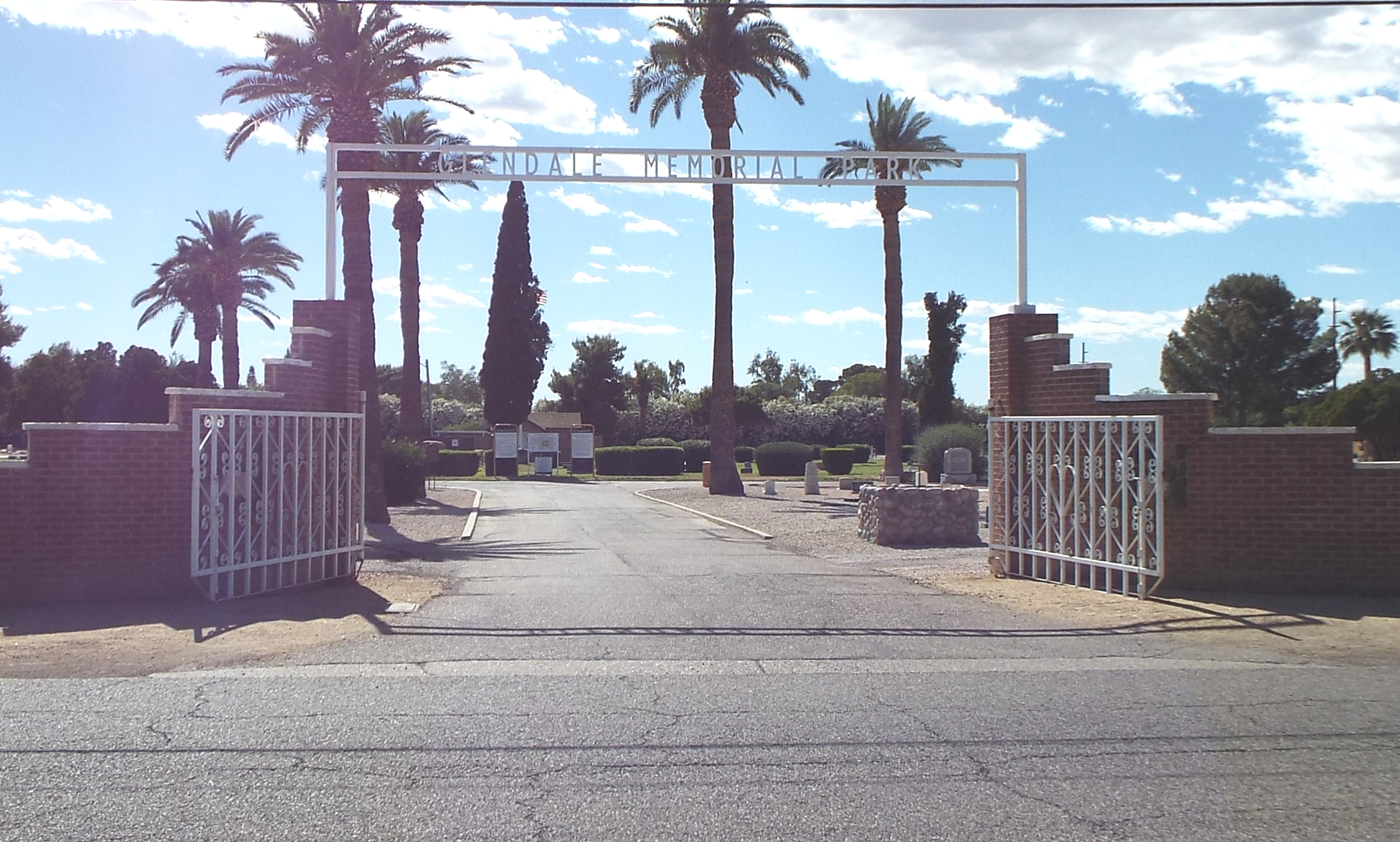
- Main entrance of Glendale Memorial Park Cemetery
- Interactive map of Glendale Memorial Park Cemetery

Details
- Established: 1895
- Location: 7844 North 61st Avenue, Glendale, Arizona
- Country: U.S.
- Coordinates: 33°33′04″N 112°11′30″W
- Owned by: City of Glendale
- Website: Amenities » Glendale Memorial Park Cemetery
- Find a Grave: Glendale Memorial Park Cemetery

The Glendale Memorial Park Cemetery is a historic cemetery located at 7844 North 61st Avenue in Glendale, Arizona. The cemetery was originally called Glendale Memorial Park. It is the final resting place of various notable early citizens of Glendale. Among those who are interred in the cemetery are early pioneers, mayors, businessman and veterans who fought in every military conflict in which the United States has been involved starting from the American Civil War onward. Also, in the cemetery there is a memorial and 16 graves of immigrant farmers who perished in 1959, in a bus accident on Central Avenue.

== History ==
The historic Glendale Memorial Park was founded in 1895, by the settlers of Glendale. It is the oldest cemetery of that city. According to the definition by the Pioneers' Cemetery Association (PCA), a historic cemetery is one which has been in existence for more than fifty years. The cemetery serves as the final resting place of many of Glendale's residents, Civil War Veterans and early pioneers. In 1900, the Glendale Cemetery Association, an organization formed by three Glendale churches, purchased 21 acres of land in 61st and Northern Avenues, which included the Glendale Memorial Park. The Association formally established the new cemetery which they named the Glendale Memorial Park Cemetery. In 1962, the cemetery was turned over to the city of Glendale. The city has the responsibility of the maintaining the grounds and overall daily operations of the cemetery.

== Notable interments ==
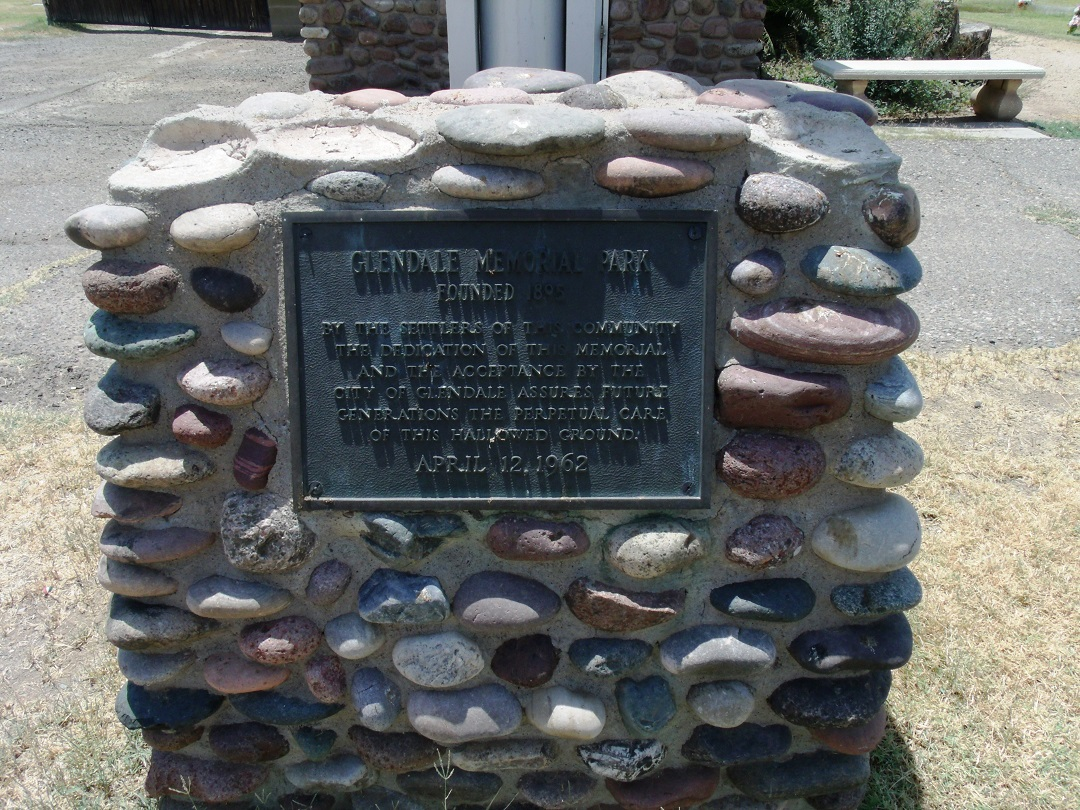
Historical 1895 marker

Among the notable people interred in the cemetery are mayors, educators, various business pioneers, settlers whose houses are in Glendale's historical list, a member of the Woodmen of the World, a recipient of the Medal of Honor, a couple who were the first residents of Peoria, Arizona and 16 Mexican Nationals who died in a bus accident in 1959.

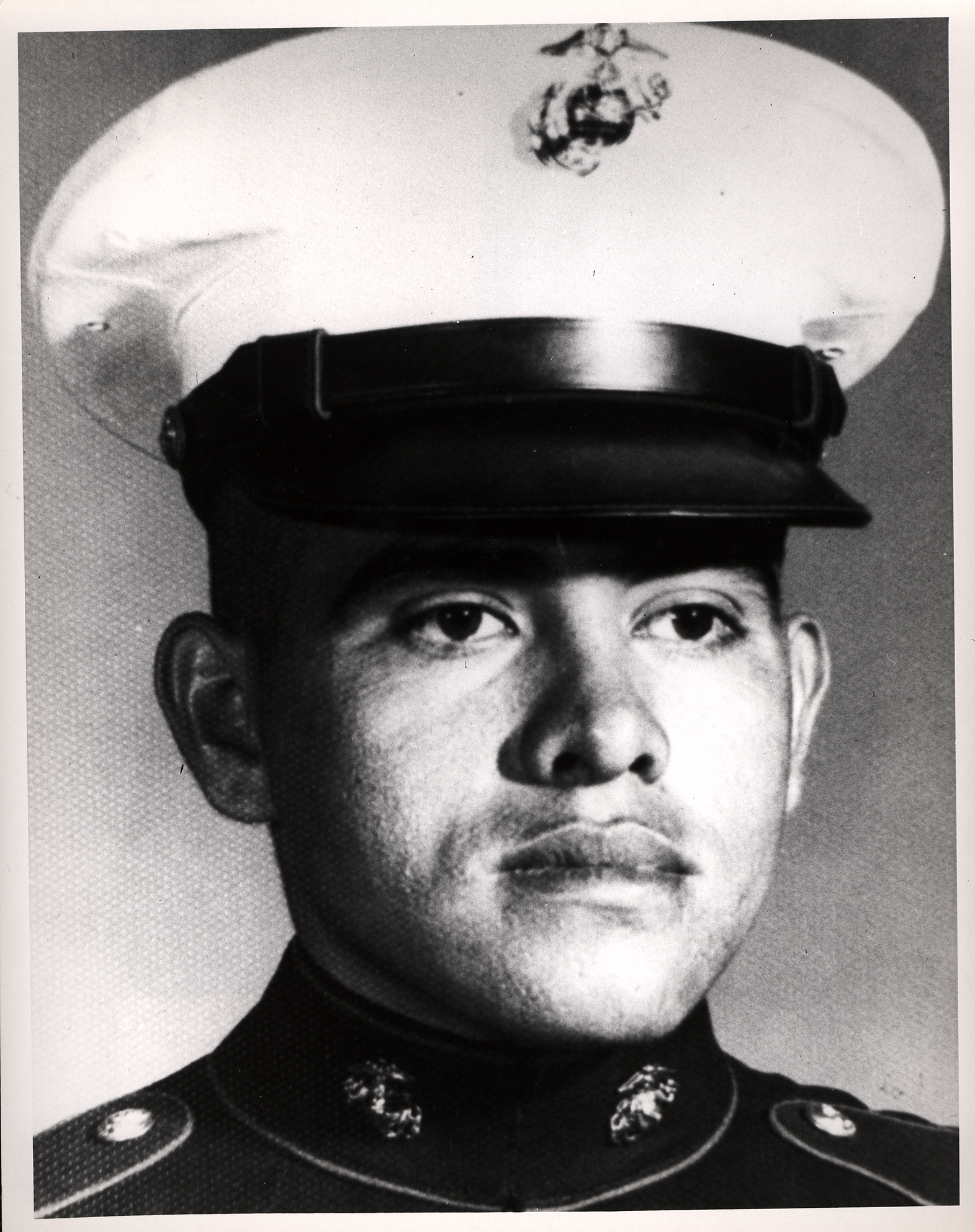
L/Cpl. Jose Francisco Jimenez

- Jose Francisco Jimenez, L/Cpl. (1946–1969) – Jimenez was a member of the United States Marine Corps, Company K, 3rd Battalion, 7th Marines, 1st Marine Division who was posthumously awarded the Congressional Medal of Honor.
- Ova Darling Betts (1868–1950) – Betts served as Mayor of Glendale from 1922 to 1930. His wife, Mamie Betts, is buried alongside of him.
- Issac Imes (1892–1956) – Imes was a Marine who fought in World War I. He lived in Glendale and became a teacher. He later served as principal in the Glendale Elementary School District. Glendale honored Ames by naming a school in his honor after his death. Buried next to him is his wife, Harriette Imes (1894–1952).
- William E. Kalas (1884–1968), M.D. – Kalas once served as Mayor of Glendale. His house, located at 5811 West State Street, is within the Glendale Townsite Catlin Court Historic District which is listed in the National Register of Historic Places (NRHP). Buried alongside of William Kalas is his wife, Olga Kalas (1896–1991).
- Emitt Marlow (1900–1919) – Marlow was a member of the Woodmen of the World. The Woodmen of the World is the largest fraternal benefit society with open membership in the United States.
- John Maxwell Pearson (1885–1934) – Pearson was a medical doctor who served as Mayor of Glendale in 1914, three years prior to Arizona becoming a state.
- Julio Sancet (1880–1961) – Sanchet was a local rancher. His house is located at 7158 North 57th Avenue within the Glendale Townsite Catlin Court Historic District, which is listed in the NRHP.
- Louis Sands (1875–1941) – Sands was involved in the timber industry. He was a native of Michigan who moved to Glendale and founded the Manistee Ranch.
- Louis Sands Jr. (1908–1975) – Sands Jr. was the founder of Sands Dealership, the largest car dealership in Glendale.
- Melvin E. Sine (1907–1987) – Sine was an educator and school principal. Glendale honored his memory by naming a school after him. His wife, Eva (1910–2002), is buried alongside of him. His house is within the Glendale Gardens Historic District listed in the NRHP (ref. 11001073).
- Tucker J. Sine (1879–1942) – Sine was a member of the Sine family, founders of many business in Glendale, including the Sine Hardware Co. His wife, Mary Grace Sine (1881–1966), is also buried there.
- Albert J. Straw (1858–1935) and Elizabeth Straw (1860–1952) – The Straws were immigrants from Pinxton, England who, in November 1886, established the first residency in what was to become the town of Peoria, Arizona.
- William Weigold (1852–1923) – Wiegold is one of Glendale's early pioneers and one of the first directors of the Glendale State Bank. His house, located at 6101 West Palmarie Avenue, is listed as historical by the Glendale Historic Society.
- William F. Weigold (1886–1954) – Wiegold was one of Glendale's early pioneers and the son of William Weigold.
- Verne Whitney (1896–1971) – Whitney was a rural mail carrier whose house is located within the Glendale Townsite Catlin Court Historic District which is listed in the NRHP. His wife, Ada M. Whitney (1901–1981), is buried alongside of him.
- Bus Crash Memorial – There is a stone memorial dedicated to the 32 farm workers who perished in a bus crash in 1959, near Central Avenue and Baseline Road. Long concrete blocks lie in a row where 16 of the Mexican Nationals who died in the crash are buried.

== Graves ==
Historic Glendale Memorial Park Cemetery

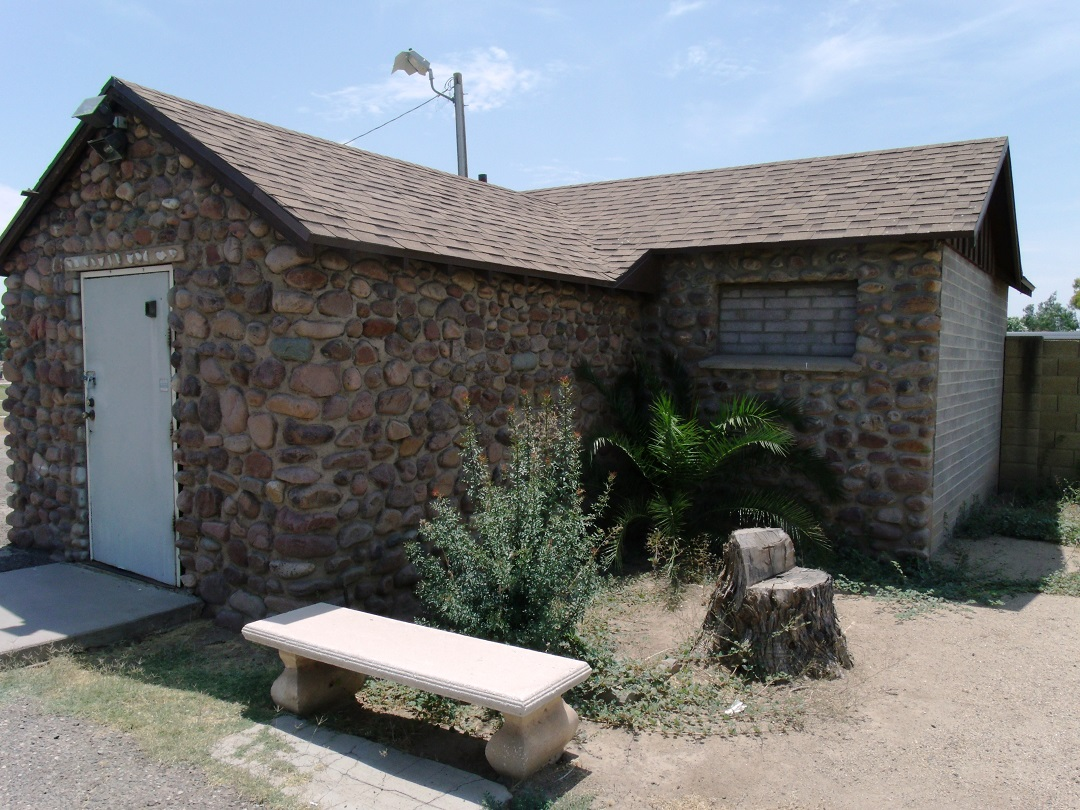
The Caretakers’ House, (built in 1895)

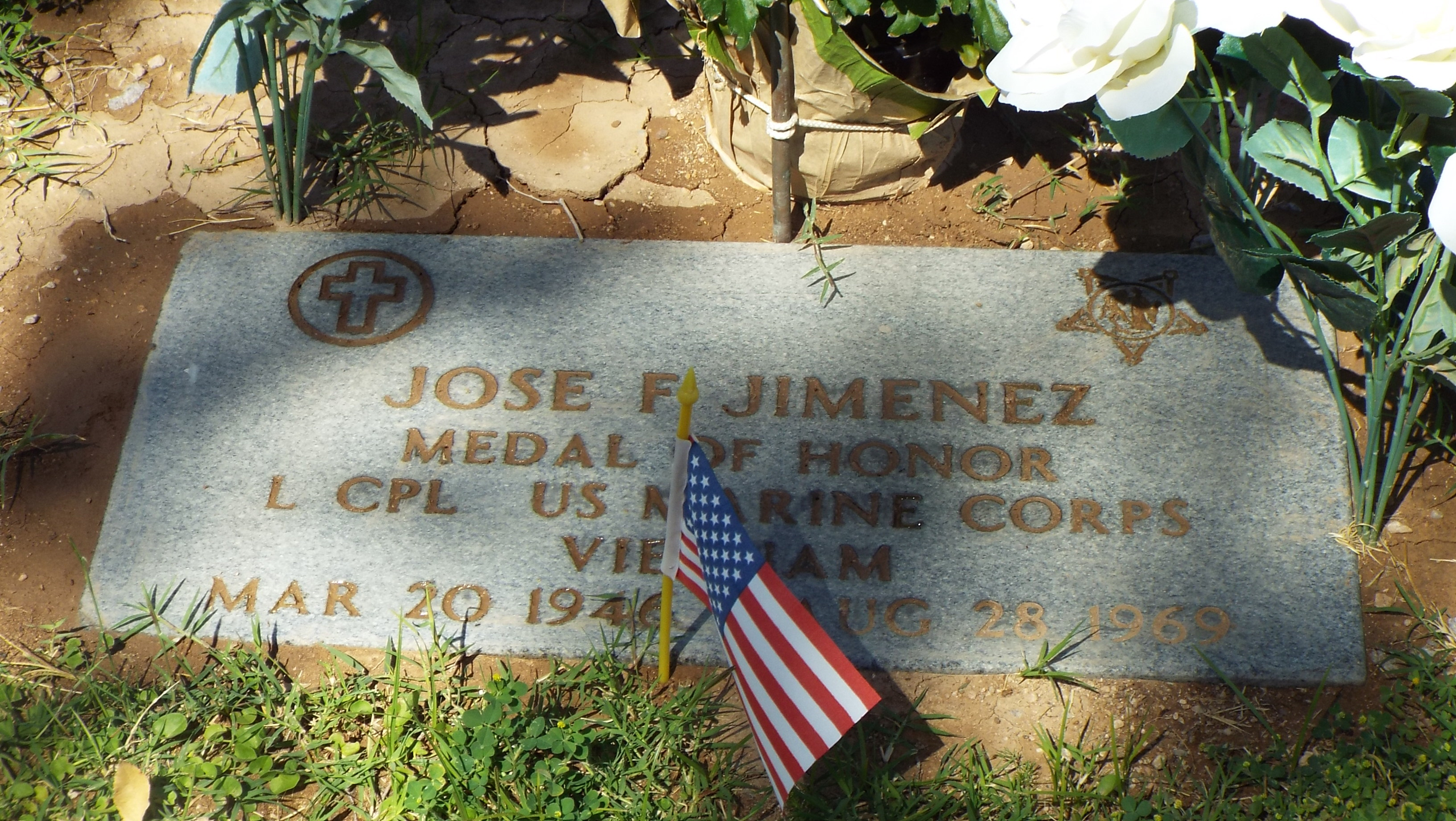
Grave of L/Cpl.Jose Francisco Jimenez (1946–1968).

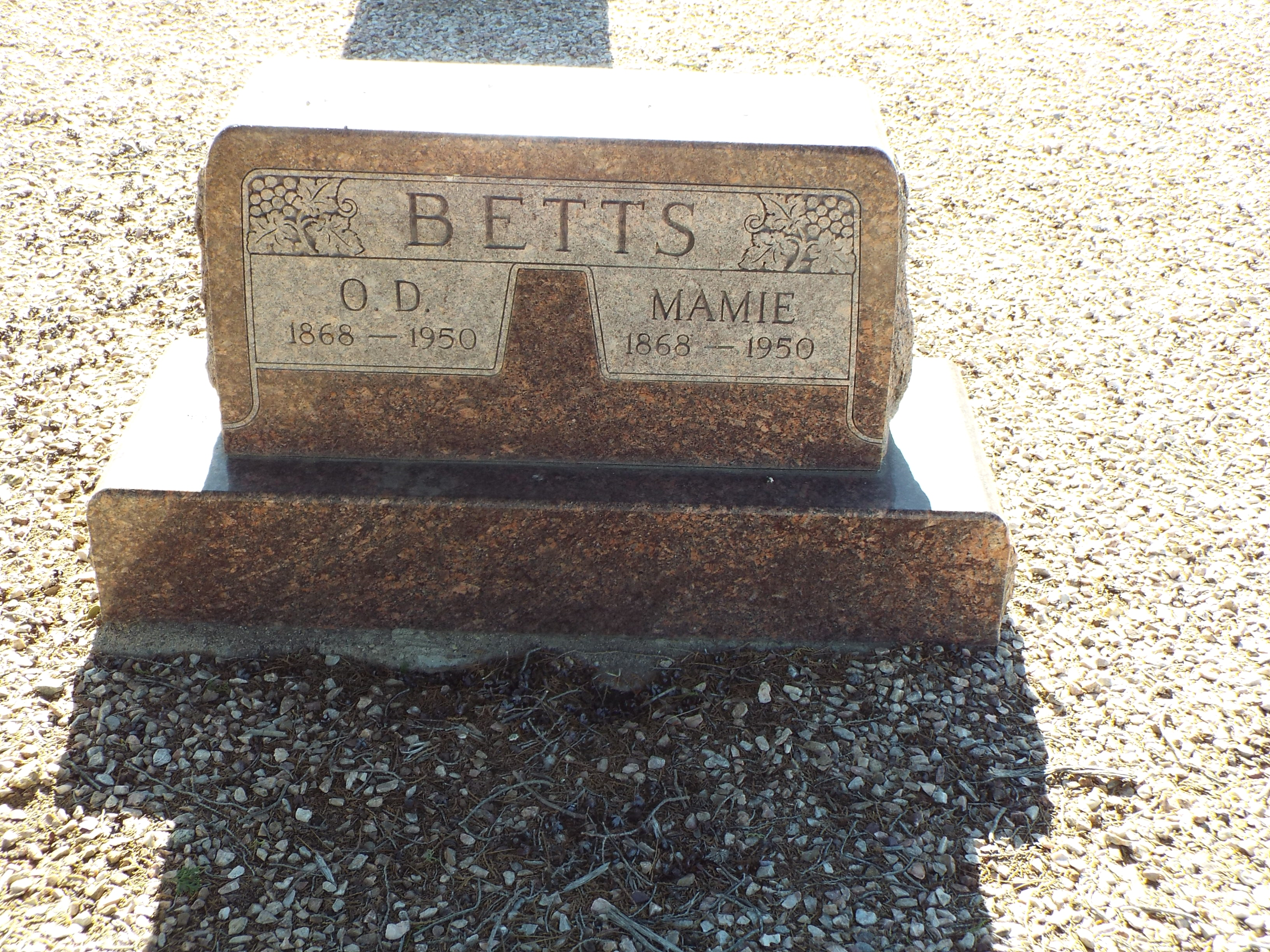
Grave of Ova Darling Betts (1868–1950) and Mamie Betts.

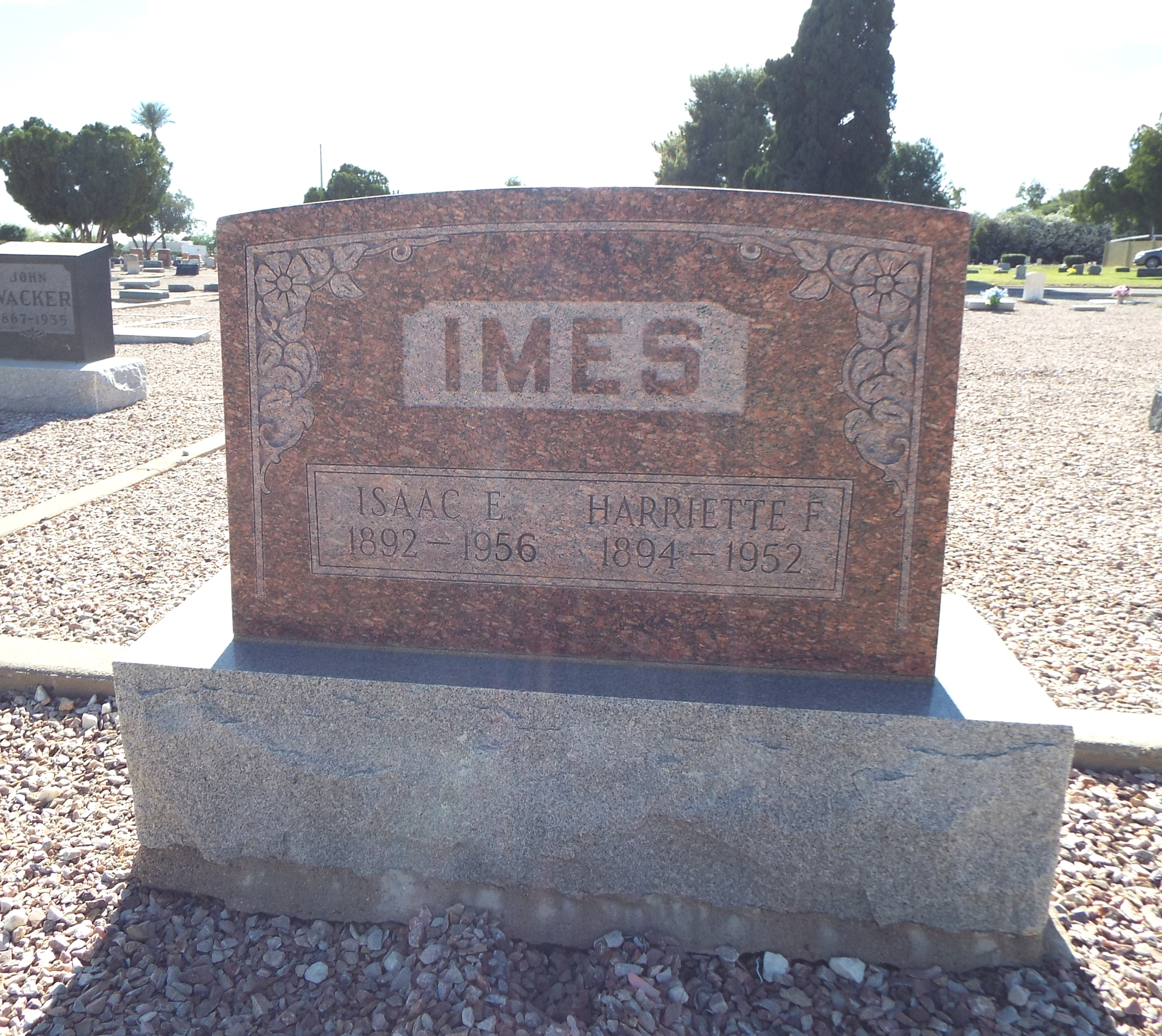
Grave of Issac Imes (1892–1956) and Harriette Imes (1894–1952).

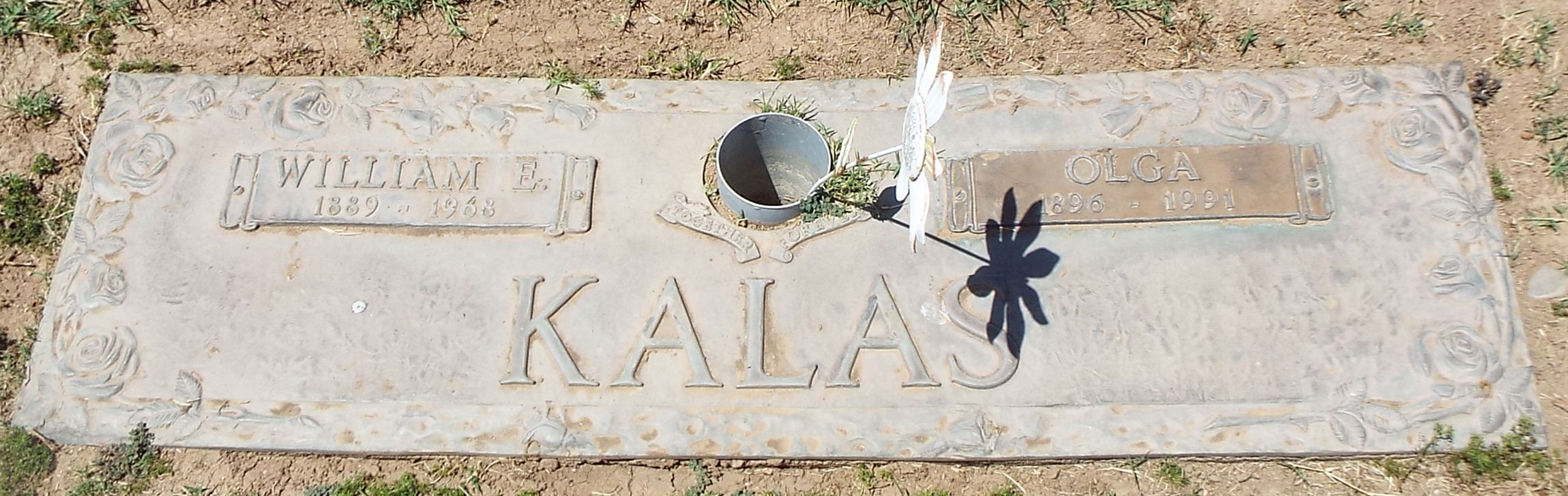
Grave of William E. Kalas (1889–1968) and Olga Kalas (1896–1991).

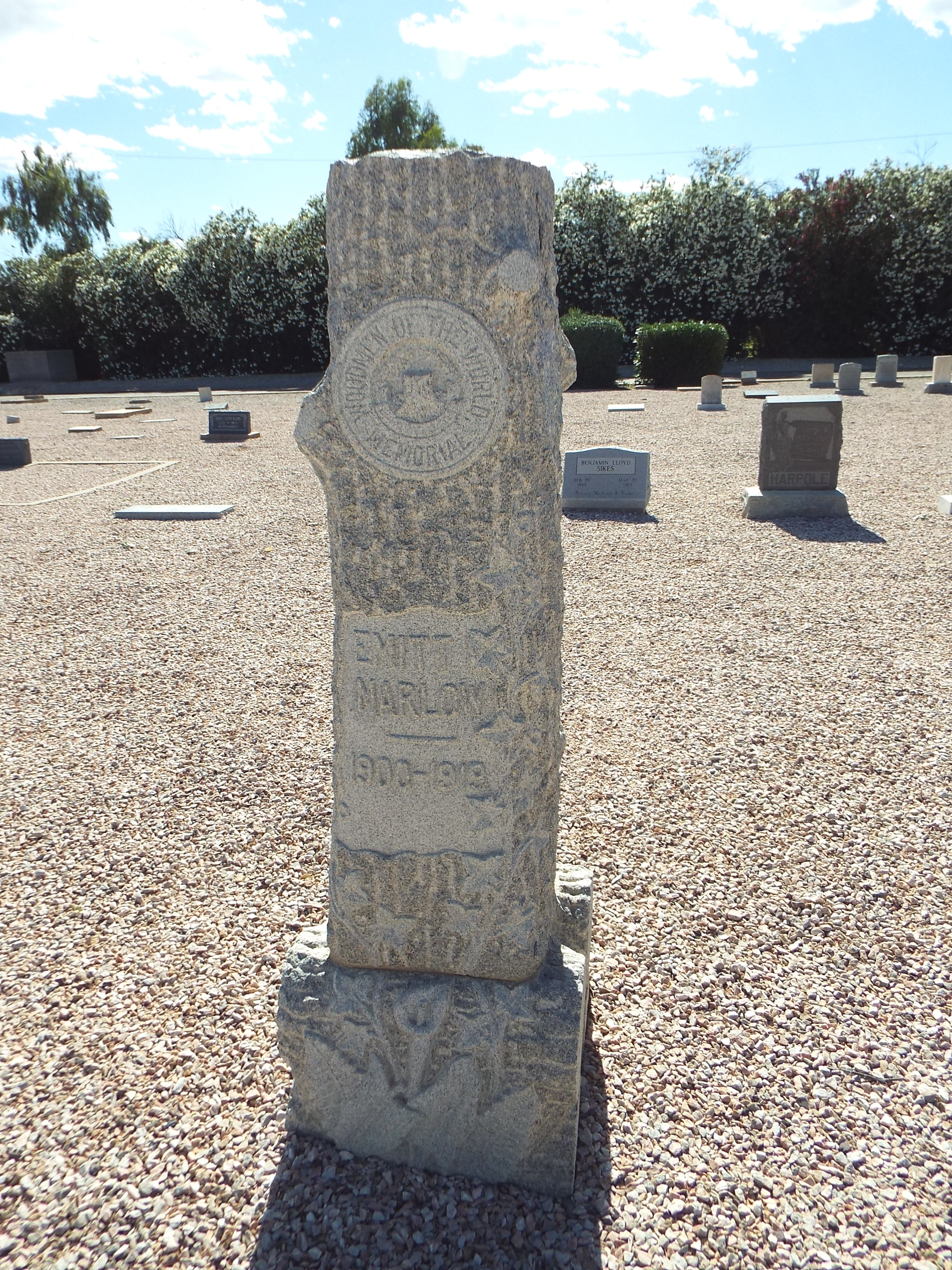
Grave of Emitt Marlow (1900–1919).

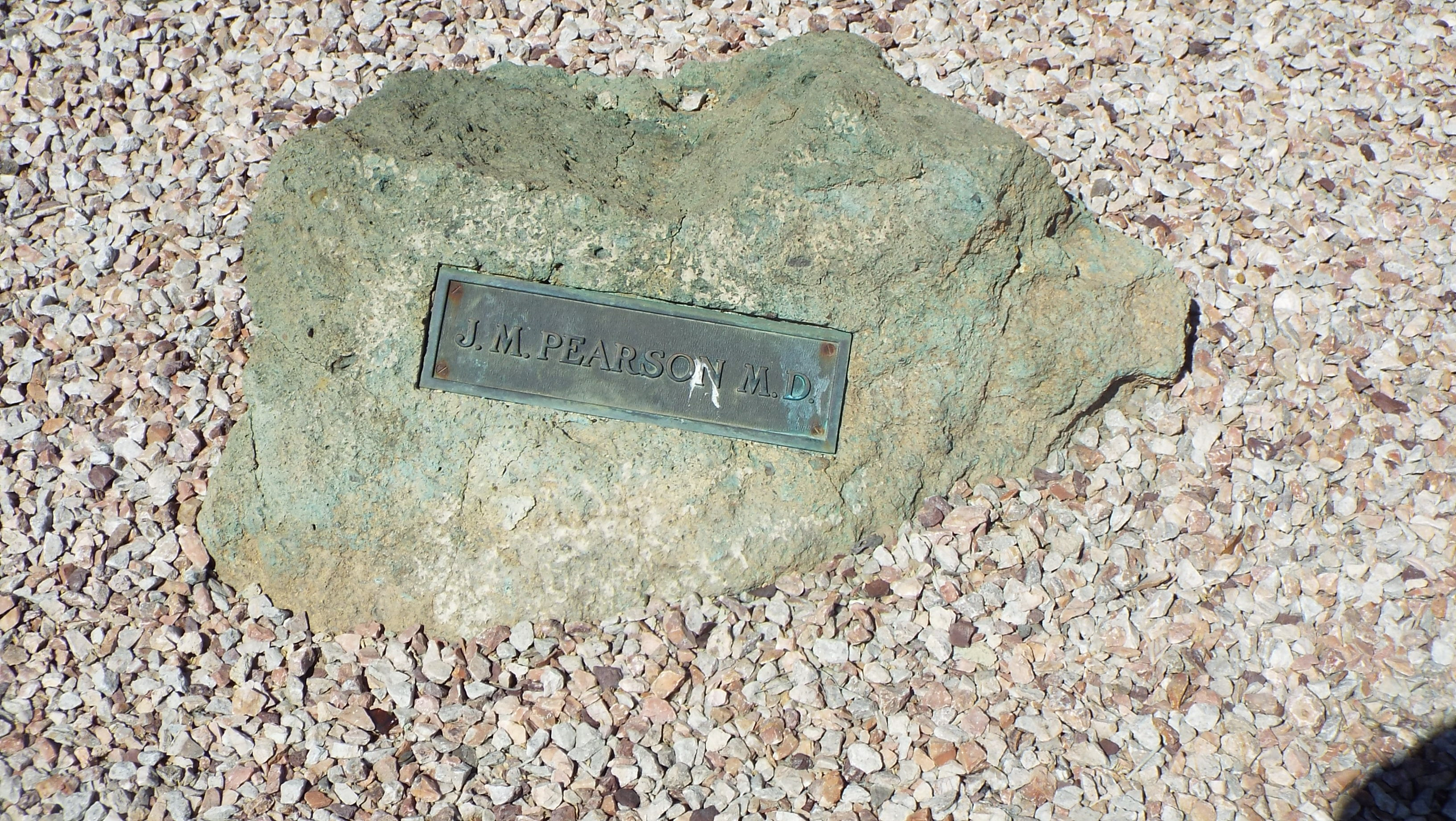
Grave of John Maxwell Pearson (1885–1934).

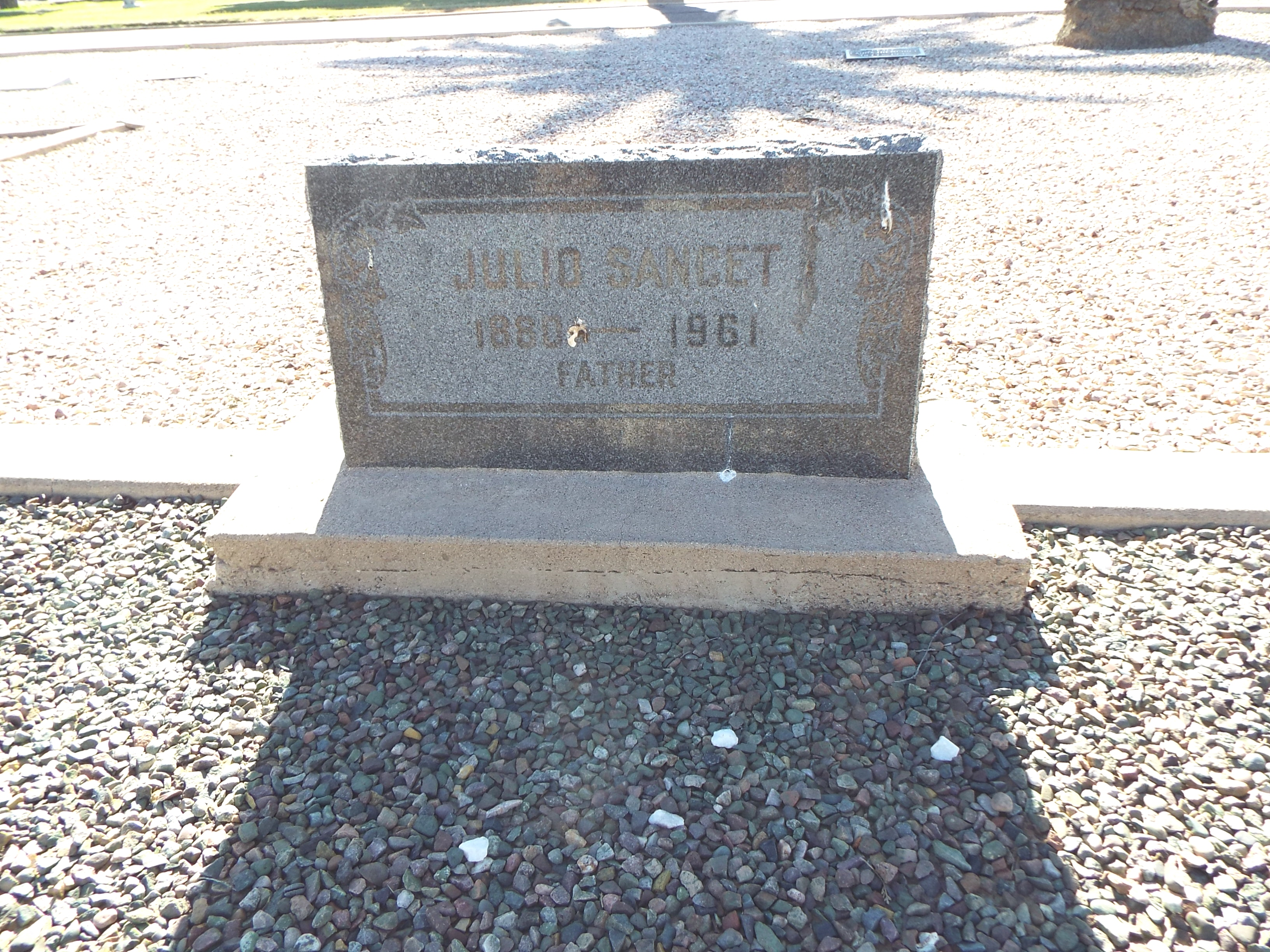
Grave of Julio Sancet (1880–1961).

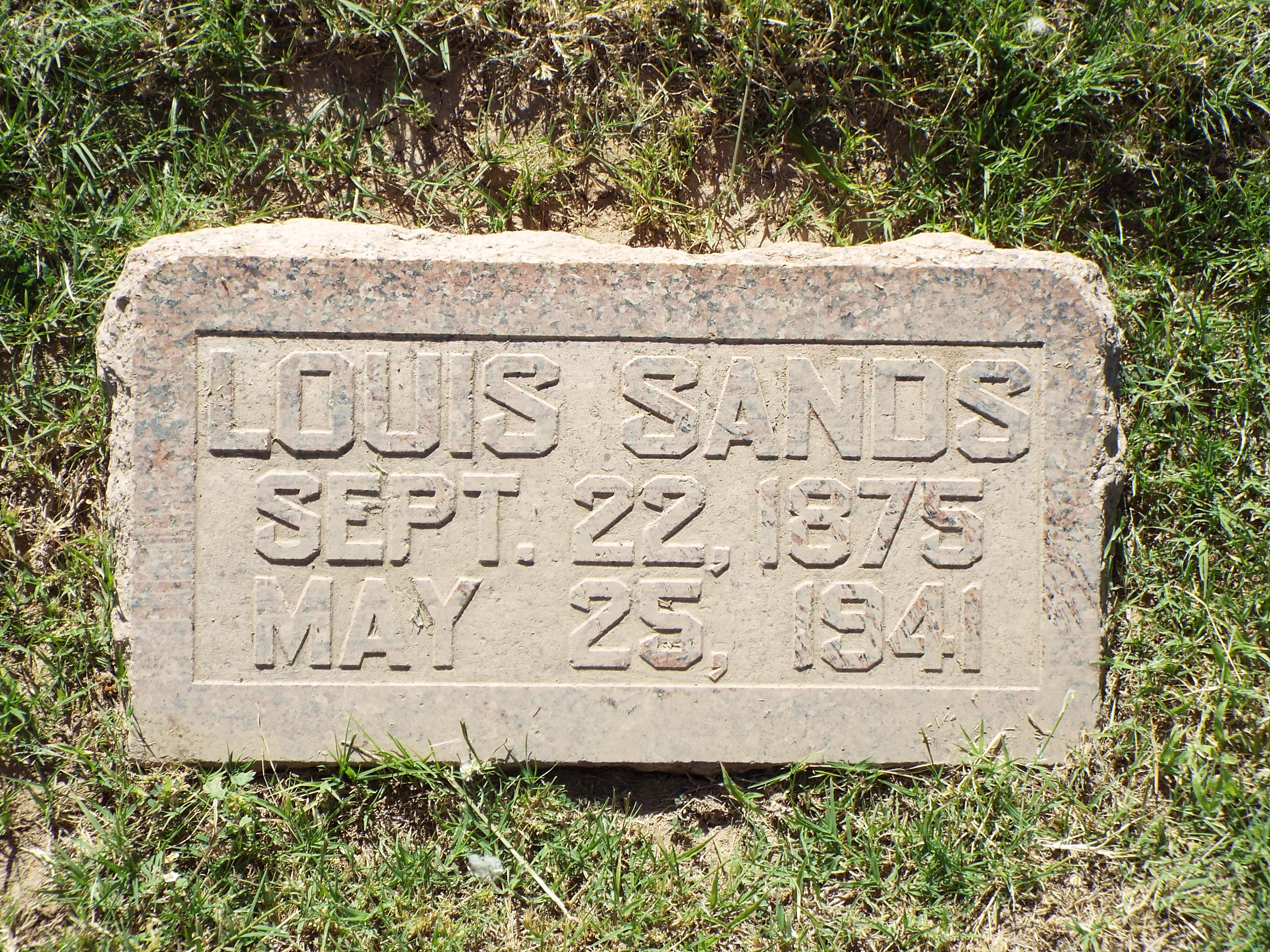
Grave of Louis Sands (1875–1941).

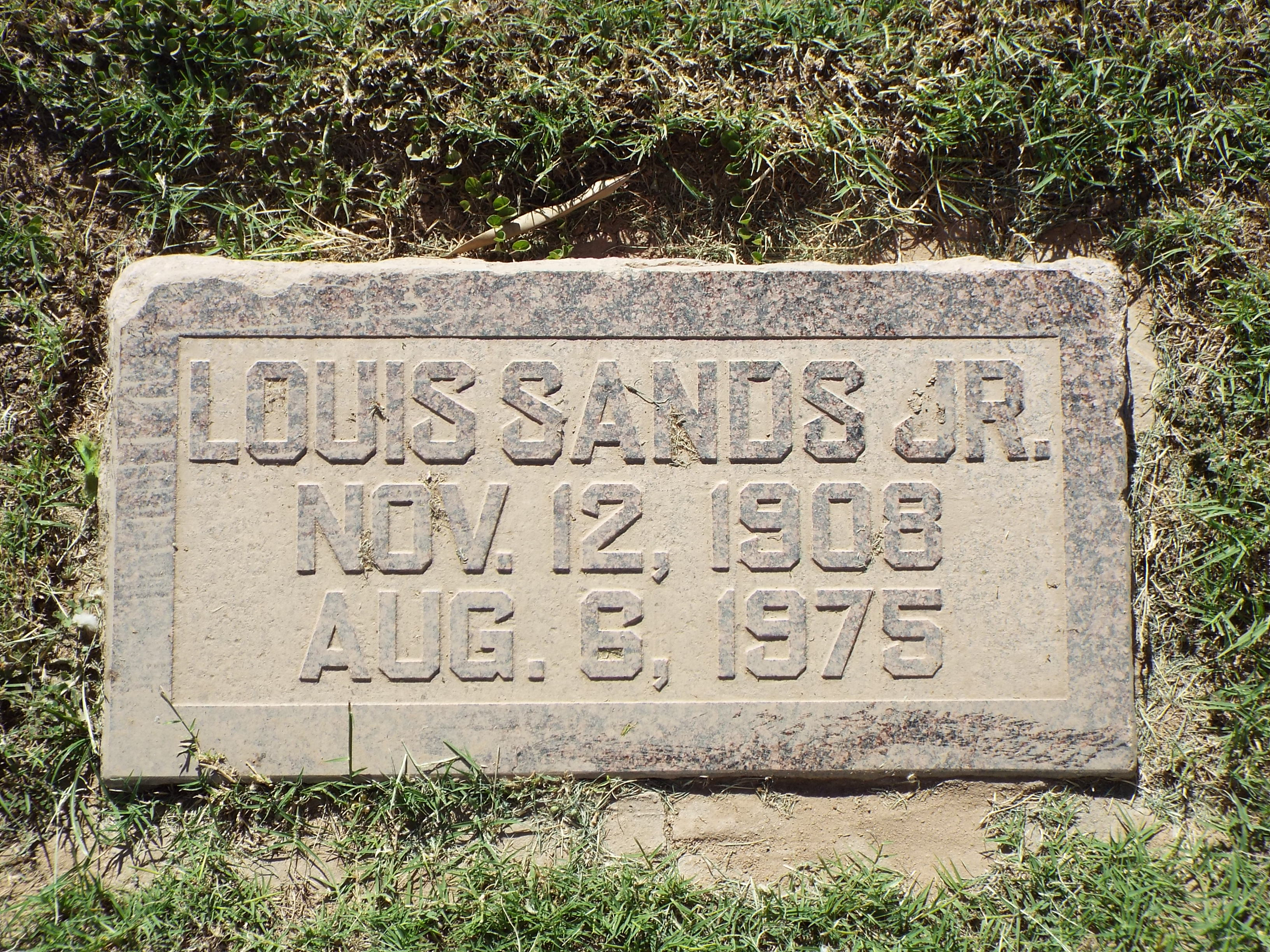
Grave of Louis Sands Jr. (1908–1975).

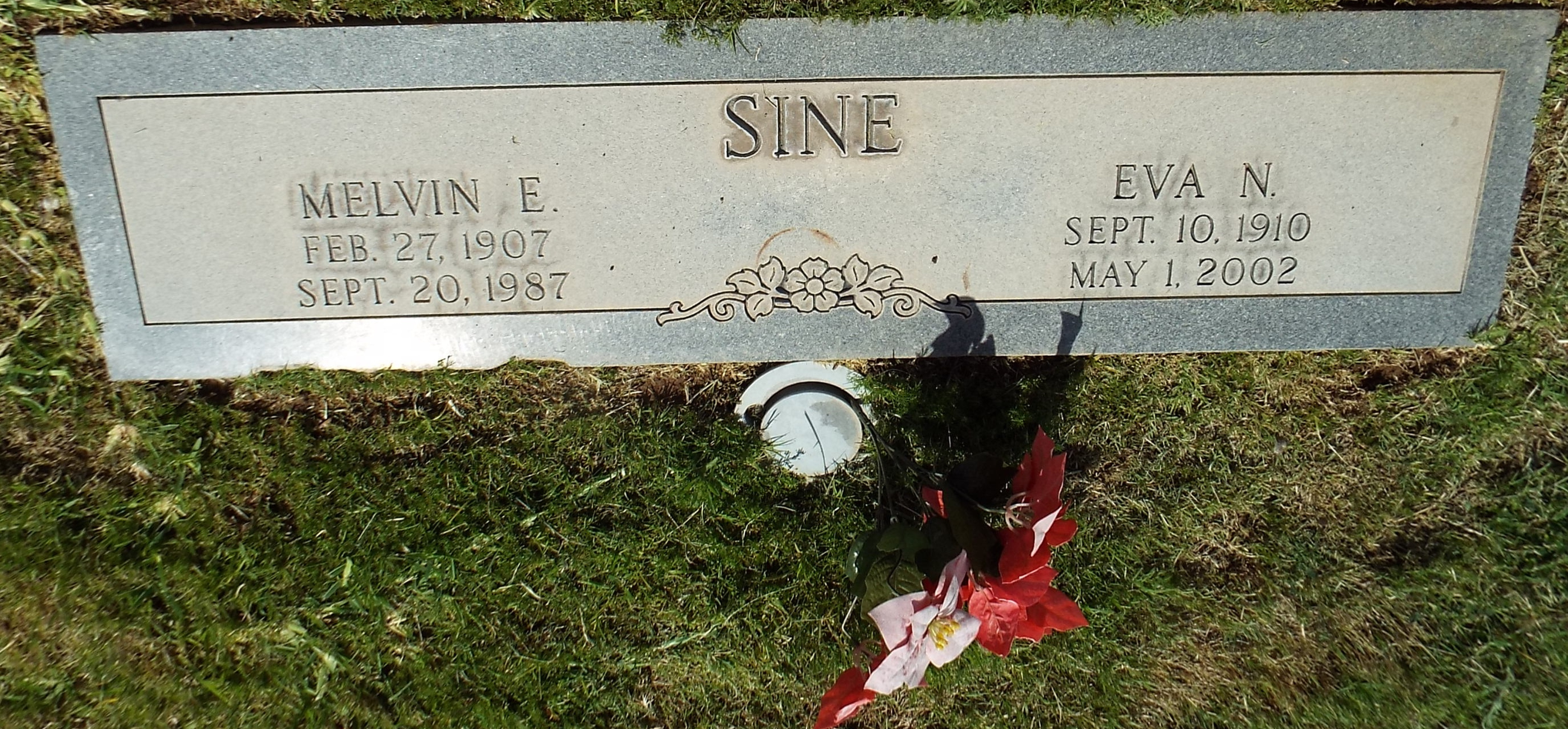
Grave of Melvin E. Sine (1907–1987) and Eva Sine (1910–2002).

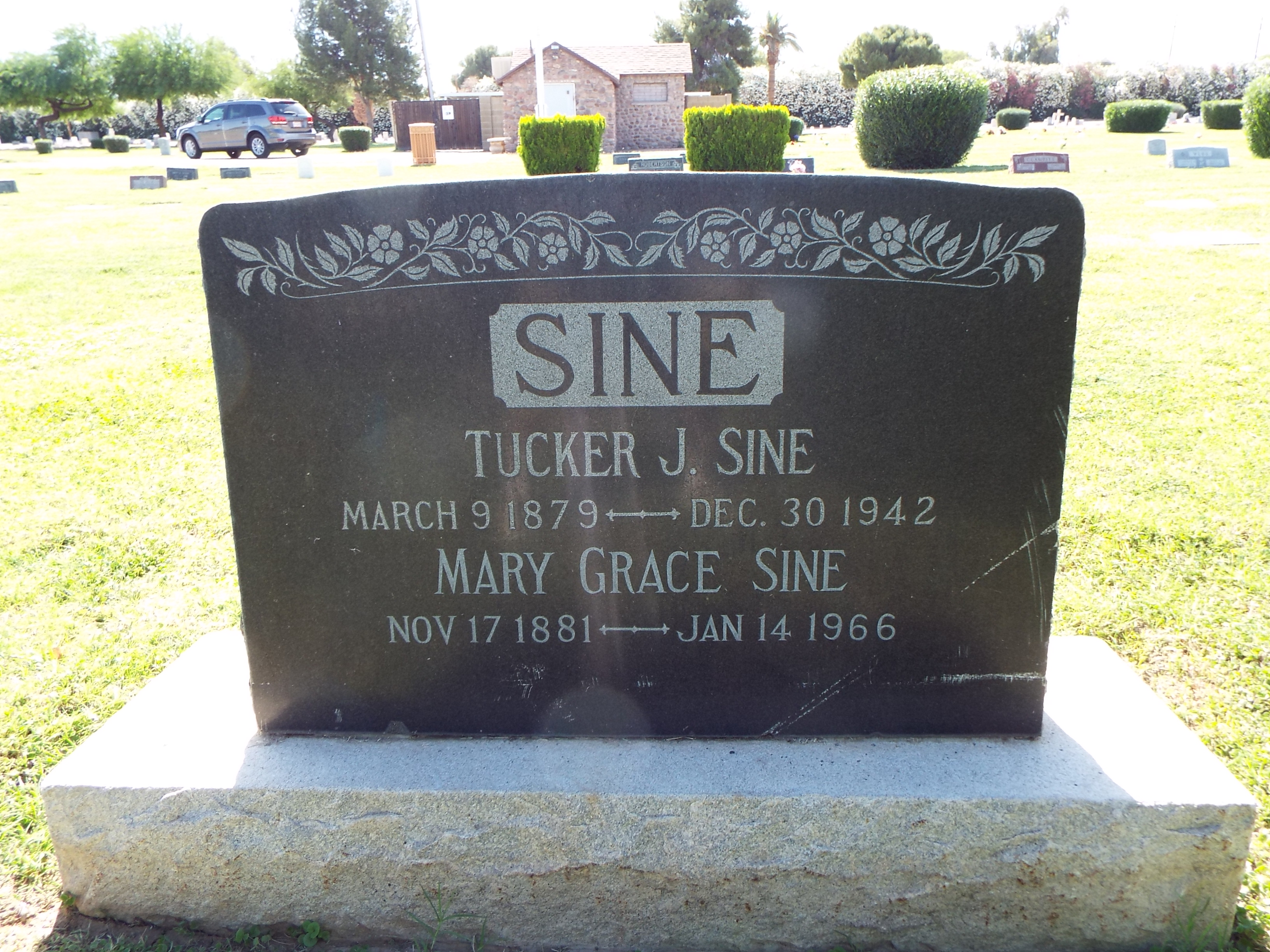
Grave of Tucker J. Sine (1879–1942) and Mary Grace Sine (1881–1966).

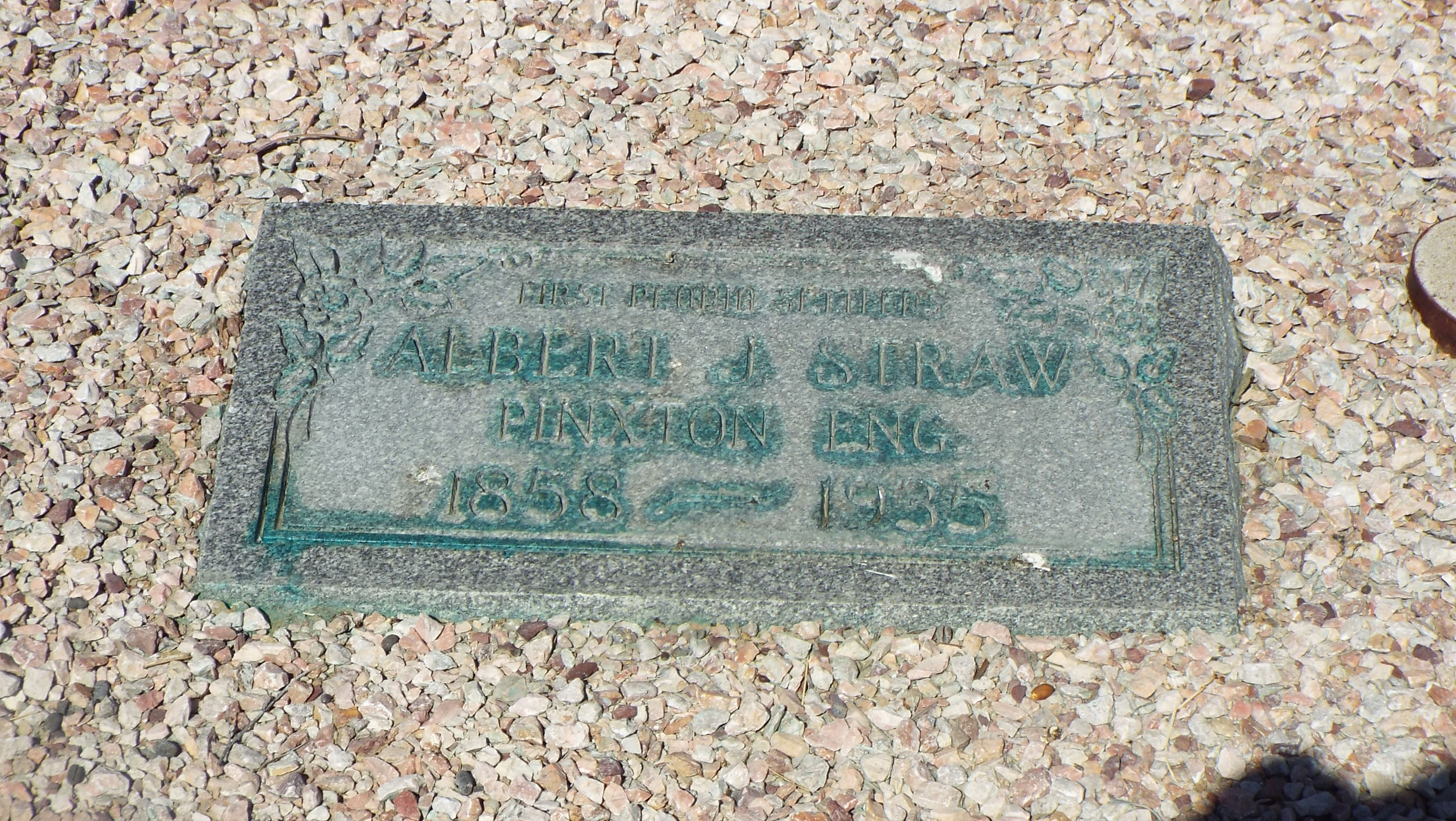
Grave of Albert J. Straw (1858–1935).

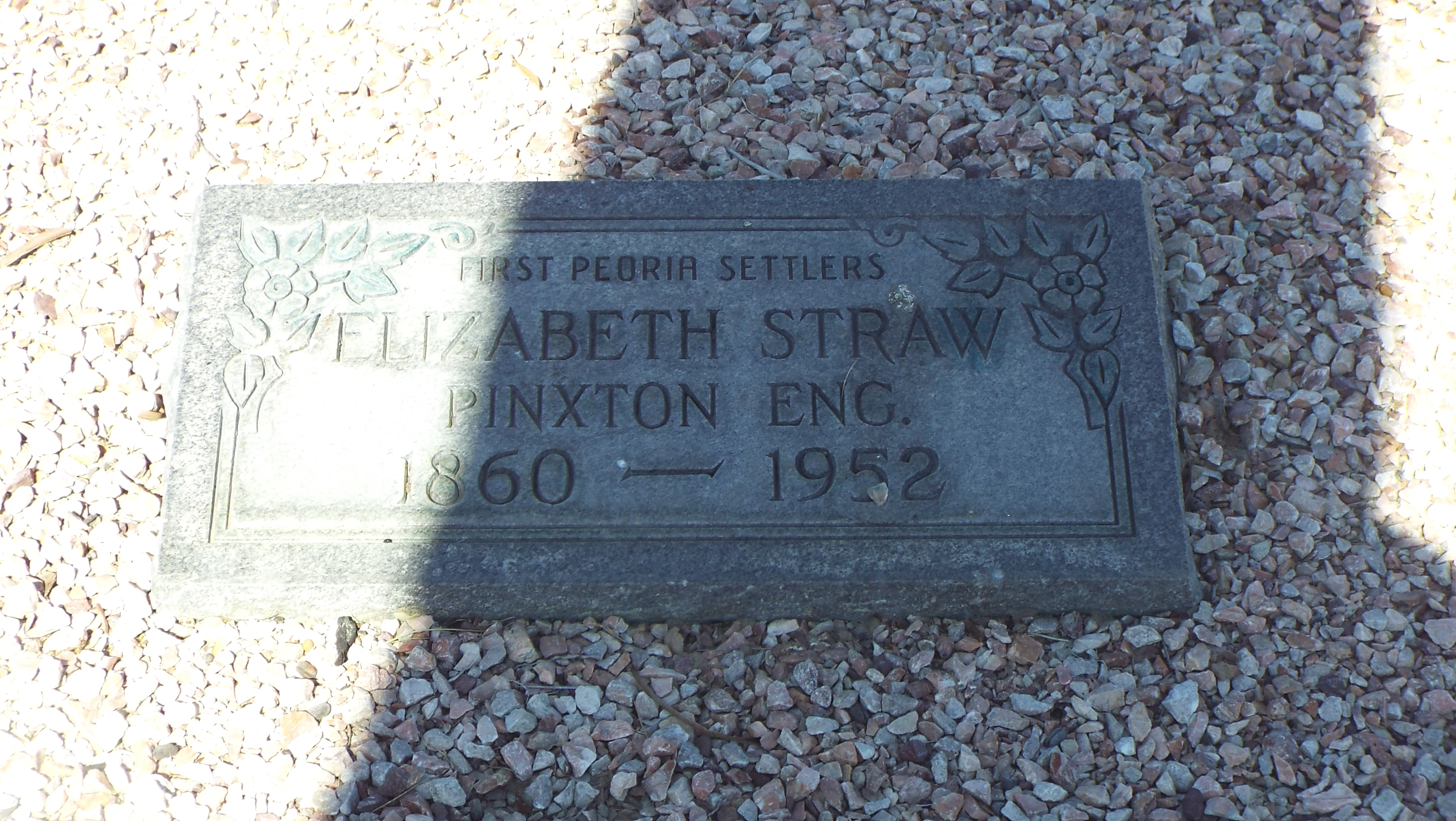
Grave of Elizabeth Straw (1860–1952).

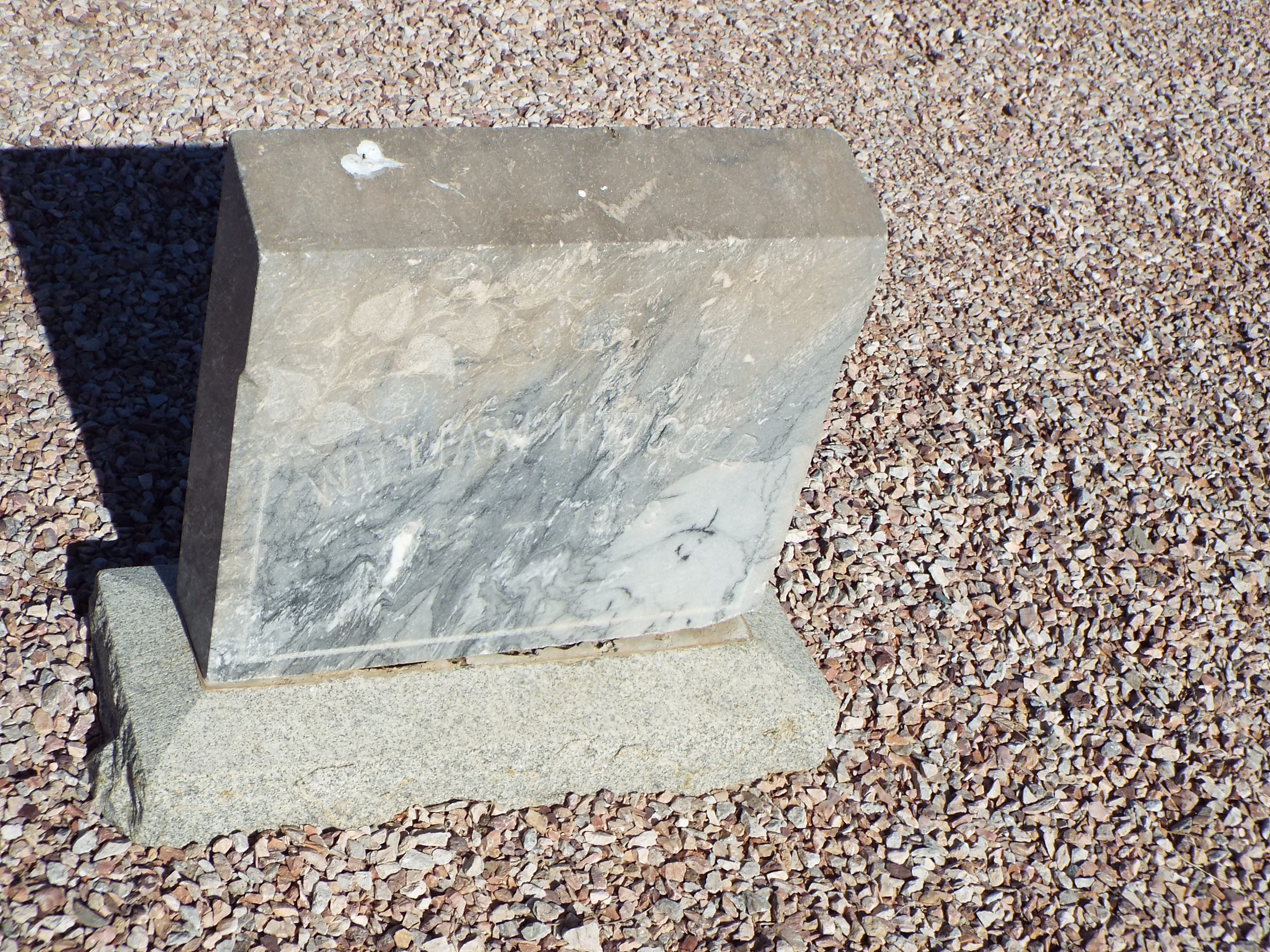
Grave of William Weigold (1852–1923).

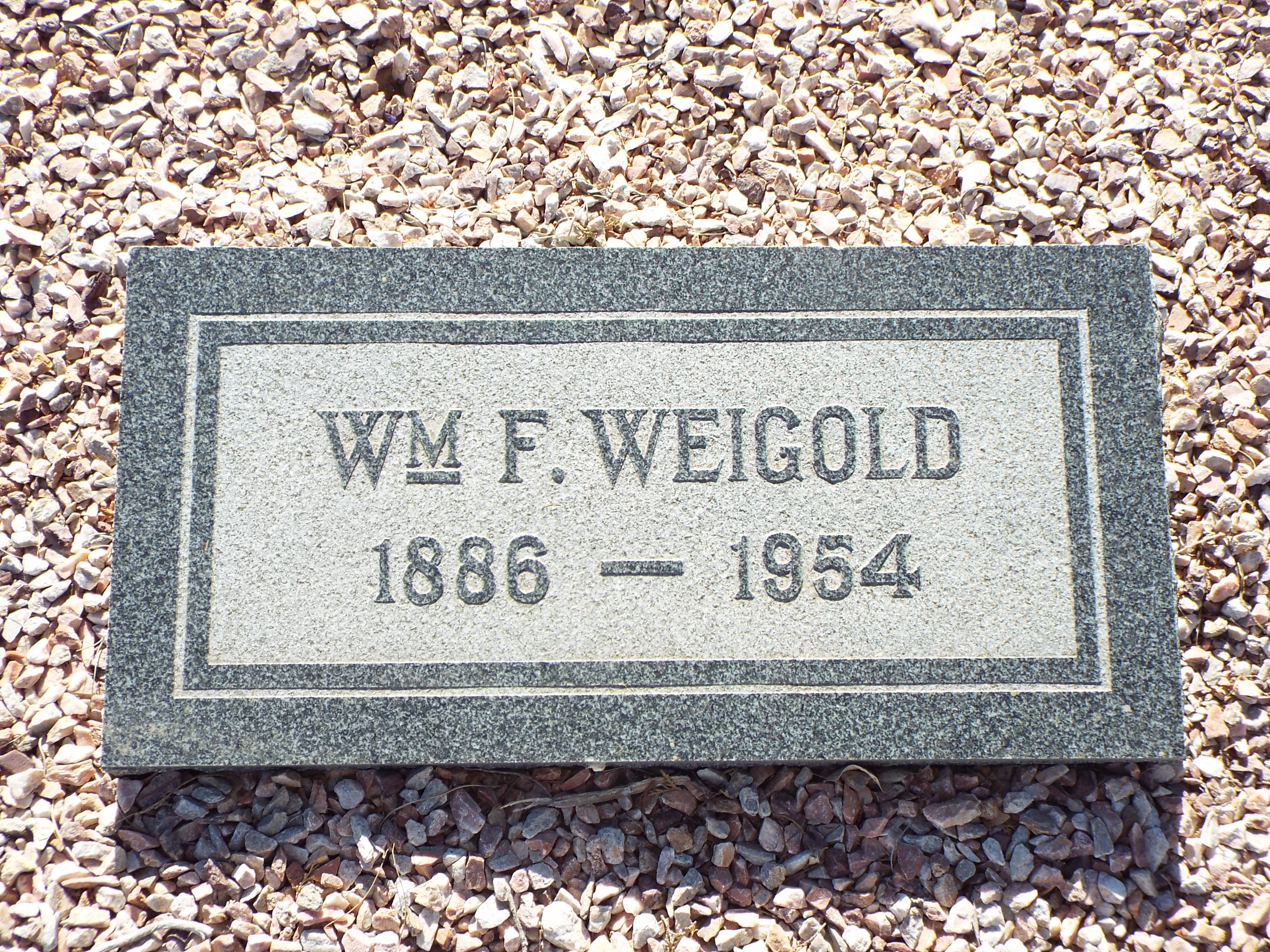
Grave of William F. Weigold (1886–1954).

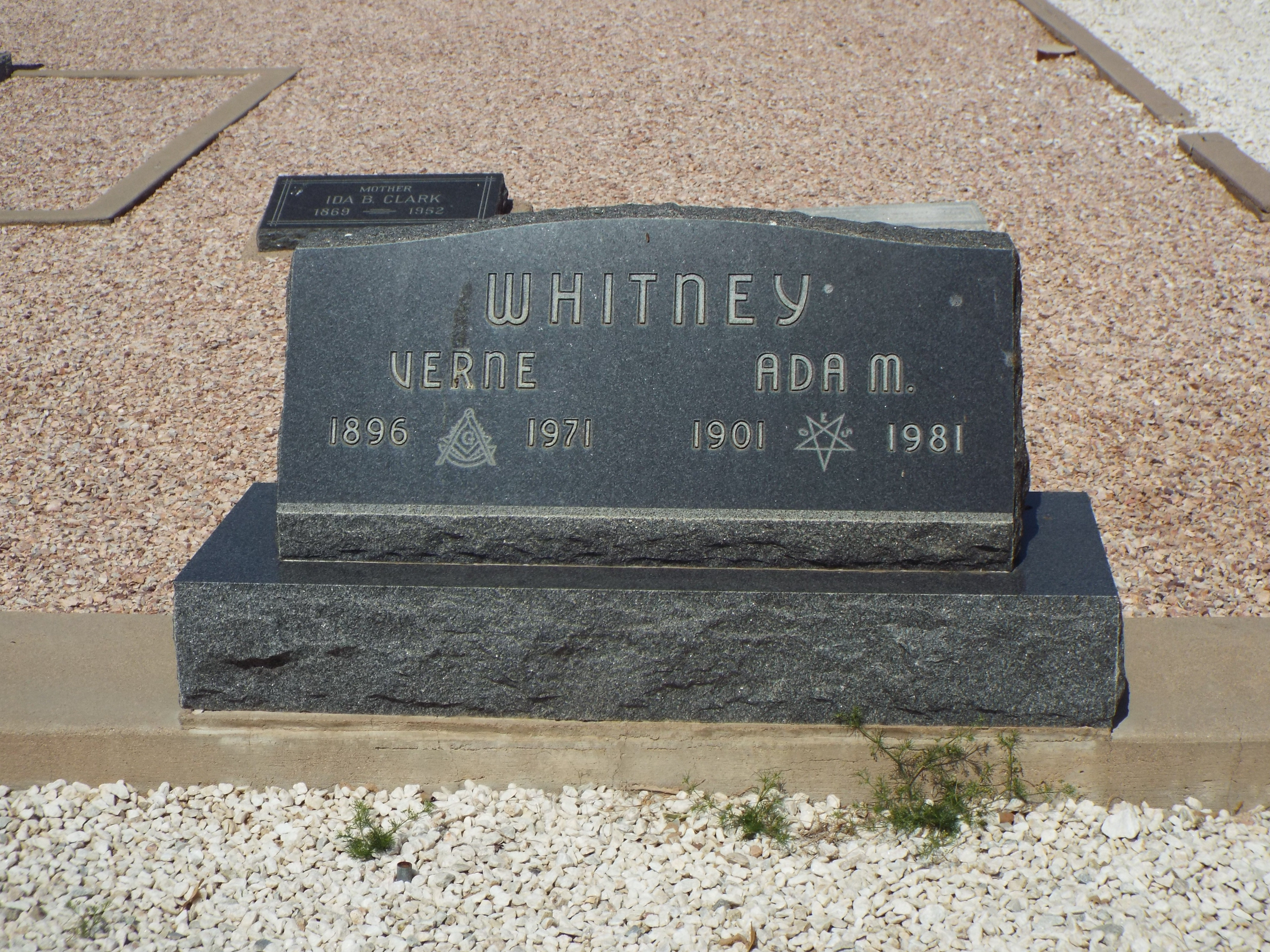
Grave of Verne Whitney (1896–1971) and Ada M. Whitney (1901–1981).

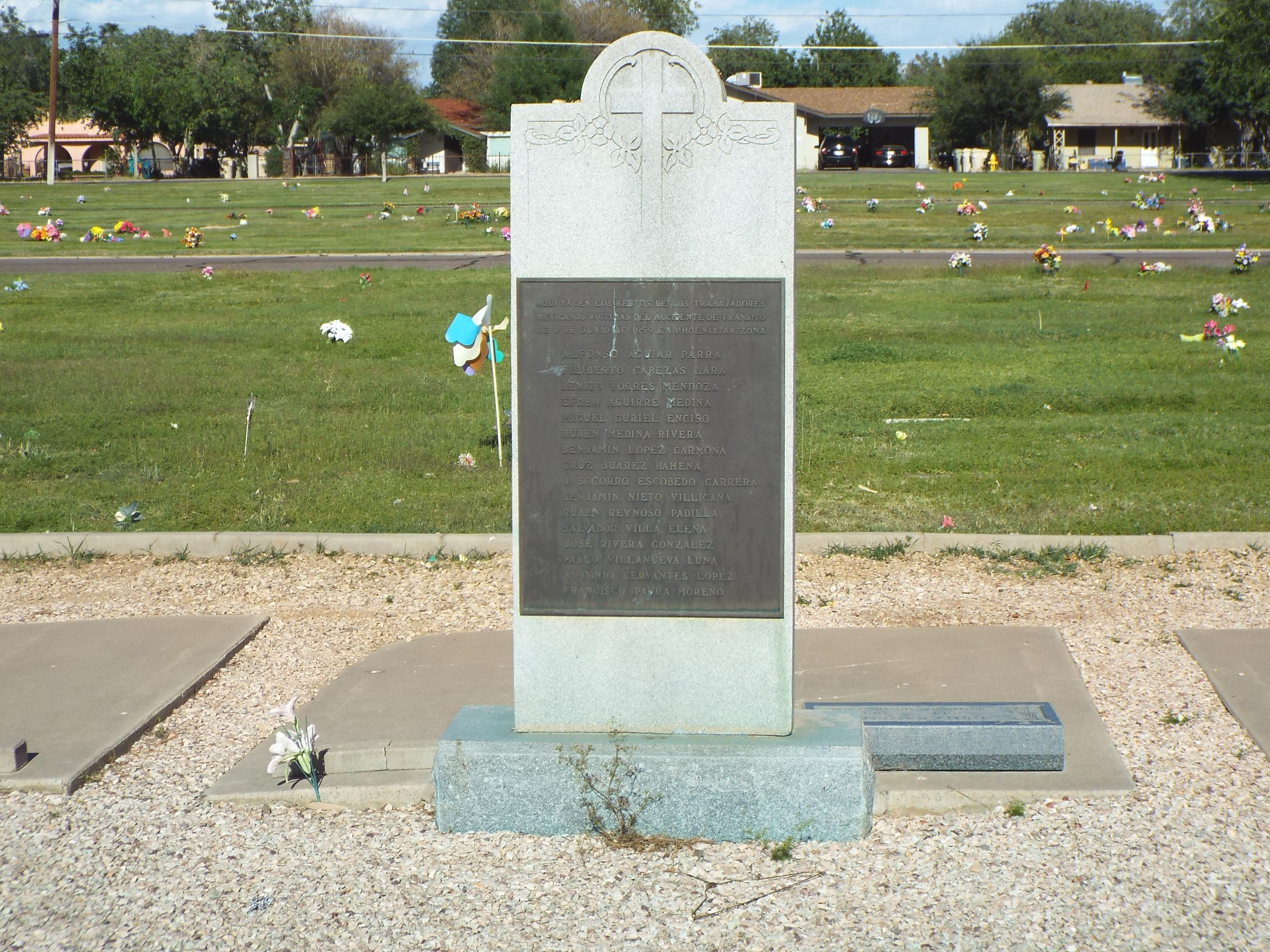
Monument dedicated to the victims of the 1959 Bus Accident.

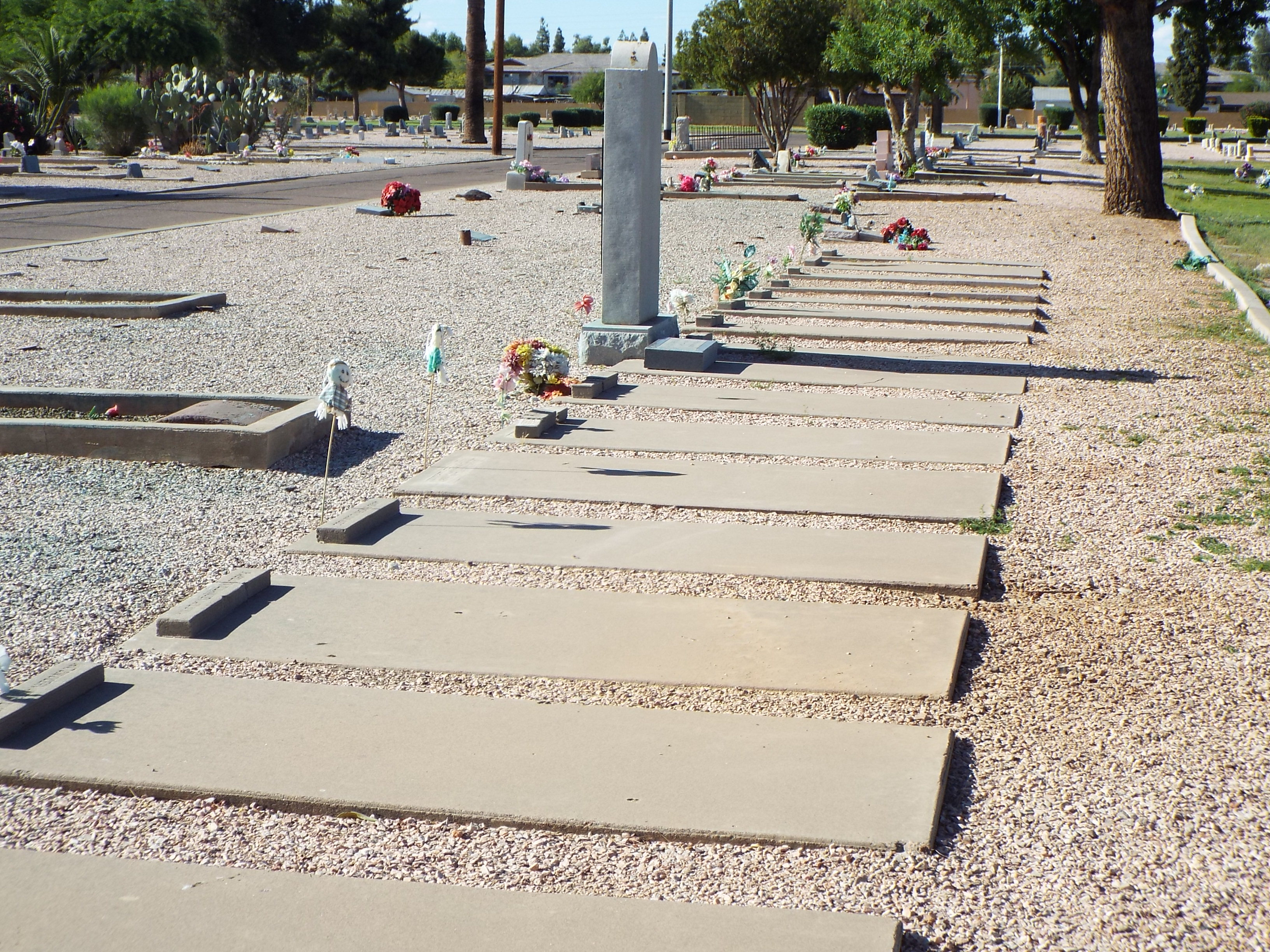
The graves of the victims of the 1959 Bus Accident.

== See also ==
- List of historic properties in Glendale, Arizona
- Adamsville A.O.U.W. Cemetery
- Home Mission Cemetery
- City of Mesa Cemetery
- Pioneer and Military Memorial Park
- Goodyear Farms Historic Cemetery
- Double Butte Cemetery
- Greenwood/Memory Lawn Mortuary & Cemetery
- Goodyear Farms Historic Cemetery
- St. Francis Catholic Cemetery
- Historic Pinal Cemetery
- National Register of Historic Places listings in Maricopa County, Arizona
