= Cyril Stocks =

English footballer

Personal information
- Full name: Cyril William Stocks
- Date of birth: 3 May 1905
- Place of birth: Pinxton, England
- Date of death: 1979 (aged 83–84)
- Position: Inside forward

Senior career*
Years	Team	Apps	(Gls)
1921–1922	South Normanton Amateurs		
1922–1923	South Normanton Colliery		
1924–1934	Nottingham Forest	241	(76)
1934	Grantham		
Total		241	(76)
- * Club domestic league appearances and goals

Cyril William Stocks (3 May 1905 – 1989) was an English footballer who played in the Football League for Nottingham Forest.
