= Pinxton Porcelain =

Pottery works in Derbyshire, England

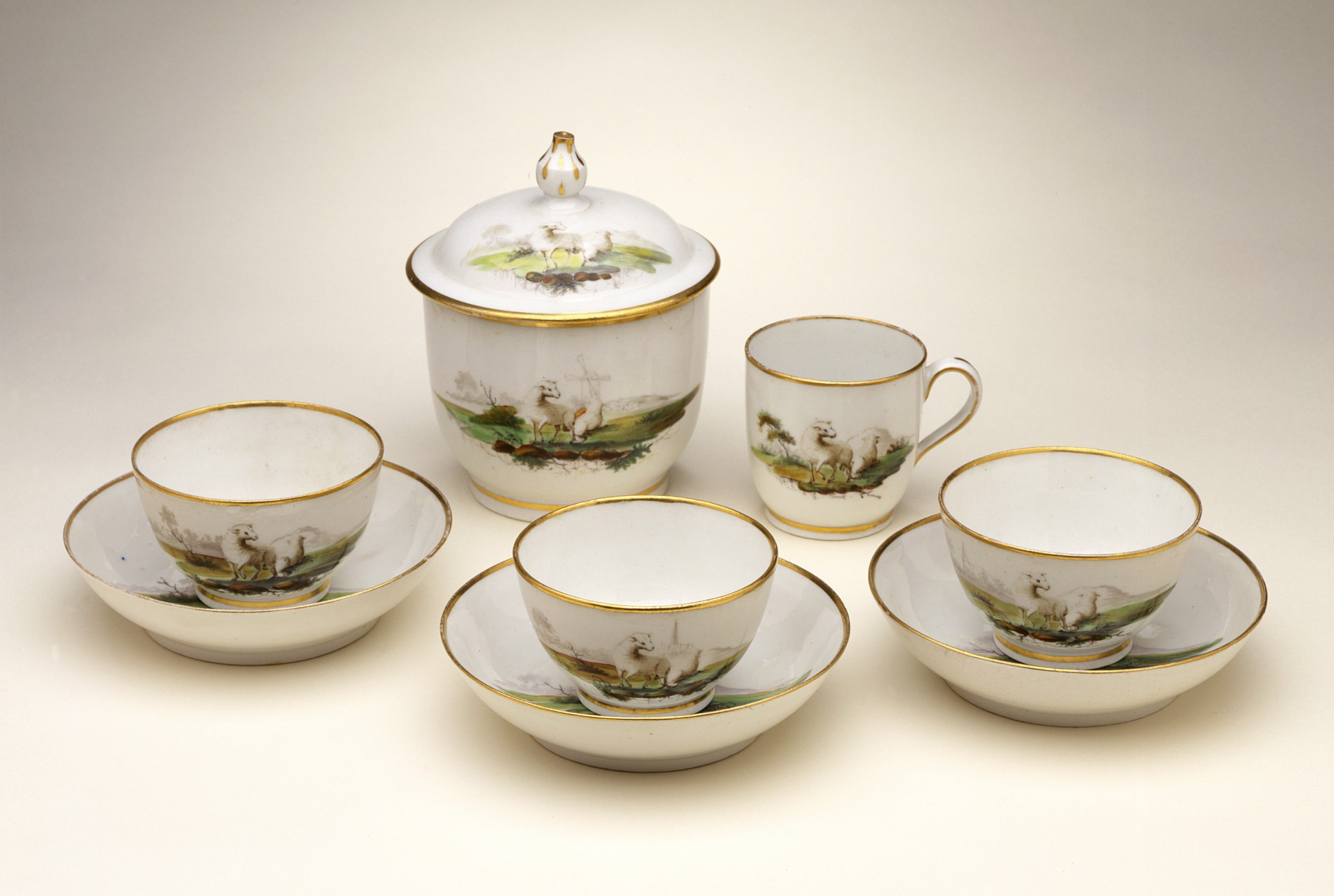
Teaset by William Billingsley, 1796

Pinxton Porcelain was a porcelain works created by John Coke and William Billingsley in Pinxton in Derbyshire, England.

== History ==
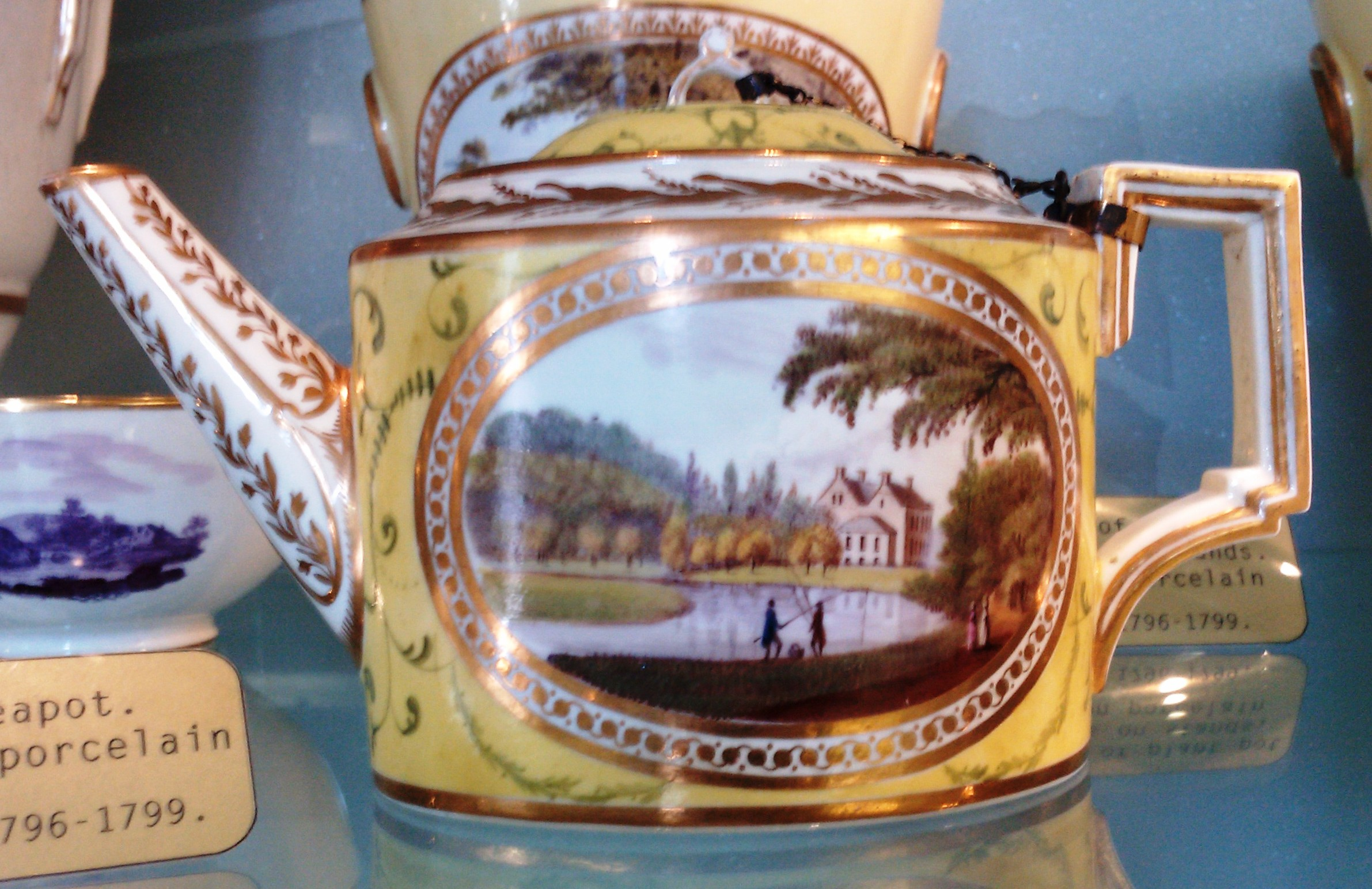
A Pinxton Porcelain teapot showing Brookhill Hall

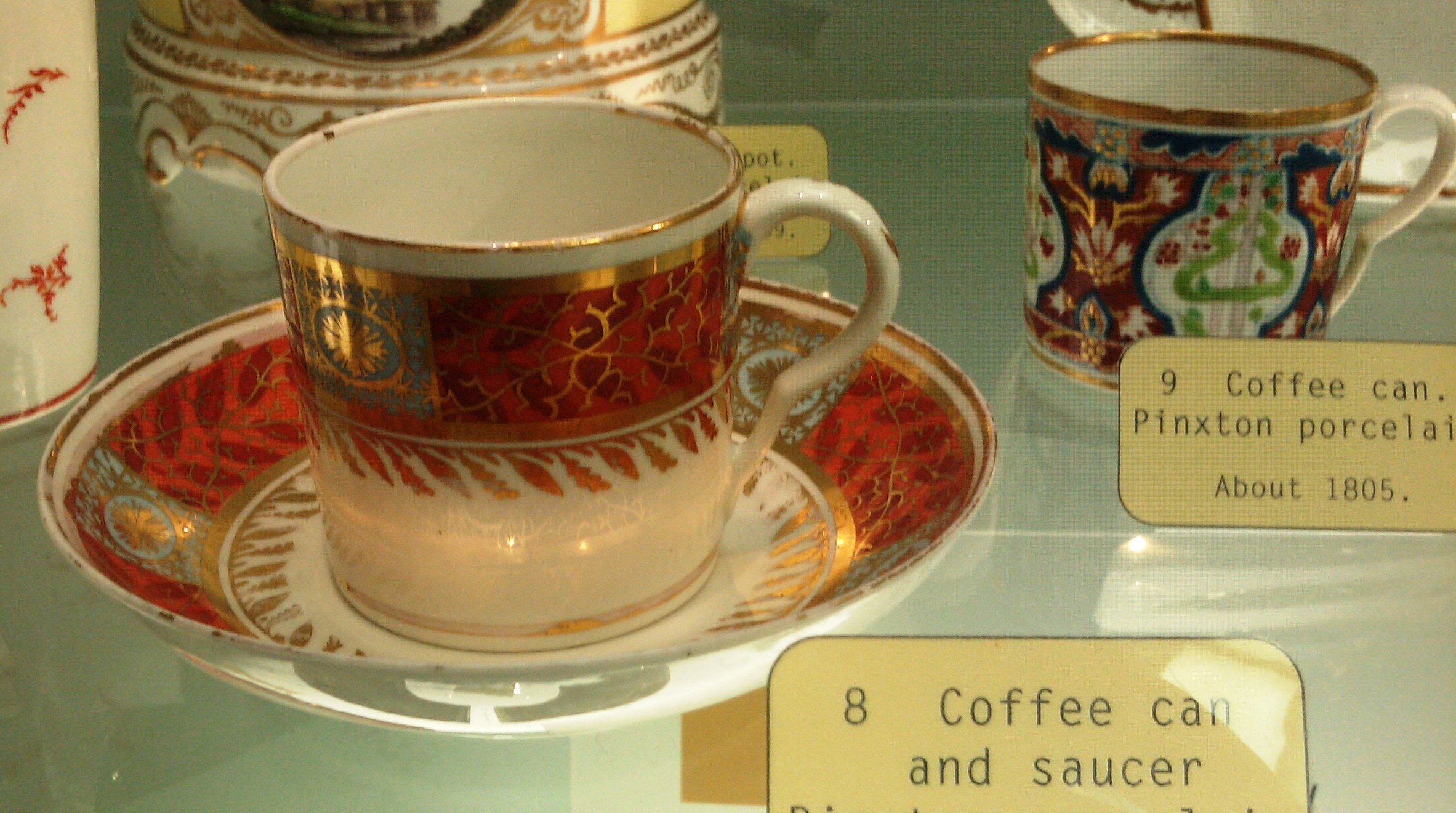
Coffee cups (cans) made from Pinxton porcelain

Pinxton Porcelain was founded on land at the head of the Cromford Canal, rented from the Reverend D'Ewes Coke's third son who went into business with the businessman and porcelain painter William Billingsley. Billingsley who had been trained at the Derby works is now renowned for the quality of his porcelain painting particularly his flower painting but he was also interested in perfecting a porcelain recipe which it is thought he obtained from Zachariah Boreman. Billingsley eventually left Pinxton and briefly set up a decorating shop in Mansfield where he decorated imported porcelain and pottery including some Pinxton porcelain. John Coke continued the business from 1799 to 1806, even taking in Henry Banks as a partner from 1801 to 1802. After John Coke married in 1806, John Cutts carried on until finally closing the factory in 1813.

Coke married Susanna Wilmot in April 1806 and although the porcelain business continued under John Cutts who had been decorating manager until 1813, Coke's interest moved to his coal mining business in Pinxton and he moved his family home to Debdale Hall.

== Legacy ==
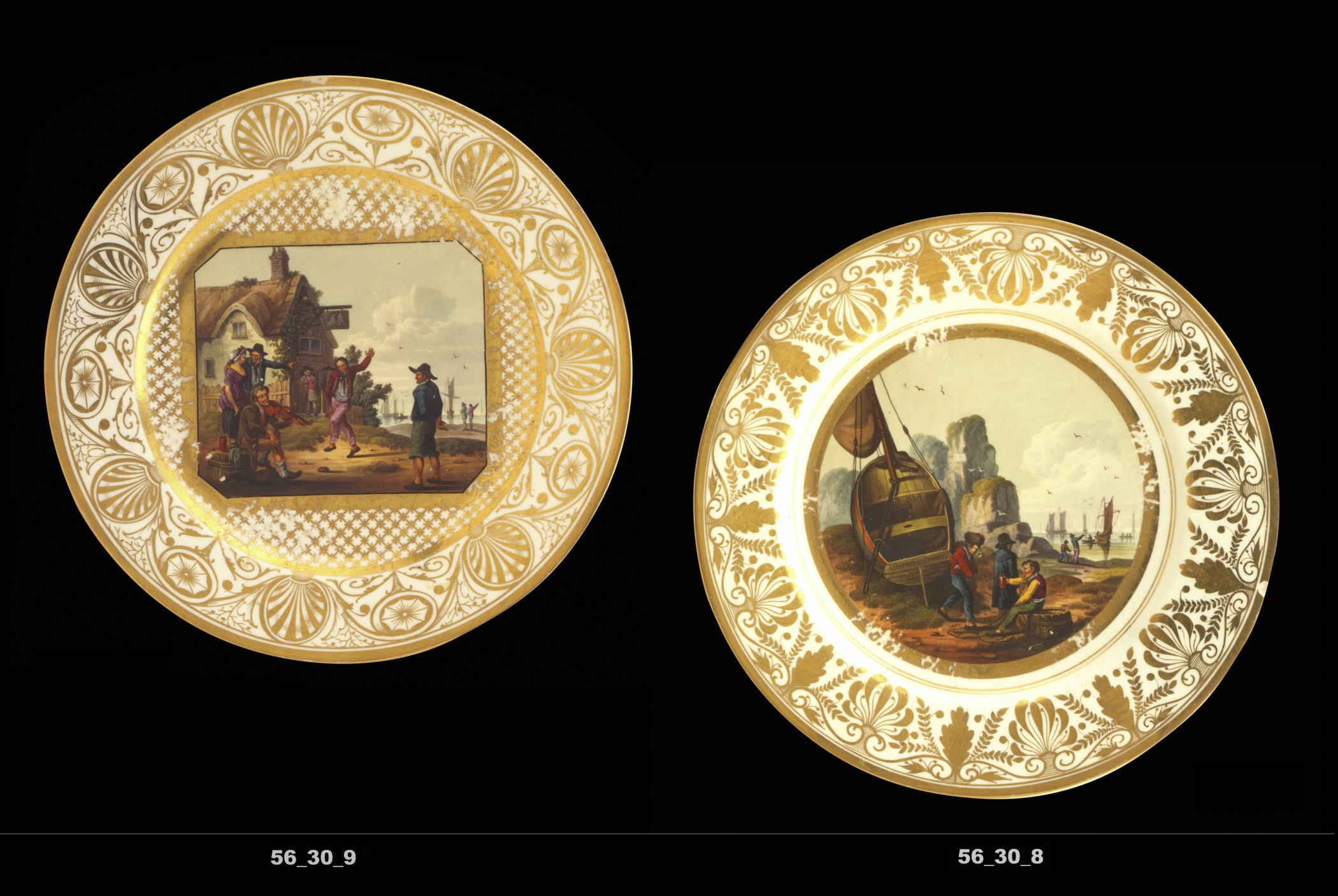
Two plates, c. 1816, painted by J. Hewlett (died 1836)

There is continued interest in Pinxton Porcelain and a group was formed in 1996 of people interested in this factory and its wares. The society has published a number of publications and organised exhibitions. The cabaret teapot illustrated was made at the Pinxton Porcelain factory and shows Brookhill Hall which was a home of John Coke. This cabaret teapot is part of the collection of Pinxton porcelain at Derby Museum, England. The standard reference books on the products of the Pinxton china factory are Pinxton Porcelain 1795–1813 and the Porcelain of Mansfield and Brampton-in-Torksey by C Barry Sheppard and The patterns and shapes of the Pinxton china factory 1796 to 1813 by N.D. Gent.
