= José F. Jiménez =

US Marine Corps Medal of Honor recipient (1946–1969)

José Francisco Jiménez
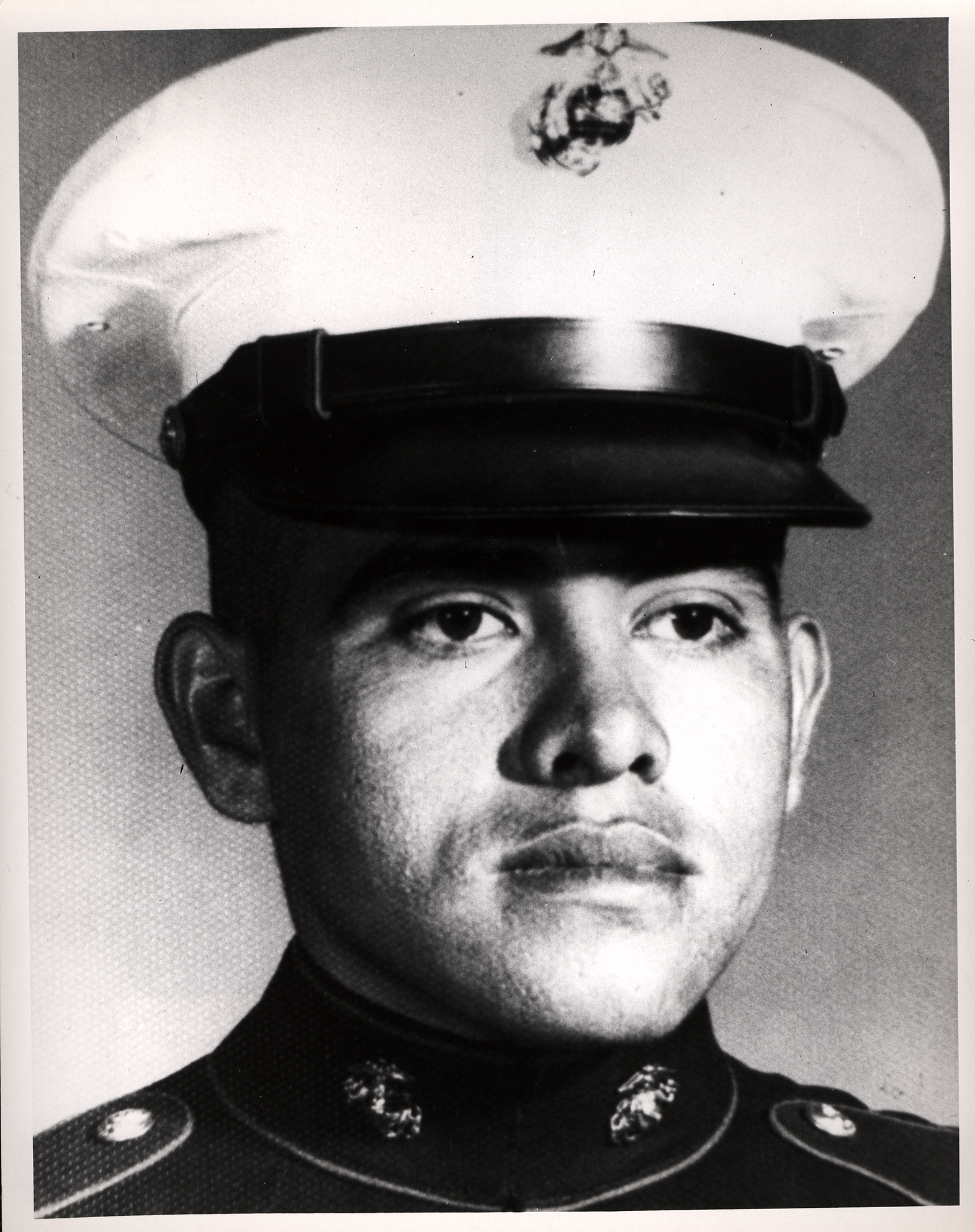
- Jose F. Jiménez, posthumous Medal of Honor recipient
- Born: March 20, 1946; Mexico City, Mexico
- Died: August 28, 1969 (aged 23) near Da Nang, Quảng Nam Province, South Vietnam
- Burial place: Morelia, Mexico; Glendale Memorial Park, Glendale, Arizona
- Military career
- Allegiance: United States of America
- Branch: United States Marine Corps
- Service years: 1968–1969
- Rank: Lance Corporal
- Nickname: Jo Jo
- Units: Company K, 3rd Battalion, 7th Marines, 1st Marine Division
- Conflicts: Vietnam War †
- Awards: Medal of Honor; Purple Heart

José Francisco "Jo Jo" Jiménez (March 20, 1946 – August 28, 1969) was a United States Marine Corps Lance Corporal who posthumously received the Medal of Honor for heroism in the Vietnam War in August 1969.

== Early years ==
José Jiménez was born on March 20, 1946, in Mexico City, Mexico. He attended Benito Juárez School and José María Morelos School in Morelia, Michoacán. He graduated from Red Rock Elementary School, Red Rock, Arizona, in June 1964, and from Santa Cruz Valley Union High School, Eloy, Arizona, in June 1968.

Enlisting in the Marine Corps Reserve at Phoenix, Arizona on June 7, 1968, Jiménez was discharged to enlist in the regular Marine Corps, August 12, 1968. He completed recruit training with the 1st Recruit Training Battalion at Marine Corps Recruit Depot San Diego, California, in October 1968. He was promoted to private first class on October 1, 1968. Transferred to the Marine Corps Base Camp Pendleton, California, he underwent individual combat training with Company G, 1st Battalion, 2nd Infantry Training Regiment and with the Rifle Training Company of the 2nd Infantry Training Regiment, completing the latter in December 1968.

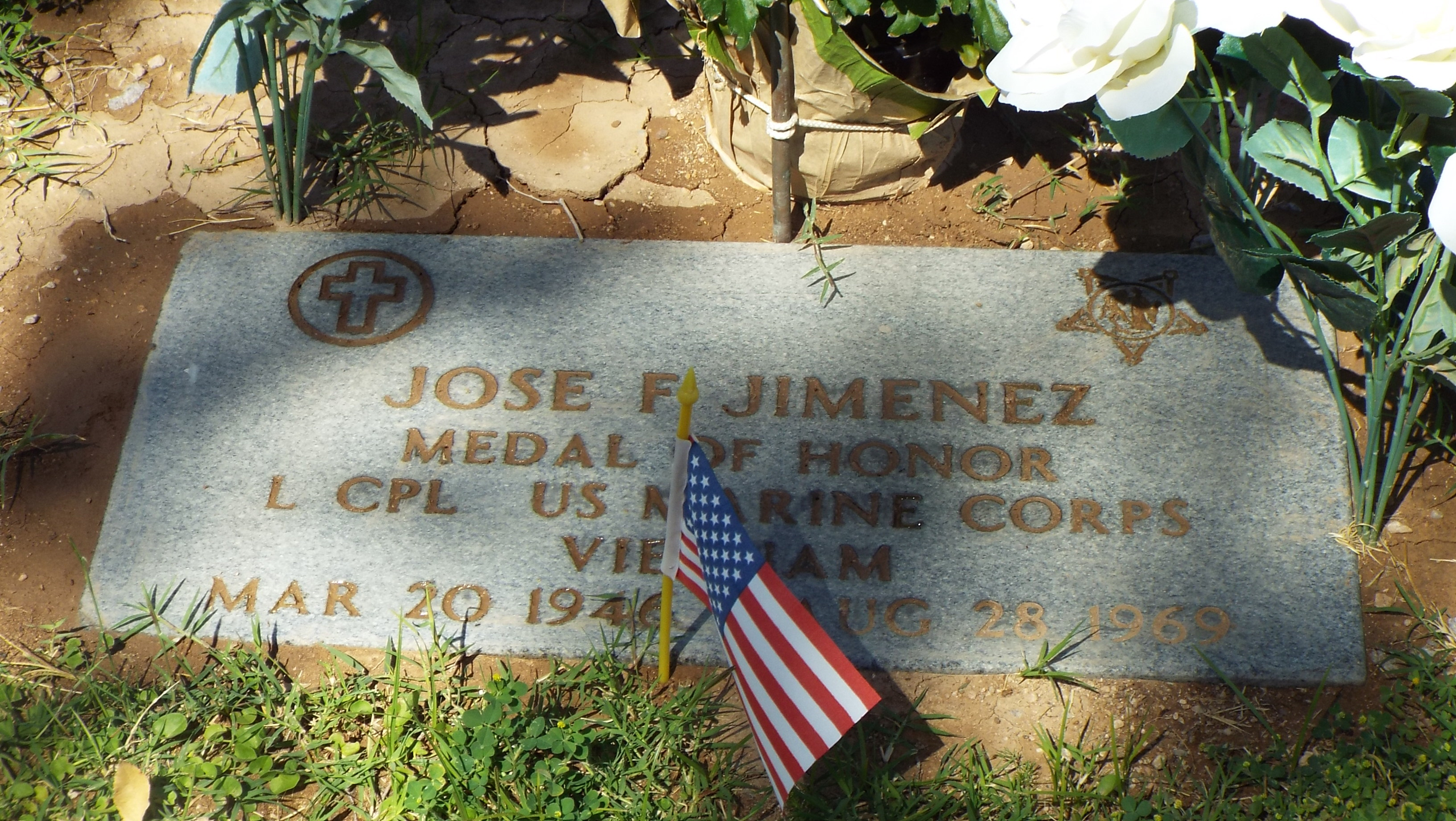
Grave of L/Cpl Jimenez

Ordered to the Republic of Vietnam in February 1969, Jiménez was assigned duty as a guide and fire team leader with Company K, 3rd Battalion, 7th Marines, 1st Marine Division. He was promoted to lance corporal on June 16, 1969. While participating in action against the enemy south of Da Nang, Quảng Nam Province, on August 28, 1969, he was killed in action.

Jimenez's mother, Basillia Jimenez, was employed by the Mexican government, working in Arizona. On September 6, 1969, she had Jimenez's remains buried in Morelia, Michoacan, Mexico. His mother died and was buried in Glendale Memorial Park Cemetery. With donations from various organizations his sister, who is his next of kin, was able to recover his remains and have them sent to Arizona. On January 17, 2017, LCpl Jimenez was re-interred and buried next to his mother, in Glendale Memorial Park Cemetery in Glendale, Arizona

== Medal of Honor ==
Medal of Honor citation:

The President of the United States in the name of The Congress takes pride in presenting the MEDAL OF HONOR posthumously to

LANCE CORPORAL JOSE F. JIMÉNEZ
UNITED STATES MARINE CORPS

for service as set forth in the following CITATION:

For conspicuous gallantry and intrepidity at the risk of his life above and beyond the call of duty while serving as a Fire Team Leader with Company K, Third Battalion, Seventh Marines, First Marine Division in operations against the enemy in the Republic of Vietnam on 28 August 1969. On that date Lance Corporal Jimenez' unit came under heavy attack by North Vietnamese Army soldiers concealed in well-camouflaged emplacements. Lance Corporal Jimenez reacted by seizing the initiative and plunging forward toward the enemy positions. He himself destroyed several enemy personnel and silenced an antiaircraft weapon. Shouting encouragement to his companions, Lance Corporal Jimenez continued his aggressive forward movement. He slowly maneuvered to within ten feet of hostile soldiers who were firing automatic weapons from a trench and, in the face of vicious enemy fire, destroyed the position. Although he was by now the target of concentrated fire from hostile gunners intent upon halting his assault, Lance Corporal Jimenez continued to press forward. As he moved to attack another enemy soldier, he was mortally wounded. Lance Corporal Jimenez' indomitable courage, aggressive fighting spirit and unfaltering devotion to duty upheld the highest traditions of the Marine Corps and of the United States Naval Service. He gallantly gave his life for his country.

/S/ RICHARD M. NIXON

== Awards and honors ==
Jiménez's medals include:

Medal of Honor
Purple Heart	Combat Action Ribbon	National Defense Service Medal
Vietnam Service Medal w/ 2 service stars	Vietnam Gallantry Cross w/ palm	Vietnam Campaign Medal
Expert marksmanship badge for rifle		Expert marksmanship badge for pistol

- Jiménez's name is inscribed on the Vietnam Veterans Memorial on Panel 18W Line 002.
- The Marine Barracks in Rota, Spain is named "Jiménez Hall" in honor of Jiménez.

== See also ==
- List of Medal of Honor recipients
- List of Medal of Honor recipients for the Vietnam War
- List of Hispanic Medal of Honor recipients
- Hispanics in the United States Marine Corps
