= Listed buildings in Pinxton =

Pinxton is a civil parish in the Bolsover District of Derbyshire, England. The parish contains four listed buildings that are recorded in the National Heritage List for England. All these listed buildings are designated at Grade II, the lowest of the three grades, which is applied to "buildings of national importance and special interest". The parish contains the village of Pinxton and the surrounding area, and the listed buildings consist of a church and a war memorial in the churchyard, as well as a country house and its stable block.

== Buildings ==
| Name and location | Photograph | Date | Notes |
|---|---|---|---|
| St Helen's Church; 53.09051°N 1.32435°W | | 13th century | The church has been much altered and extended through the centuries, and was restored in 1896. In 1939 the north aisle and west porch were added. The church is built in sandstone, and has roofs of red tile and lead. It consists of a nave, a north aisle, a chancel with a north vestry and a south organ bay and chapel, and a two-stage tower to the south. The tower has stepped diagonal buttresses, a two-light Decorated window with a hood mould on the east side and a slit window on the south side. The bell openings have a single light with a pointed head, and at the top is a flush parapet with moulded copings. |
| Brookhill Hall; 53.09979°N 1.31007°W | — | Early 17th century | A country house that has been altered and extended, it is in stone and red brick with stone dressings, and has a roof of stone slate and slate with moulded gable copings and moulded kneelers. The house is partly in two storeys with attics and basements, and partly in three storeys, and it has an irregular plan. The doorway has a porch and a four-centred arch with a dated coat of arms above. The earlier windows are mullioned or mullioned and transomed, and the later windows are sashes. |
| Stable block, Brookhill Hall; 53.10027°N 1.30993°W | — | 1770s | The stable block, which has been converted into housing, is in red brick, with dressings in brick and stone, a dentilled eaves band, and a hipped roof of Westmorland slate. There is a U-shaped plan, with a central three-storey clock tower, flanked by two-storey three-bay wings, and return wings. The central bay projects and contains a doorway in a semicircular recess that has a fanlight with Gothic tracery, flanked by recesses containing casement windows with similar tracery. |
| War memorial 53.09042°N 1.32364°W | | c. 1920 | The war memorial in the churchyard of St Helen's Church is in granite, and consists of a foliated and chamfered Latin cross. The cross has a tapering octagonal shaft carved with bands of leaves and traceried Gothic niches, and at the top is a square inscribed capital. The shaft is on an octagonal plinth on three octagonal steps; on the plinth are plaques with inscriptions and the names of those lost in the First World War. The memorial is in an octagonal enclosure with three walls and plaques with inscription relating to the Second World War and later conflicts. |
