= D'Ewes Coke =

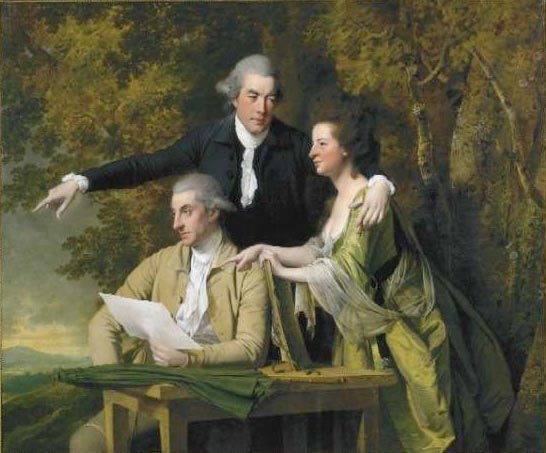
- D'Ewes Coke and his wife, Hannah, behind his cousin Daniel Coke in a painting by Joseph Wright (use mouse pointer to explore the image)
- Born: 1747; Mansfield Woodhouse, England
- Died: 12 April 1811; Bath, England
- Education: Repton School and St John's College, Cambridge
- Occupations: Clergyman and barrister
- Spouse: Hannah Heywood
- Children: three sons, D'Ewes, William and John
- Parent(s): George Coke and Elizabeth, dau. of Rev. Seth Ellis

D'Ewes Coke (1747 – 12 April 1811) was rector of Pinxton and South Normanton in Derbyshire, a colliery owner and philanthropist.

He married Hannah, heiress of George Heywood of Brimington.

== Background ==
Coke was born at Mansfield Woodhouse in 1747, the only son of George Coke (1725–1759) of Kirkby Hall, Nottinghamshire, and of his wife Elizabeth, daughter of the Reverend Seth Ellis. George Coke was himself the son of another D'Ewes Coke (died 1751), of Suckley, and of his first wife, Frances Coke, daughter and co-heiress of William Coke of Trusley, and was the only one of their three children to survive childhood. Coke's father died in 1759, when his son was only about twelve.

The name D'Ewes came from Coke's great-grandmother Elizabeth d'Ewes, who was the mother of the first D'Ewes Coke. A daughter of Sir Willoughby d'Ewes, 2nd Baronet, of Stowlangtoft Hall, Suffolk, she was the wife of Coke's great-grandfather Heigham Coke of Suckley. Her grandfather was Sir Simonds d'Ewes, 1st Baronet.

Coke's own family can be traced back to the 15th century and includes such notable figures as George Coke, a Bishop of Hereford just before the English Civil War, and Sir John Coke, Secretary of State to King Charles I.

Coke's family owned collieries in Pinxton, where Coke later paid for a school and a schoolmaster's residence to be erected.

Coke was a cousin of Daniel Coke (1745–1825), a barrister and member of parliament.

== Life and family ==
Coke was educated at Repton School and St John's College, Cambridge, where he was admitted a pensioner on 13 October 1764, his father being named as George Coke, Colonel of the 3rd Dragoons, of Kirkby Hall, Nottinghamshire.

Entering the ministry of the Church of England in 1770, Coke was ordained a deacon on 23 September of that year and priest on 15 December 1771, both in the Diocese of Coventry and Lichfield, and held the rectories of Pinxton and South Normanton, Derbyshire, from 1771 to 1811.

He married Hannah, [died 1818] daughter of George Heywood of Brimington Hall, Nottinghamshire, where Coke spent his later years. They had three sons, the eldest being another D'Ewes Coke (1774–1856), who was Coke's heir and became a barrister. The second son also went into the law and became Sir William Coke (1776–1818), a judge in Ceylon. Coke's third son was John Coke DL (died 1841), who served as High Sheriff of Nottinghamshire in 1830. John Coke was also instrumental in founding the Pinxton China factory, on land rented from his father. All three sons played a role in the establishment of the Mansfield and Pinxton Railway, which opened in 1819.

The family portrait on this page by Joseph Wright of Derby was painted about 1782, just after Coke and his wife had inherited Brookhill Hall, near Pinxton. It shows them with Coke's cousin Daniel Coke at a table in the open air, under a large tree. The focus of the composition, and apparently the object of discussion, is a sheet of paper held by Daniel Coke, which may relate to the unseen landscape. Wright places D'Ewes Coke at the apex of a triangle, with his gaze towards his wife, while the other two look away from the small group. The meaning of the painting has been lost. Coke became a member of Derby Philosophical Society which was formed when Erasmus Darwin moved to Derby.

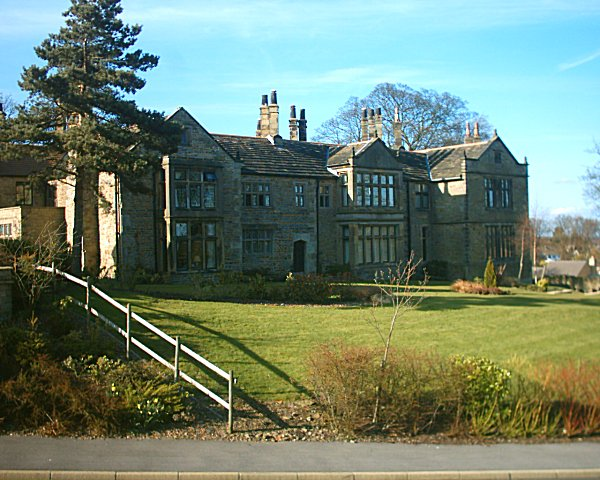
Totley Hall, inherited by Hannah Coke in 1791 from her uncle Andrew Gillimore

Coke died at Bath on 12 April 1811 and was buried at Pinxton.

== Legacy ==
In his Will, Coke established an educational charity at Pinxton, leaving five pounds a year from the profits of his collieries to buy books for poor children. In 1846, the books were generally given to children attending an unendowed school.
