= Pinxton =

Village in Derbyshire, England

Coordinates: 53.091°N 1.320°W

- Village and civil parish
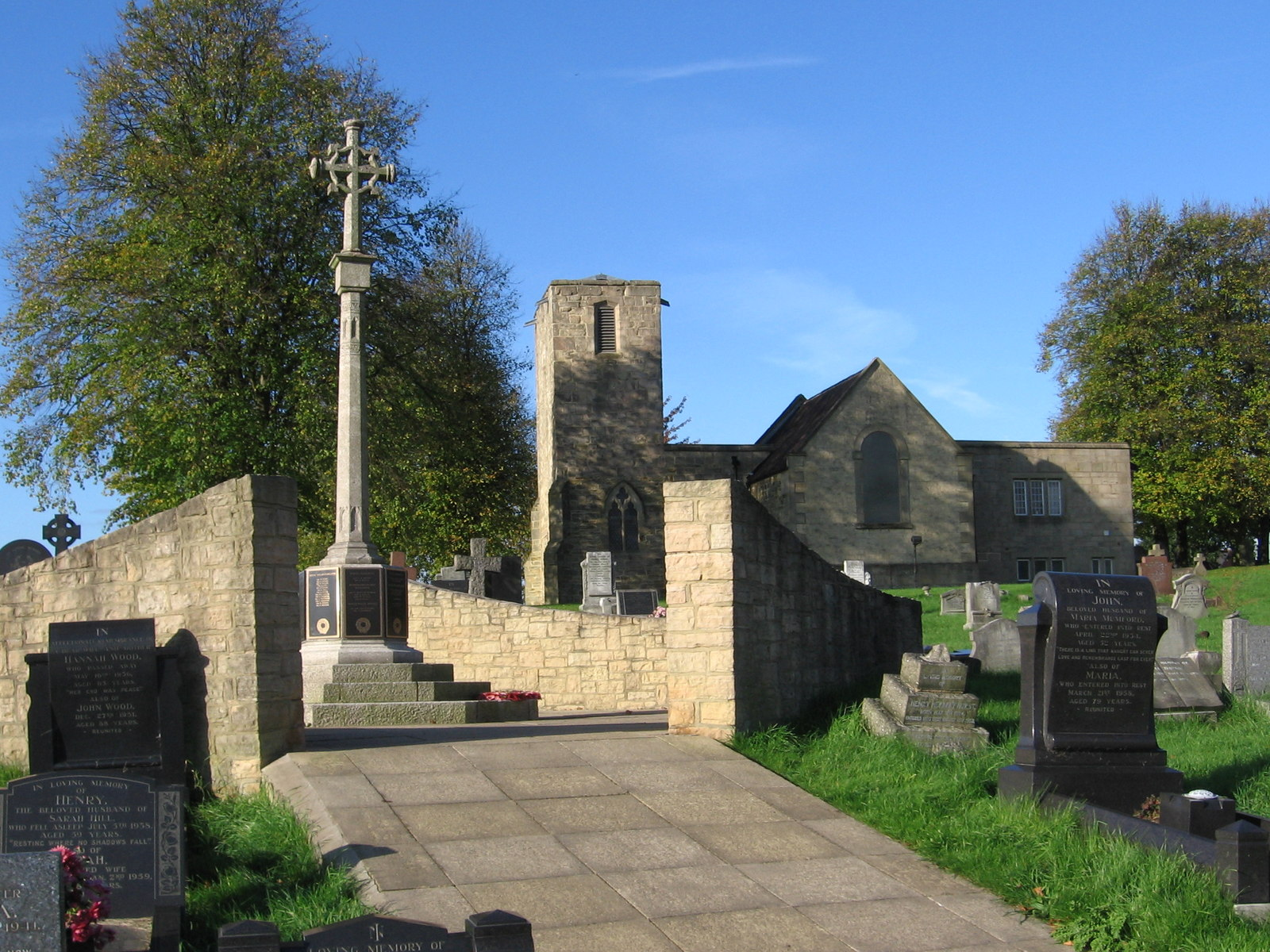
- St Helens Church

- Location within Derbyshire
- Population: 5,652 (2021)
- OS grid reference: SK467592
- Civil parish: Pinxton
- District: Bolsover
- Shire county: Derbyshire
- Region: East Midlands
- Country: England
- Sovereign state: United Kingdom
- Post town: Nottingham
- Postcode district: NG16
- Dialling code: 01773
- Police: Derbyshire
- Fire: Derbyshire
- Ambulance: East Midlands
- UK Parliament: Bolsover
- Website: https://www.pinxtonparishcouncil.gov.uk/

Pinxton is a village and civil parish in Derbyshire on the western boundary of Nottinghamshire, England, just south of the Pinxton Interchange at Junction 28 of the M1 motorway where the A38 road meets the M1. Pinxton is part of the Bolsover District and at the 2021 Census had a population of 5,652.

== History ==
=== Etymology ===
In Anglo-Saxon times, Pinxton was a small agricultural community, thought to have been recorded in the Domesday Book of 1086 as "Esnotrewic." It is also thought that it was known as "Snodeswic," given by Wulfric Spott to Burton Abbey.

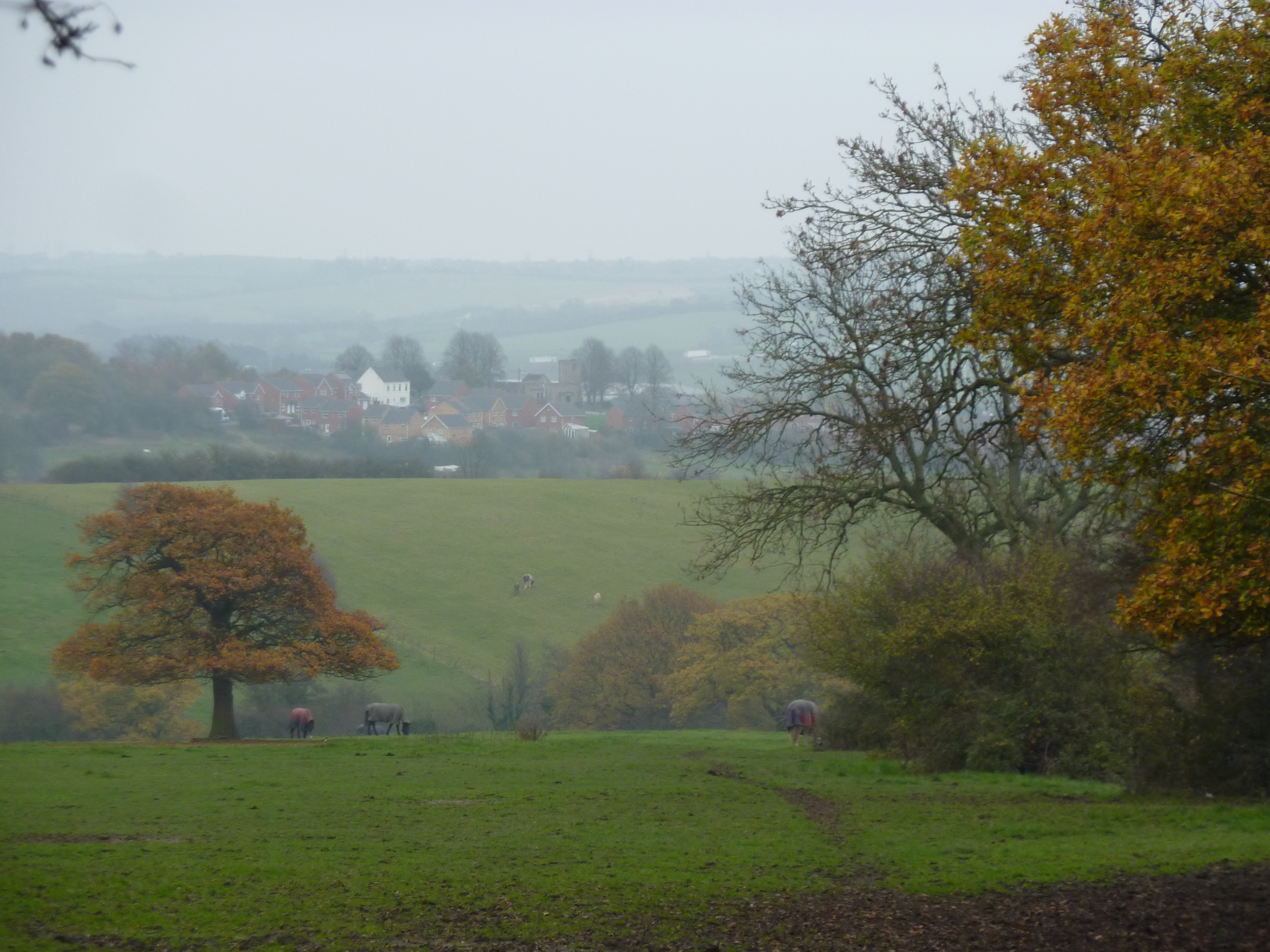
Pinxton fields.

In Norman times, it was under the control of William Peveril, for whom it was held by Drogo fitz Pons. It is thought that he renamed the manor "Ponceston" and it gradually changed to Penekeston and then to Pinxton.

=== Coal ===
Since 1800 BC, coal had been extracted in the area. In 1794 the Cromford Canal encouraged this trade. By the beginning of the next century there were a number of deep coal mines. Trade increased with the growth of the Industrial Revolution. There were also four lime kilns and a china works producing quality ware. Pinxton's prosperity increased further as the terminus of the Mansfield and Pinxton Railway, opened in 1819.

From the profits of his colliery at Pinxton, D'Ewes Coke (1747-1811) of Brookhill Hall, a clergyman colliery master, founded a local school and an educational charity. The collieries and coking ovens have been replaced by an industrial estate, and the old colliery village has all but disappeared.

=== John King ===
John King is the inventor of a mining safety device, a detaching hook, which successfully completed trials in 1873 at Pinxton No.1 colliery. The detaching hook prevents a cage raising miners from a shaft from being raised up and over the headstock pulley when raised from a mine shaft. A mining museum in Pinxton honoring John King and commemorating the invention of the detaching hook was closed in 2014 and its contents distributed to other museums and heritage centres. In Pinxton today, there remains the John King mining wheel which was used in the days when mining was available. Now the John King wheel is a historical model for the public to see. John King is also named after an infant school in Pinxton. The horse gin, or whim from Pinxton Green Colliery has been re-erected at Nottingham Industrial Museum. Pinxton signal box, which once controlled access to Bentinck Colliery has been relocated to Barrow Hill Engine Shed.

=== World War II ===
On 12 August 1940, a stick of bombs was dropped on Pinxton. One council house was hit, killing one person.

== St. Helen's Church ==
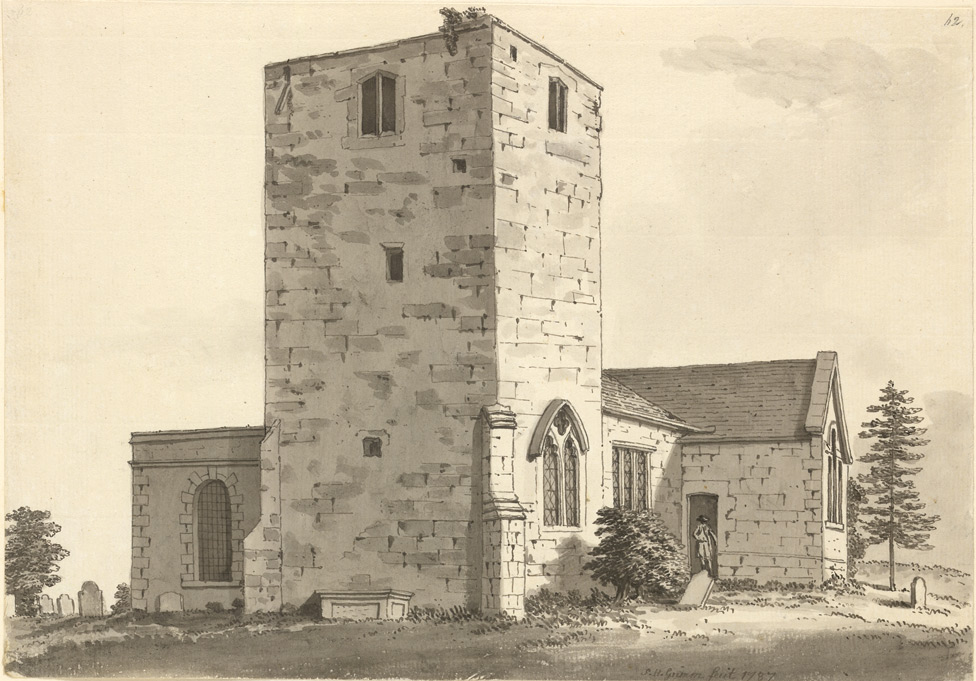
The church in 1733, as drawn by the Swiss artist Samuel Hieronymus Grimm.

The church of St Helen dates from medieval times, possibly having been built on the site of a previous small castle. Much of it was rebuilt in 1790 reusing the original materials, and only the west tower and west end of the old church remains. By 1890, it was so dilapidated that most of the services were held in the mission room. In the following century it was repaired, and a new porch and north aisle were added in 1939.

== Transport ==
The M1 reached junction 28 on Monday 3 July 1967, just after noon. It was to have opened at 10am, making the M1 136 miles.

The Pinxton to Barlborough section, to the north, was built by John Laing Construction Ltd, and opened on Wednesday 25 October 1967; it had cost £12.5m, and was two months late. Construction had started in August 1965, and there had been mining subsidence.

The A38 section from Alfreton to the M1 opened as the A615 on 27 August 1969. It was built by Robert McGregor & Sons, and was built as a concrete road. It was Derbyshire's largest road project, and took 29 acres of land in Pinxton. Construction started in October 1967, and opened four months early. It crossed the former A613 at Alfreton.

=== Trainspotting ===
"Pinxton Level Crossing" is a major tourist attraction for trainspotters who come from all over the country to take photographs of some of the unique locomotives that pass over the crossing.

== Education ==
There are four schools in Pinxton; John King Infant Academy situated on Church St W, Longwood Infant Academy on Wharf Rd, Kirkstead Junior Academy on Kirkstead Rd, and Pinxton Nursery School on Kirkstead Rd.

== Pinxton Wharf ==
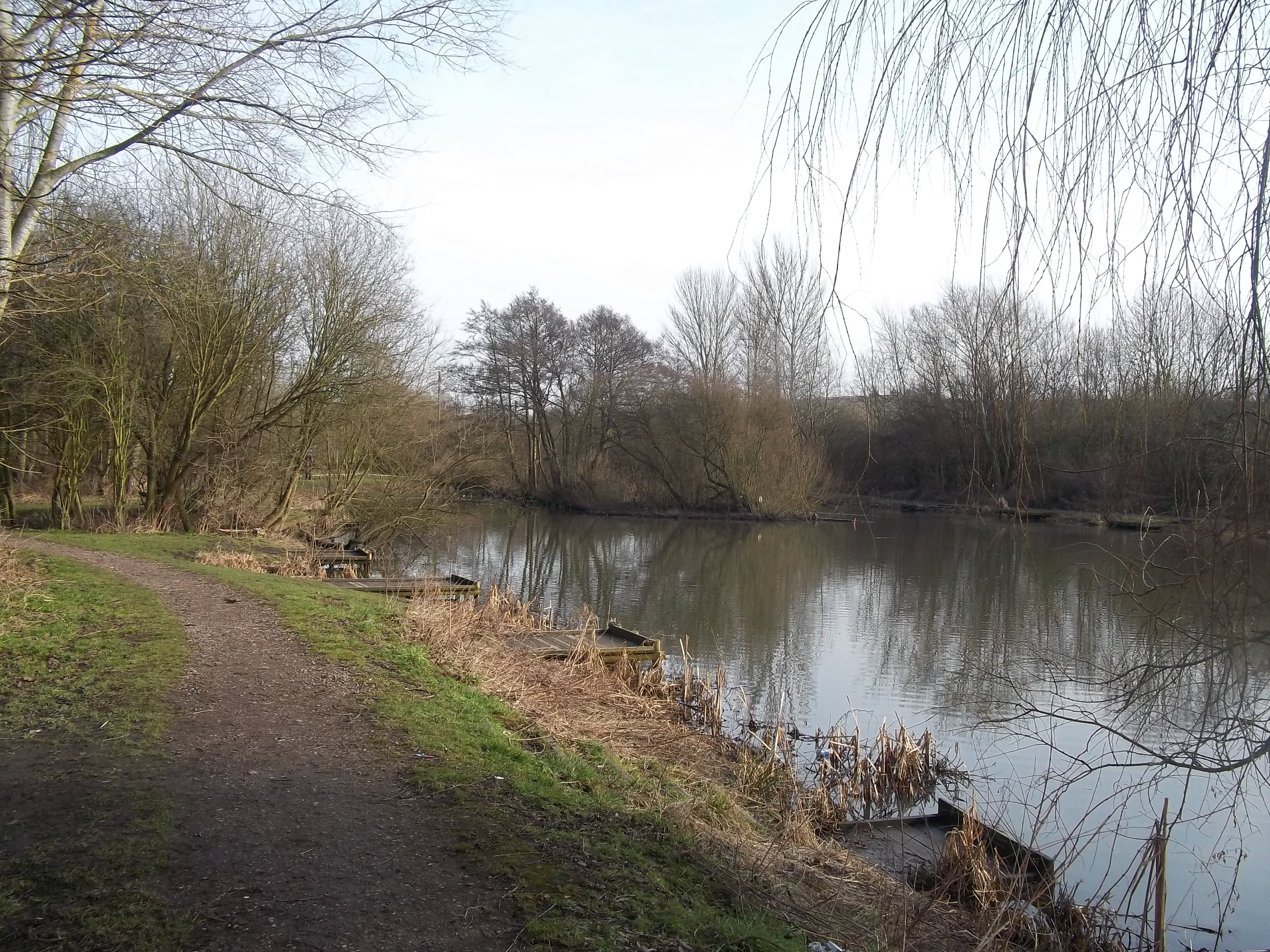
Pinxton Wharf pond.

Pinxton Wharf is a site that consists of a stretch of Pinxton Canal and a fishing pond located on the southern edge of Pinxton. Pinxton Canal was a branch of the Cromford Canal.

== Pinxton FC ==
Pinxton Football Club is a football club based at The Welfare Ground, Pinxton. They compete in the Central Midlands League South Division. The manager is Kenny Shinfield.

== Notable people ==
- John Edward Bernard Seely, 1st Baron Mottistone, British Army general, Secretary of State for War and MP from 1900–1904, 1904–1922 and 1923–1924. He led one of the last great cavalry charges in history at the Battle of Moreuil Wood on his war horse Warrior in March 1918.
- D'Ewes Coke (1747–1811), rector of Pinxton and South Normanton, a colliery owner and philanthropist.
- John Hancock (1857–1940), politician, Trade Unionist and MP for Mid Derbyshire, 1909–1918 & Belper, 1918–1923.
- Roger Sacheverell Coke (1912–1972), composer and pianist.

=== Sport ===
- Ralph Hoten (1896–1978), footballer, played 310 games including 197 for Northampton Town
- Cyril Stocks (1905–1989), footballer who played 241 games for Nottingham Forest.
- Ivan Hollett (1940–2022), footballer, played 362 games including 157 for Chesterfield
- Aden Flint (born 1989), footballer, he has played over 575 games including 209 for Bristol City. He has won the EFL Championship Player of the Month in Feb. 2016, and Sept. 2017.
- Steve Smith-Eccles (born 1955), National Hunt jockey who rode 861 winners during his career, including See You Then to victory in the Champion Hurdle in three consecutive years (1985, 1986 and 1987), for trainer Nicky Henderson.

== See also ==
- Listed buildings in Pinxton
- Pinxton Castle
