= Goodyear Farms Historic Cemetery =

Cemetery in Maricopa County, Arizona

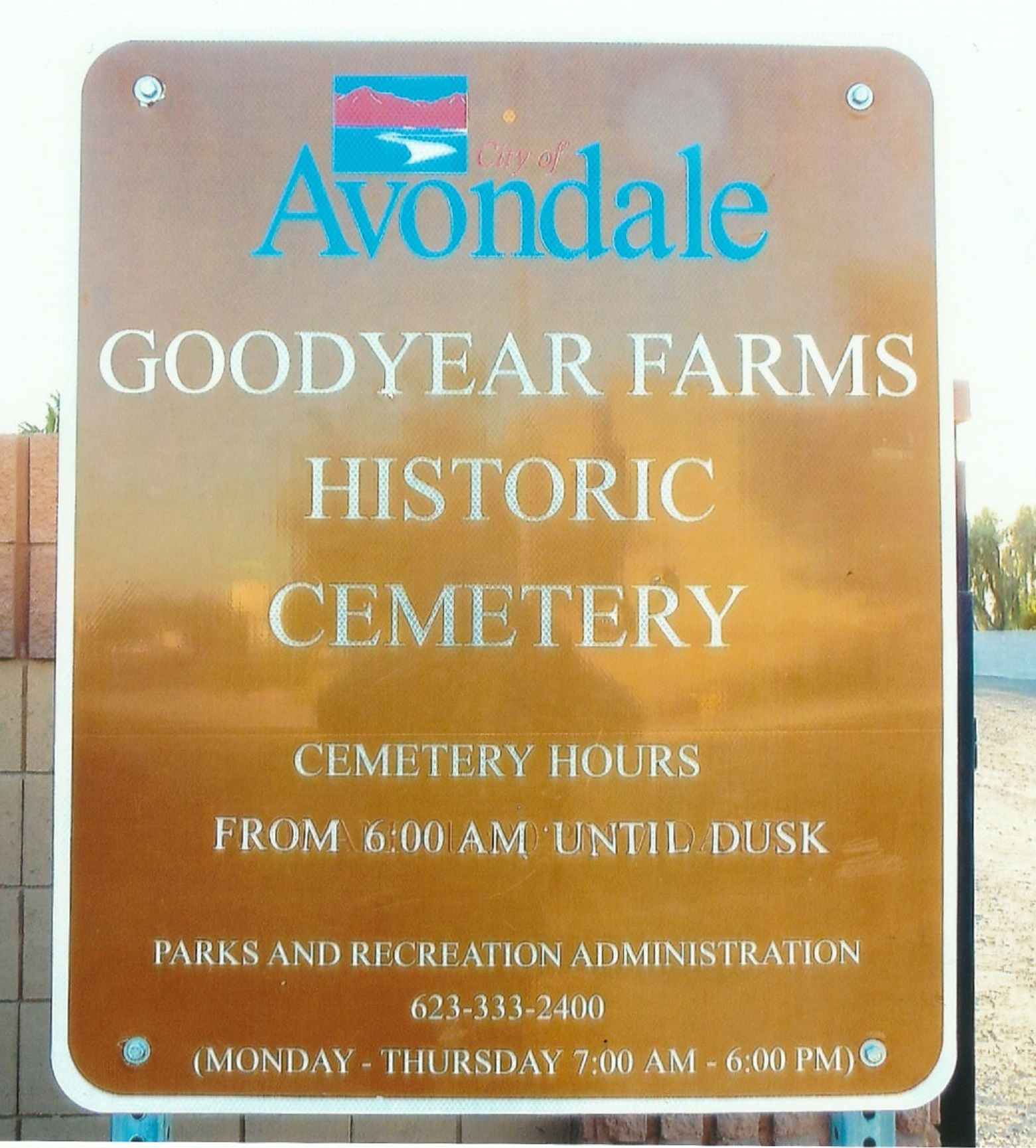

Details
- Established: 1917
- Location: 3900 N Santa Fe Trail
- Country: United States
- Coordinates: 33°29′24″N 112°19′58″W
- Owned by: City of Avondale, Arizona
- No. of graves: 372
- Find a Grave: Goodyear Farms Historic Cemetery

The Goodyear Farms Historic Cemetery is the official name given to a historic cemetery located at 3900 N Santa Fe Trail in the city of Avondale, Arizona. In the past the cemetery was known as the "Pioneer Cemetery" and also as the "Litchfield Cemetery". It is the final resting place of many Mexican migrants and Native-Americans who worked in the Goodyear Farms and the Wigwam Resort in Litchfield Park. The majority of the unmarked graves are of those who perished in the 1918 Spanish Influenza pandemic which spread throughout the entire globe. The Pioneers' Cemetery Association (PCA) defines an "historic cemetery" as one which has been in existence for more than fifty years.

== History ==
Paul Weeks Litchfield was an American industrialist, born in Boston, Massachusetts, who in 1900 became the superintendent of the Goodyear Tire & Rubber Company plant in Akron, Ohio. During World War I, the demand for cotton was in an all-time high in the United States. The United States Department of Agriculture suggested that cotton could be grown in the area surrounding Phoenix, Arizona. Litchfield went to Phoenix, but was unsuccessful. He did become interested in the Salt River Valley area and convinced the Goodyear to establish the Southwest Cotton Company in Phoenix. Litchfield was named president and he purchased 36,000 acres (15,000 ha) in the general Salt River Valley area which included 5,000 acres (2,000 ha) around the present site of Litchfield Park, then known as Litchfield Ranch.

Two thousand men and women, mostly Mexican migrants and Native Americans were recruited by the Southwest Cotton Company. They transformed the desert area into agricultural fields which they worked and cultivated thousands of acres of cotton fields.

== Cemetery ==
In 1917, Litchfield established the cemetery for the employees of the Goodyear Farms and the Wigwam Resort.The cemetery was first called the "Pioneer Cemetery" and later changed to "Litchfield Cemetery". In 1918, the labor camps in Arizona were not exempt from Spanish influenza pandemic. Many of the workers of the Litchfield Ranch were affected and died. It is believed that there are approximately 1700 graves in the cemetery. Most of the graves related to those who died from the epidemic are unmarked. Eventually, other workers and their families used this cemetery.

Former Avondale City Councilman Amado B. Sernas (1908–1994) is buried there. Sernas Plaza in Avondale is named after him. The mural was painted by Cuban artist Victor Caldee in honor of those who worked the fields. The cemetery dedication reads as follows:

This historical monument is dedicated to these early farming pioneers who traveled from afar in search for life's blessings "Litchfield" was founded was around 1916 and was originally established as a labor camp. This cemetery was founded by Paul W. Litchfield in 1917 for the private use of hundreds of legally imported aliens and other employees whose service was to cultivate raw desert into clean fields for planting cotton and other crops. A serious influenza epidemic claimed more lives than World War I. here in memory lie those and their families who dedicated their lives. This cemetery was once located in the heart of the labor camps and played a very important role in Arizona's history. The restoration of this historic property could not be completed without the help of the community and Goodyear Farms, directed by Mr. Jose M. Villela, Historian and Dr. Grace Burruel Farnam Consultant. Donated by Arizona Granite and Marble Company 1984.

== Cemetery vandalism ==
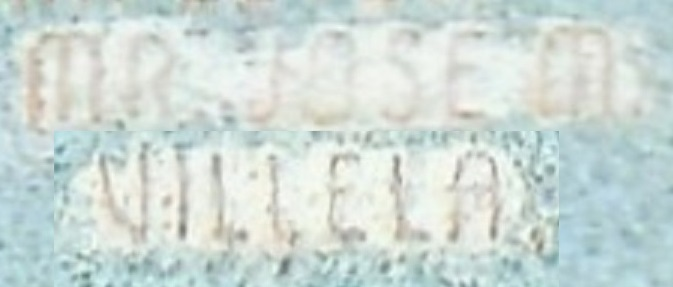

In 2017, the cemetery was subject to vandalism with racial and derogatory marks made on the tombs. When the community members found out they participated in a candlelight vigil set up by Avondale City Councilman Lorenzo Sierra. One example of the vandalism that has taken place is the attempt to scratch the name of Jose M. Villela from the historic monument dedication.

== Images ==
Goodyear Farms Historic Cemetery
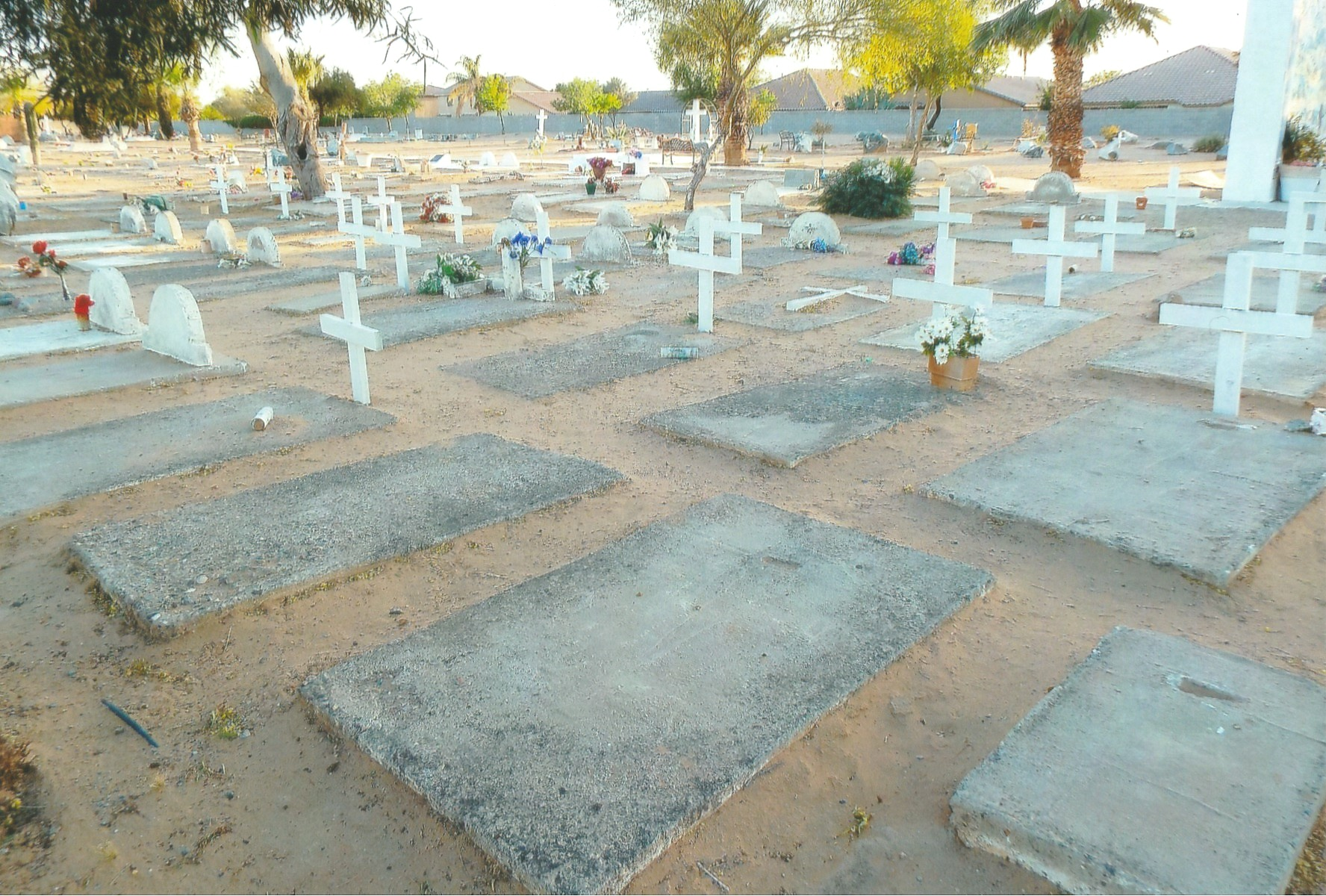
Unmarked graves

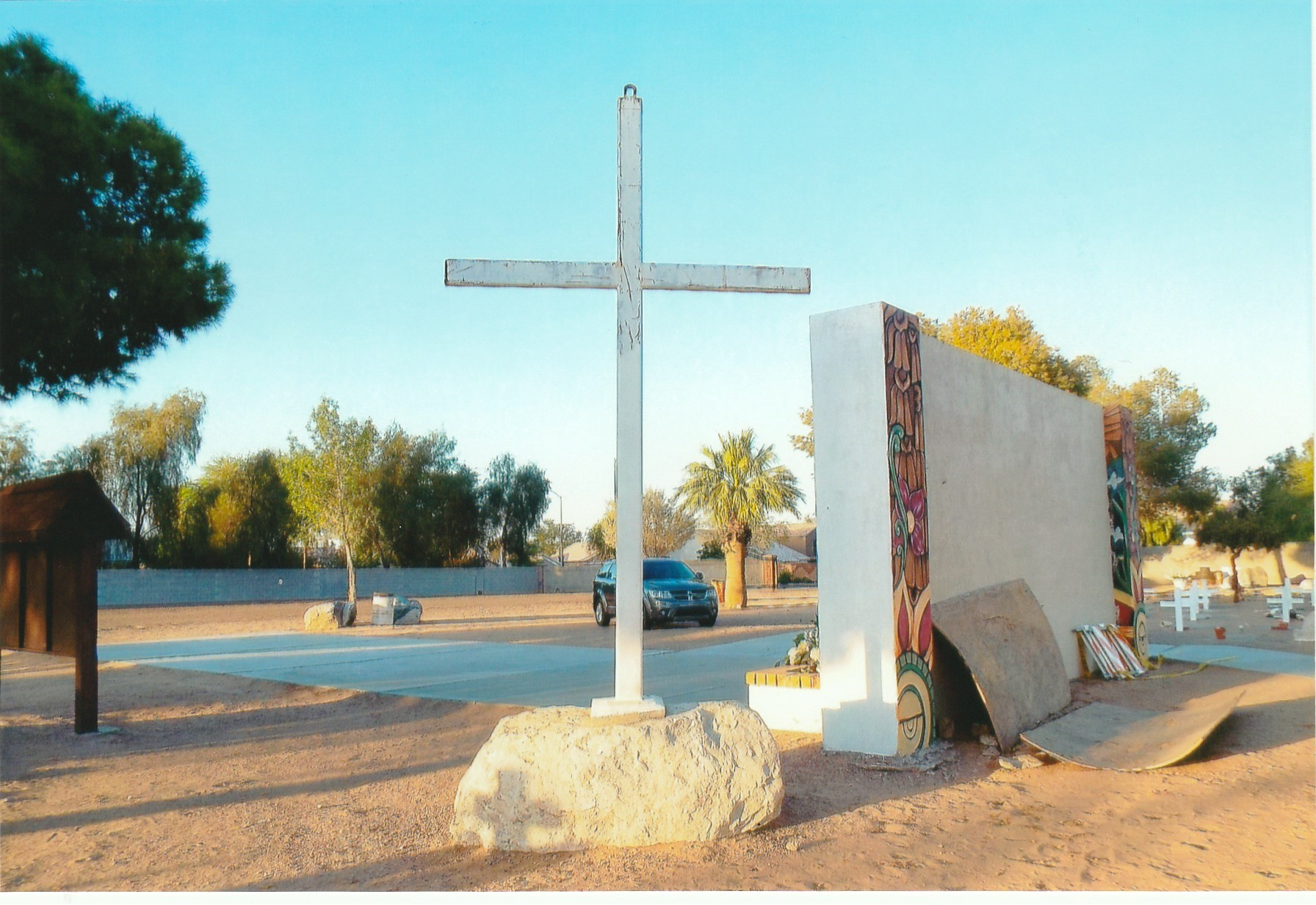
Goodyear Farms Historic Cemetery Cross

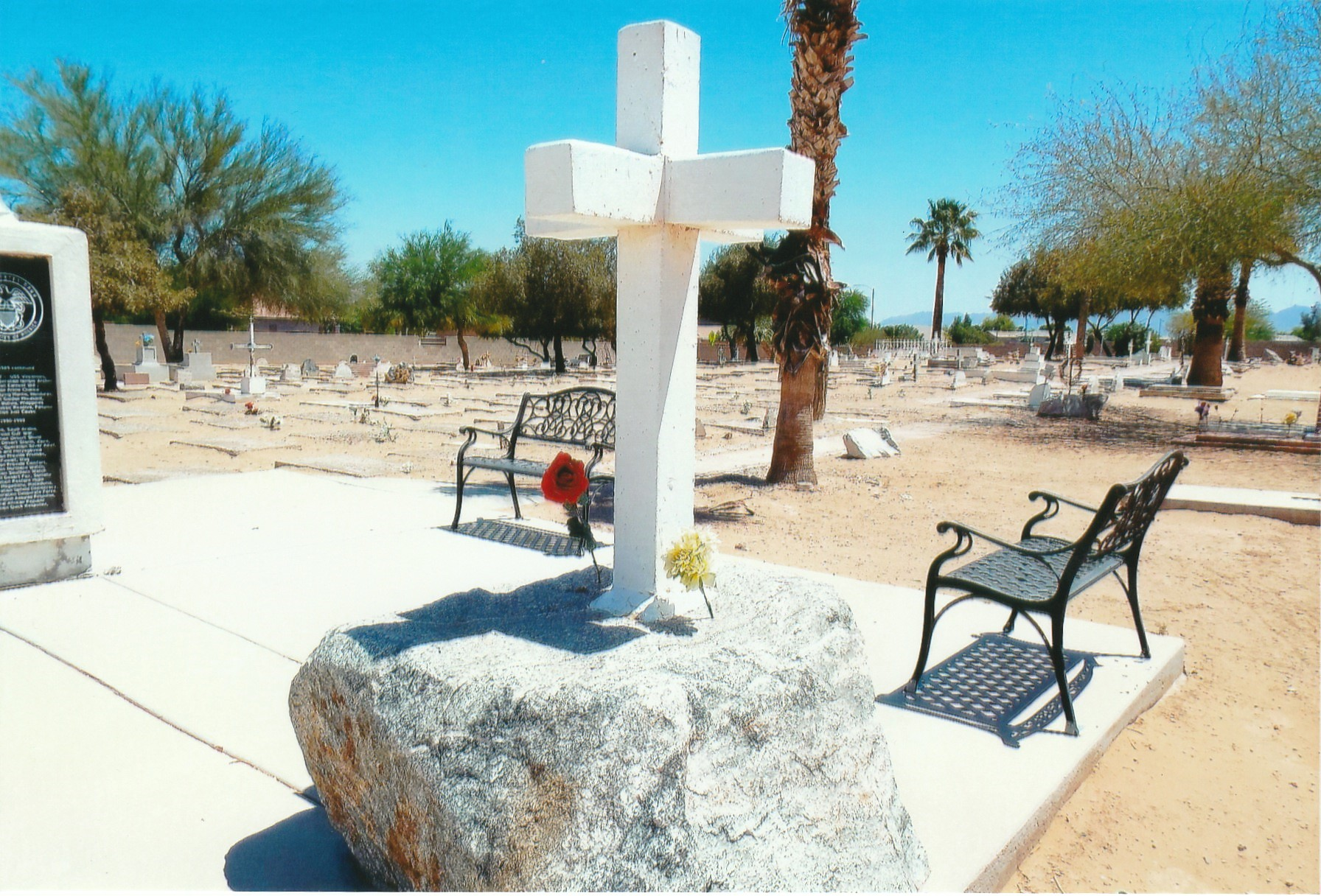
Cross

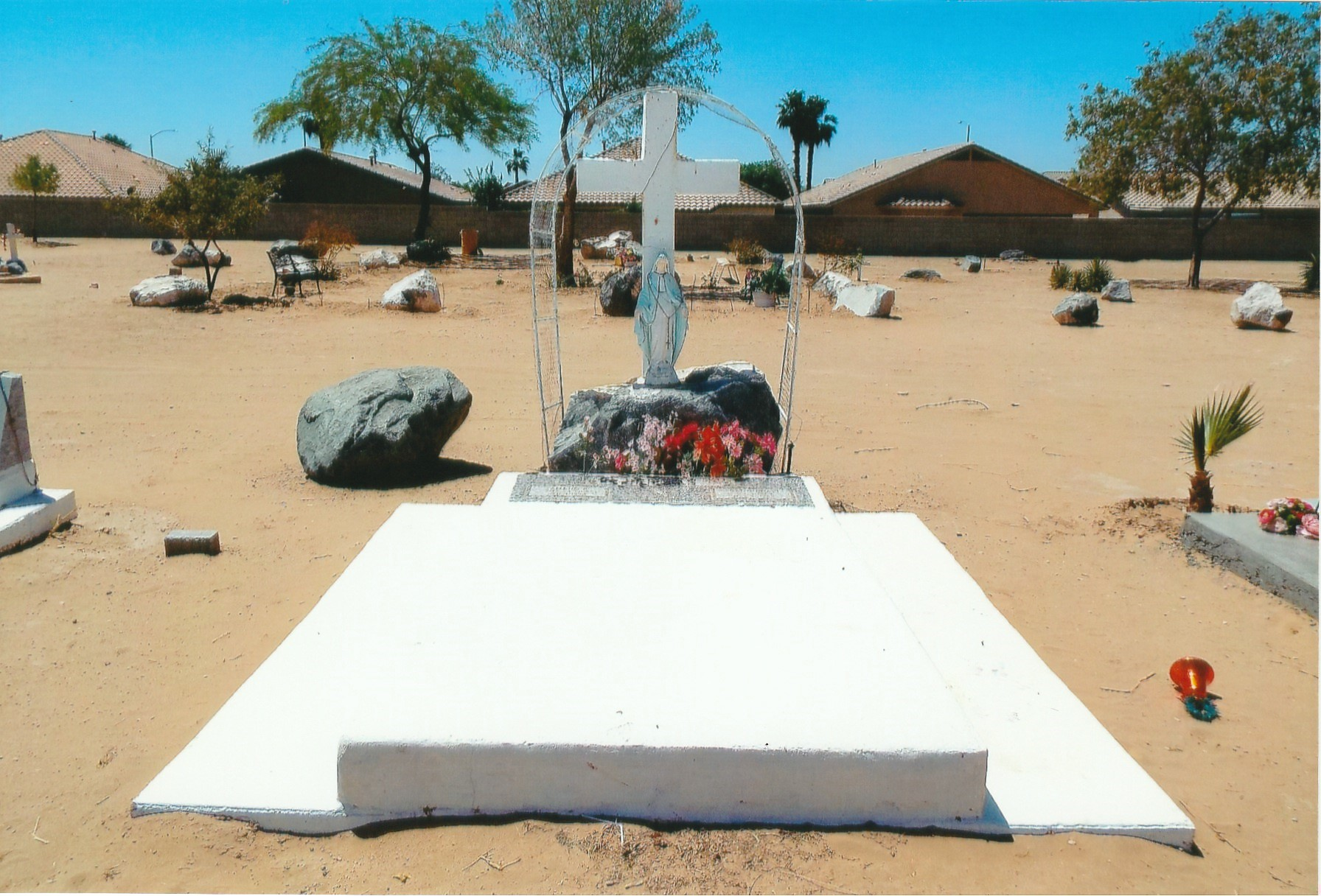
Graves of Amado B. Sernas (1908–1994) and his wife Francisca T. Sernas (1907–1988)

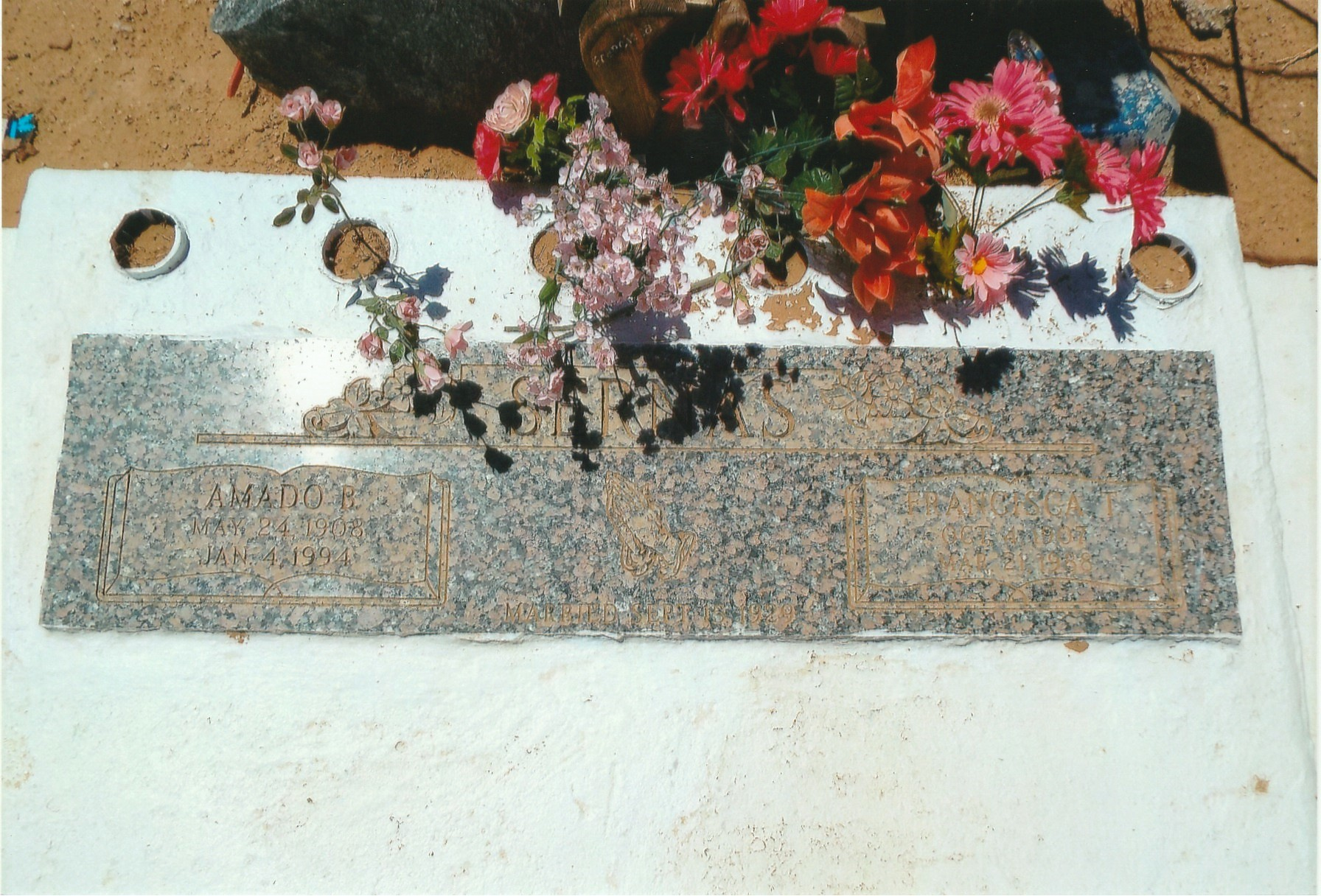
Inscription on the Sernas tomb

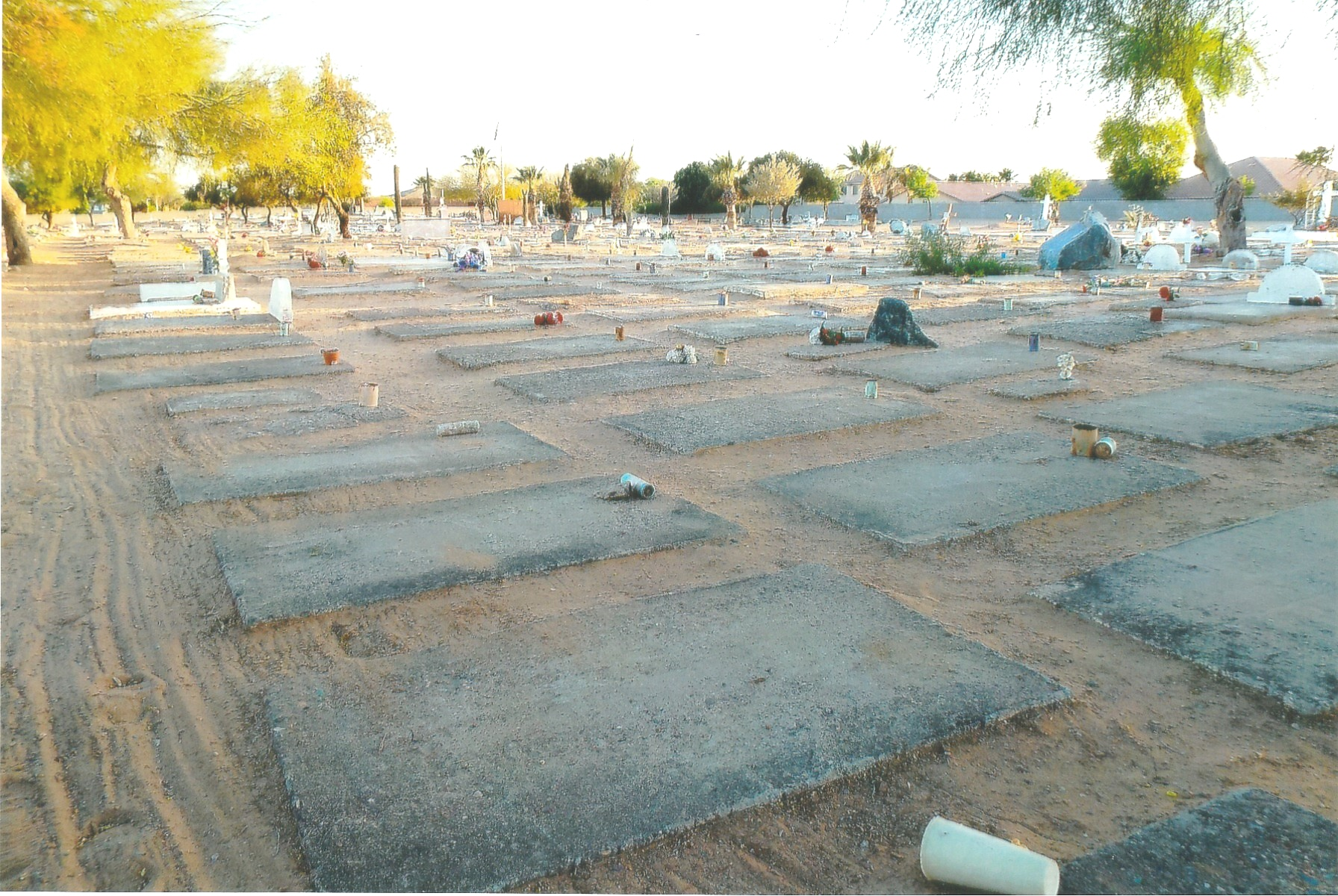
Unmarked graves

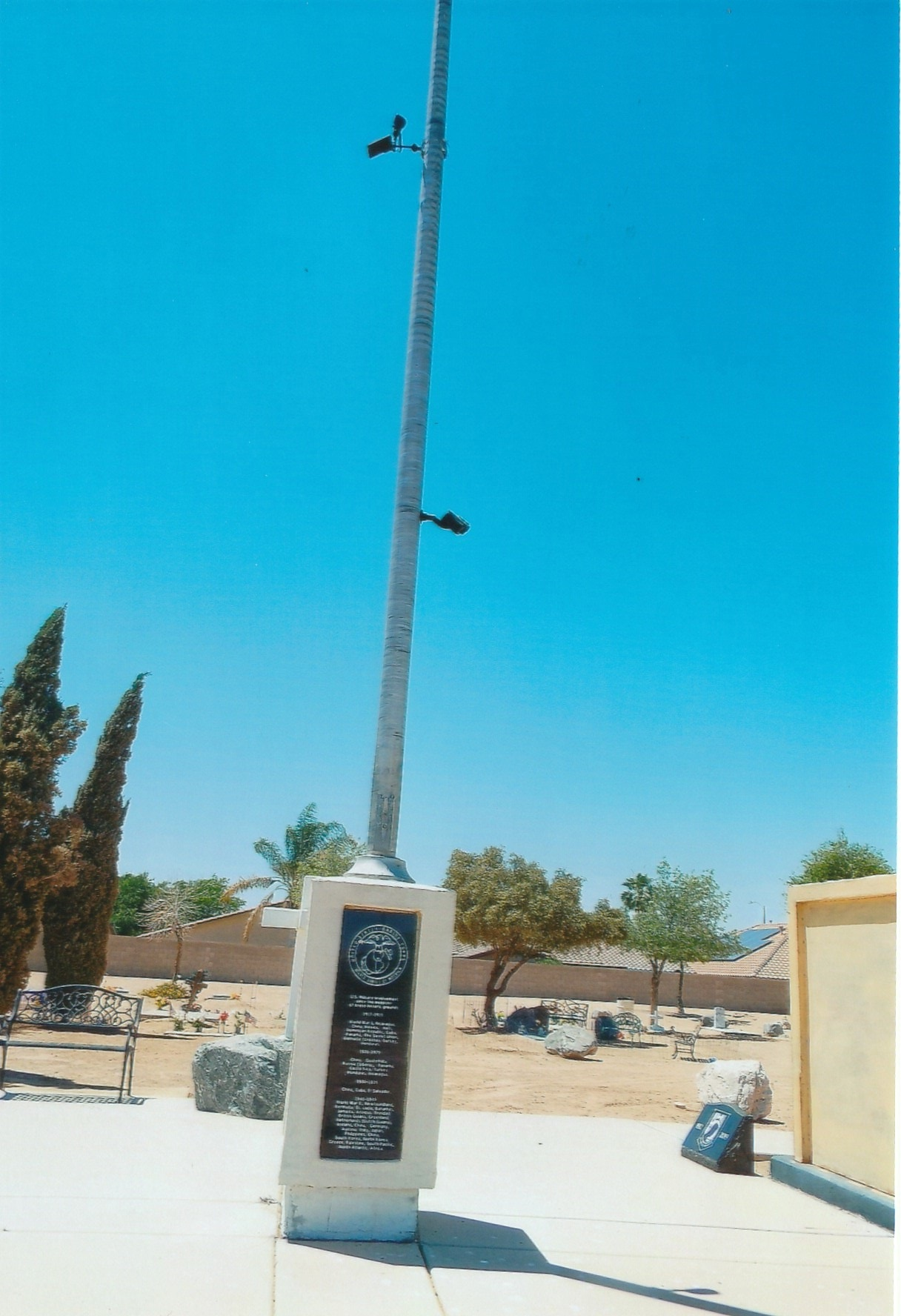
Flag Pole

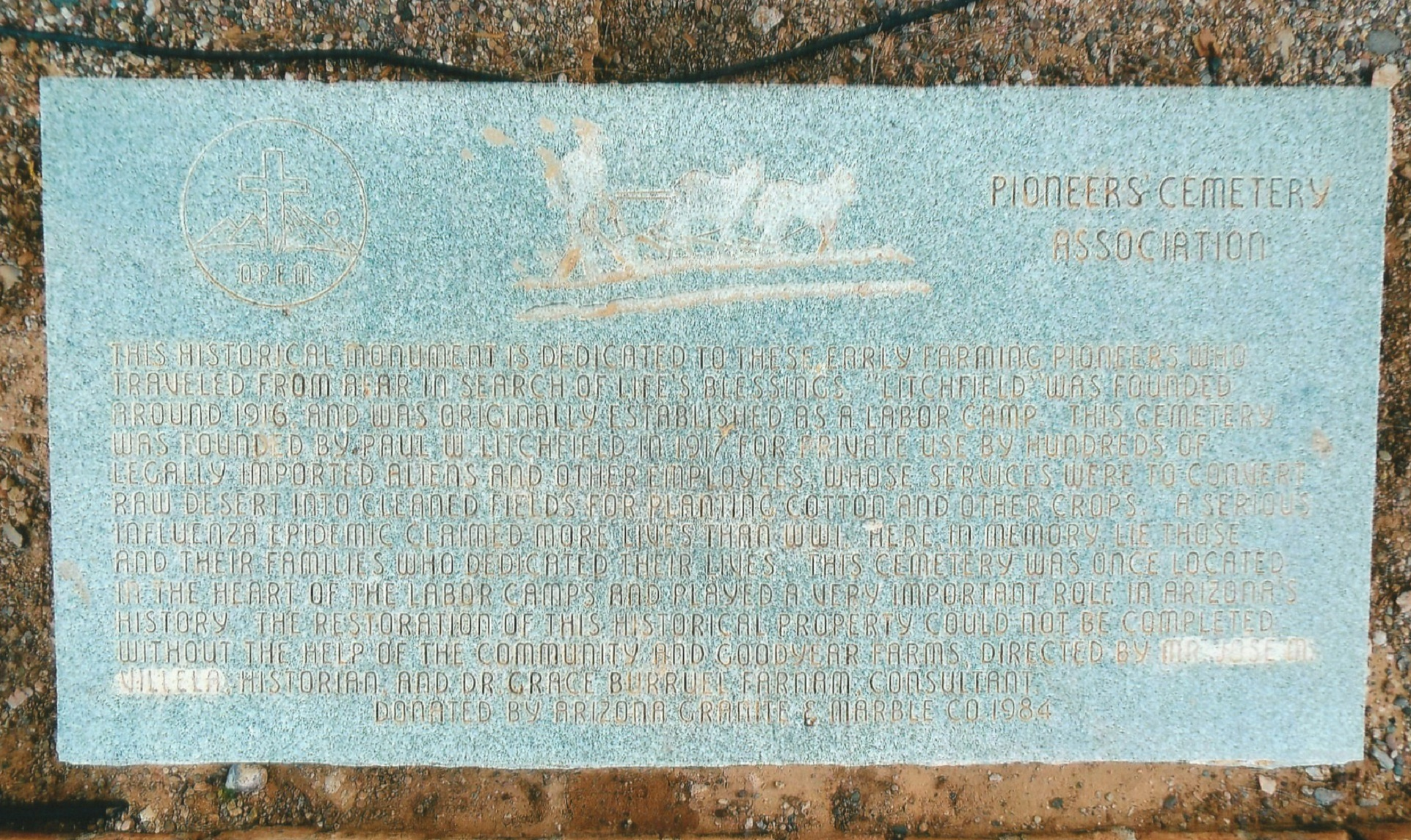
Mural dedication

== See also ==
- Litchfield Park, Arizona
- Goodyear, Arizona
- Avondale, Arizona
- Adamsville A.O.U.W. Cemetery
- Glendale Memorial Park Cemetery
- Pioneer and Military Memorial Park
- Double Butte Cemetery
- Home Mission Cemetery
- Greenwood/Memory Lawn Mortuary & Cemetery
- St. Francis Catholic Cemetery
- Historic Pinal Cemetery
- National Register of Historic Places listings in Maricopa County, Arizona
