= Kenneth B. McMicken =

Arizona businessman and pioneer (1882–1959)

- McMicken shows his multitude of awards.
- Born: August 19, 1882; Brooklyn, New York
- Died: April 6, 1959 (aged 77); Litchfield Park, Arizona
- Education: New York State College of Agriculture
- Occupations: Farmer; Superintendent, general manager, and vice president of Southwest Cotton Company
- Spouse(s): Ada Louise Chase (m. 1904; div. 1914) Ethel Mercia Fisher (m. 1915)

Kenneth B. McMicken was an agricultural pioneer and vice president of the Southwest Cotton Company (later Goodyear Farms). He is responsible for innovations in numerous growing methods, especially long staple cotton, as well as flood control in the West Valley.

== Early life ==
Kenneth Bruce McMicken was born in Brooklyn, New York around on August 19, 1882. He was interested in farming from a young age, as his family possessed several farms.

He attended Adelphi Academy of Brooklyn, then graduated from the Polytechnic Institute of Brooklyn. He later attended New York State College of Agriculture at Cornell University.

== Career ==
At the request of his cousin, Paul W. Litchfield, McMicken travelled to Arizona to help him grow cotton for the Goodyear Tire and Rubber Company in 1918. Due to submarine warfare during World War I, Egypt's cotton became nearly impossible to import, and the U.S. South simultaneously faced a boll weevil infestation. As a result, Goodyear was looking for a new supply of cotton, and McMicken was sent to Arizona to explore the possibility of starting a cotton growing operation there.

McMicken found the region to be similar to that of Egypt, and began Goodyear's cotton operation. The first ranch was founded near present-day Chandler, with later operations established further west. McMicken travelled to Egypt in 1919 to study their long-staple cotton growing methods.

McMicken became a leading authority on cotton and greater agriculture. He worked with the University of Arizona in developing pure seed strains that would create greater crop stability and harvest yields. He played an instrumental part in the Arizona Crop Improvement Association, an organization that aimed to produce better agricultural seeds. McMicken assisted in the association's creation and served as the vice chairman of the executive committee for a time. His expertise garnered international recognition for his cotton cultivation. The Peruvian government sought his advice to improve their cotton industry in 1928 to modernize the practices in cotton growing. In 1943, he represented the entire United States cotton belt at meetings in Washington, D.C. on boll weevil control.

The farm also had an experimental station where they grew a variety of subtropical plants and trees, grown to learn about how they would fare under Arizona's hot and dry weather conditions.

After the war, the price of cotton began to fall, and dipped further after the stock market crash in 1929. With cotton prices down and fewer tires needed, Southwest Cotton began to pivot to other operations such as raising sheep and cattle, and growing citrus trees. Around 1937, Pima cotton was phased out of use in tires, as Goodyear turned to rayon for tire production. New enterprises developed in the mid-1940s, with the farm chiefly growing cotton, alfalfa, barley, wheat, maize and sorghum grains. The Southwest Cotton Company was officially renamed Goodyear Farms in 1943 to reflect their reduction in cotton growing.

McMicken also developed notable cattle feeding, pest control, and soil conservation methods, forming the Agua Fria Soil Conservation District in 1945 along with other local farmers, and serving as the district's chairman.

McMicken created instrumental preventative flood control methods for the West Valley, most notably the McMicken Dam in northwestern Surprise. Three successive monsoon storms in the summer of 1951 caused $3 million in damages across the West Valley. Much of the area's farmland topsoil was washed away, highway and railroad bridges were washed out, many telephone poles and power lines were downed, Luke AFB and Litchfield Naval Air Facility (now Phoenix Goodyear Airport) were under several feet of water, and numerous homes in Litchfield Park, Goodyear, and Avondale were destroyed. Senator Carl Hayden was asked to help, and ultimately allocated funds to a dam to protect the area from floodwaters coming from the Trilby Wash and Beardsley Canal.

McMicken served on Arizona's Commission of Agriculture and Horticulture for over 25 years, during 16 of which he oversaw the commission as chairman.

After 40 years dedicated to Goodyear's farming operations in Arizona and serving as Goodyear Farms's vice president and general manager, McMicken retired in 1958 at the age of 76. He continued to share his wealth of agricultural knowledge as a director and consultant for the farm. He served in these capacities until his death in 1959.

== Personal life ==
McMicken married Ada Chase on April 27, 1904. The two had two children together, Jean and Mary Elizabeth McMicken. In 1912, Kenneth sued to divorce Ada, accusing her of an extramarital affair with his brother. The judge found his case to lack sufficient evidence and denied the divorce. Two years later, in 1914, Ada divorced Kenneth on the grounds that he had participated in adulterous acts.

McMicken remarried in January 1915 to Ethel Fisher. They had two sons, David and Robert.

== Death and legacy ==
In 1952, McMicken was the first person awarded the Arizona FFA Agriculturist of the Year award, for his achievements in farming with Goodyear Farms. He was inducted into the Arizona Farm and Ranch Hall of Fame in 2012.

McMicken died on April 6, 1959 at his home in Litchfield Park.

His work is highlighted in exhibits at the P.W. Litchfield Heritage Center in Litchfield Park.

McMicken is referenced throughout the west valley, notably in Surprise, with the city planning a park on the McMicken Dam site, as well as McMicken Way being named for him.
