= Home Mission Cemetery =

Historic cemetery in Maricopa County, Arizona, United States

- Sleeping Bride Cemetery; Thompson Cemetery
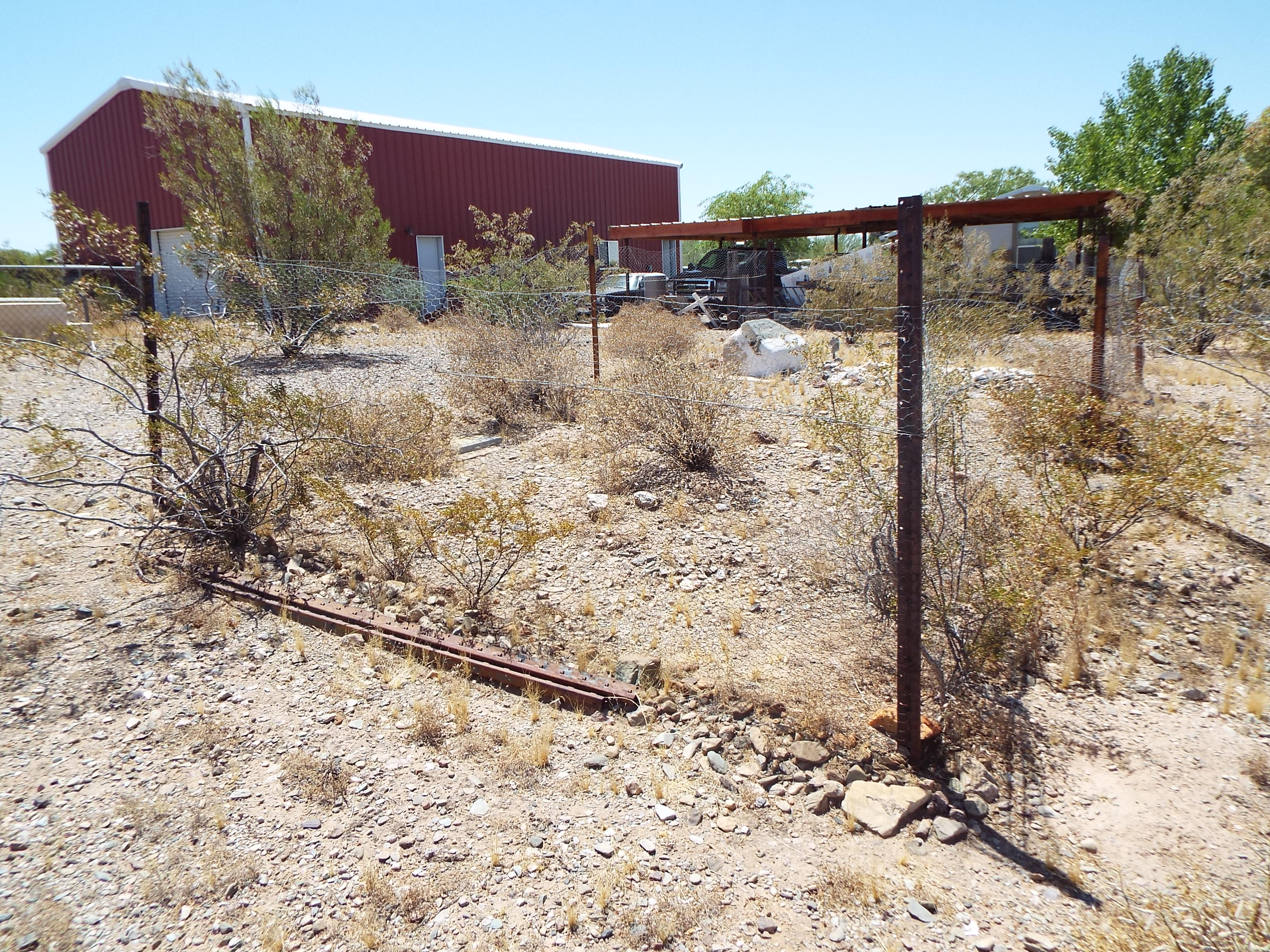
- Home Mission Cemetery

Details
- Established: 1936
- Abandoned: Abandoned
- Location: West Dove Wing Drive; Surprise, Arizona
- Country: U.S.
- Coordinates: 33.7569°N 112.4248°W
- No. of graves: 14

The Home Mission Cemetery is a historic cemetery located on West Dove Wing Way in the Maricopa County of Arizona, United States, slightly outside of the Surprise town border. The cemetery is also known as the "Sleeping Bride Cemetery", the "Thompson Cemetery", and The "Rhodes Cemetery". The Pioneers' Cemetery Association (PCA) defines a "historic cemetery" as one which has been in existence for more than fifty years.

== History ==
Lewis and his wife Marie Thompson were homesteaders who settled down in the area which is now part of the town of Surprise. In 1936, Marie established a small cemetery in one acre of the Thompson family ranch. The Thompson's would regularly hold Bible studies in their ranch house. In 1936, their son, 15 year-old Robert Thompson and his friend were playing with a gun when suddenly it accidentally went off and fatally shot him. Thus, he became the first person to be buried in the cemetery.

In the 1950s the property, which included the cemetery, was passed on to Reverent James Outlaw, a Pentecostal preacher and his religious Mission. The members of the Mission were the ones who called the cemetery the "Sleeping Bride Cemetery". This was within the believe that Christians are brides of Christ.

Thirty-seven graves have been identified so far. The most common surnames in the cemetery are those of the Thompson's and Rhodes'. The Surprise Historical Society is in process of restoring, preserving and maintaining the cemetery as a Pioneer Cemetery.

== Graves ==
Historic Home Mission Cemetery

(Sleeping Bride Cemetery)

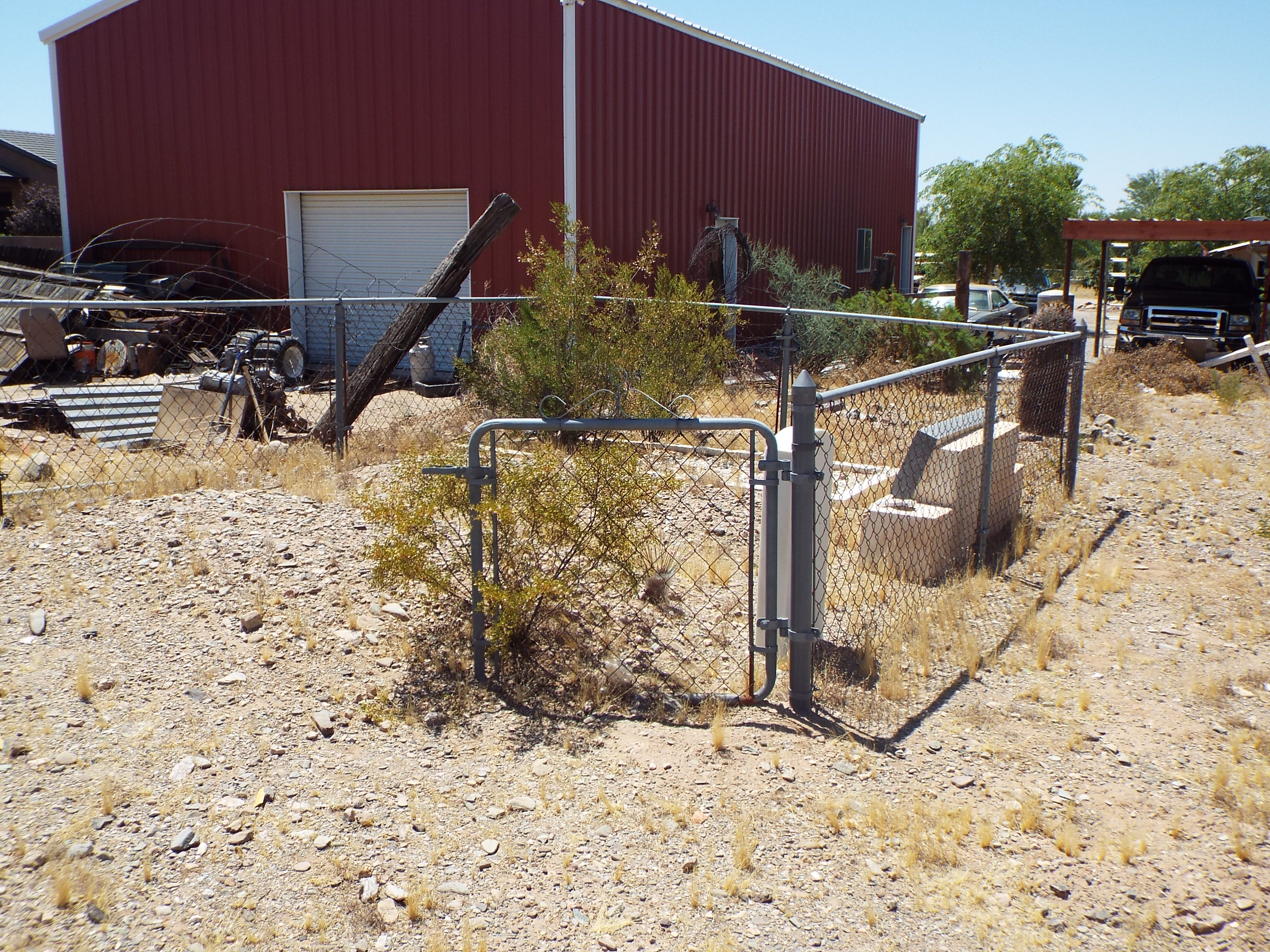
Home Mission Cemetery

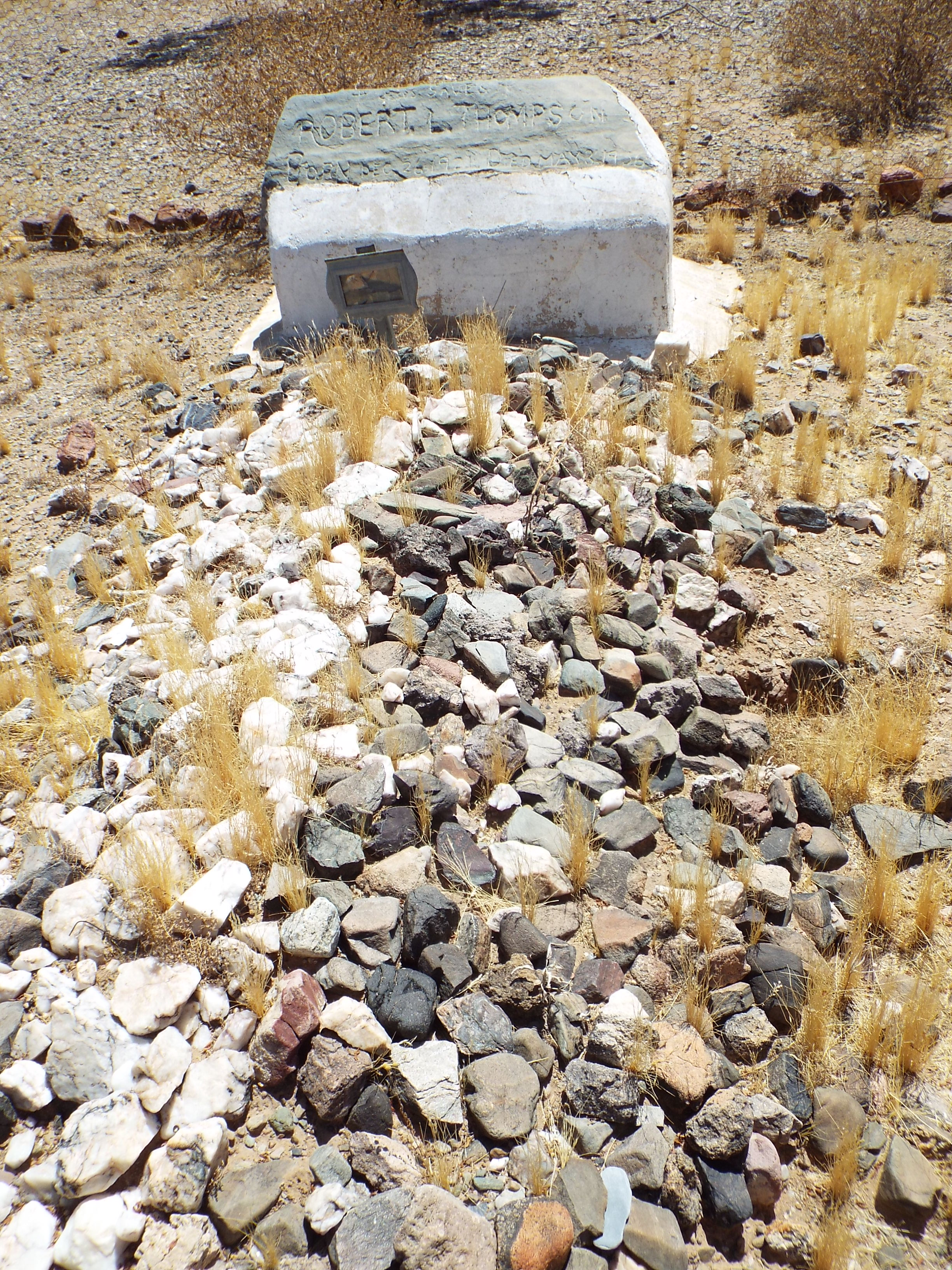
Grave of Robert Thompson (1921–1936)

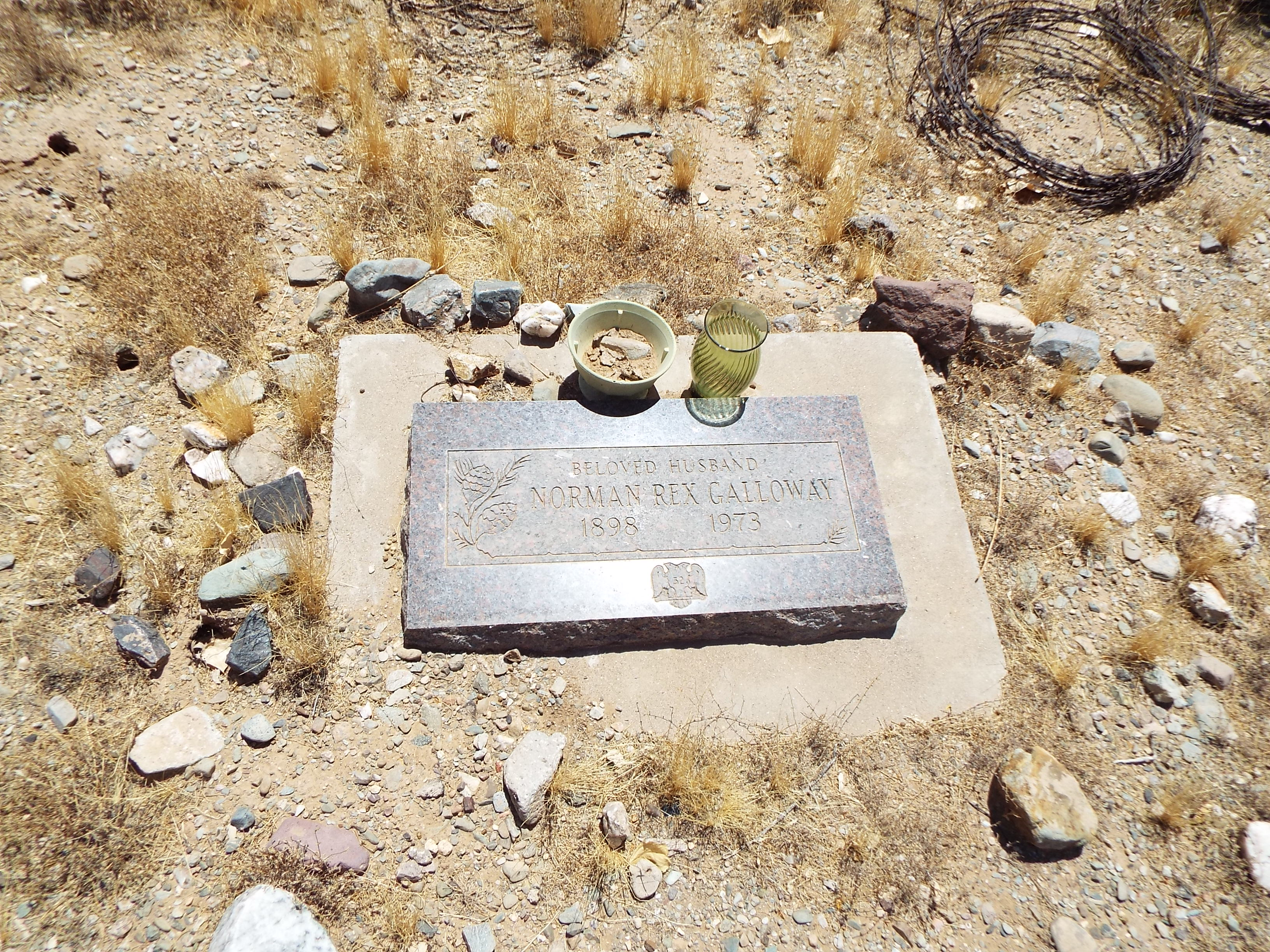
Grave of Norman Rex Galloway (1898–1973)

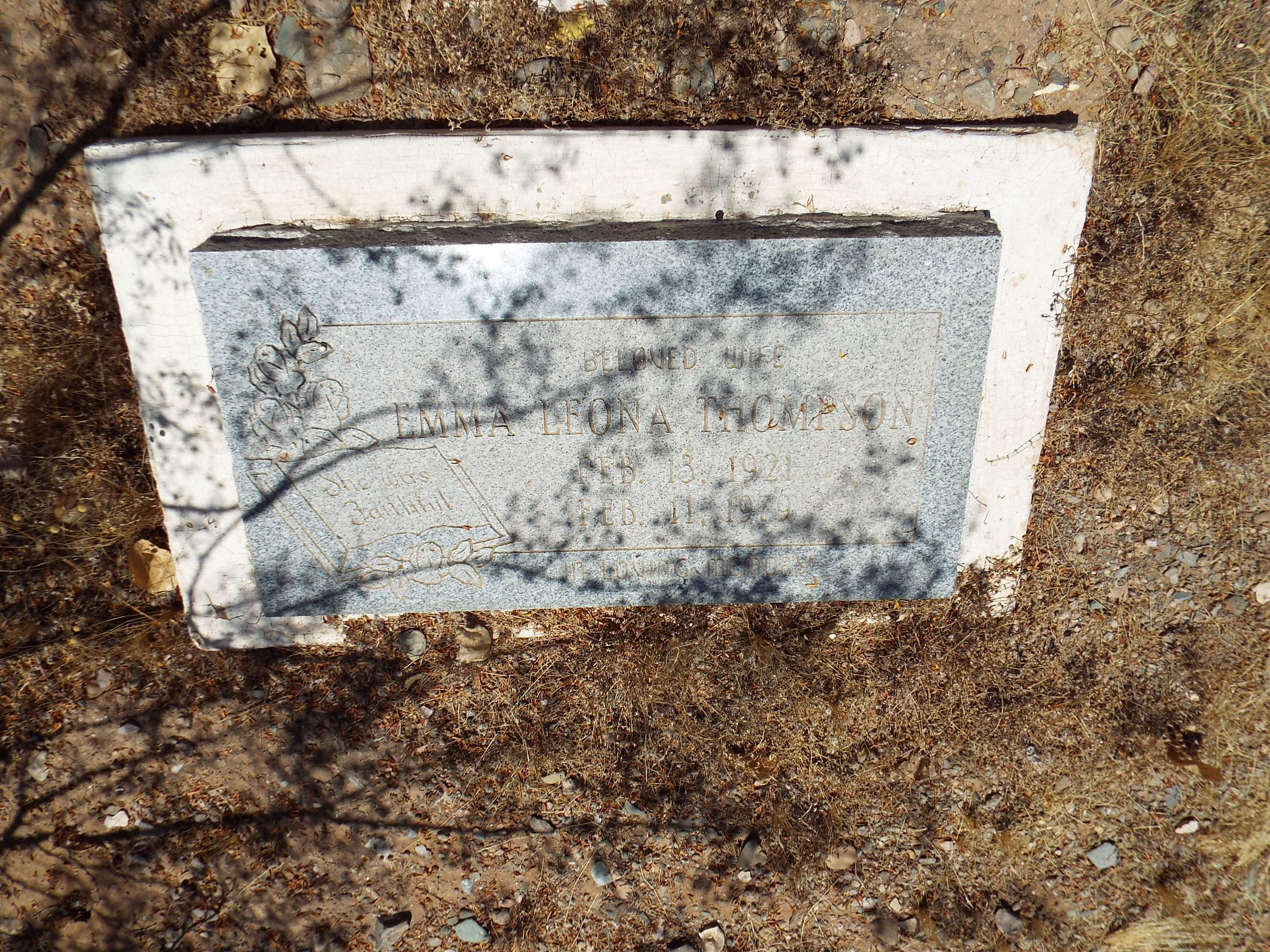
Grave of Emma Leona Thompson (1921–1989)

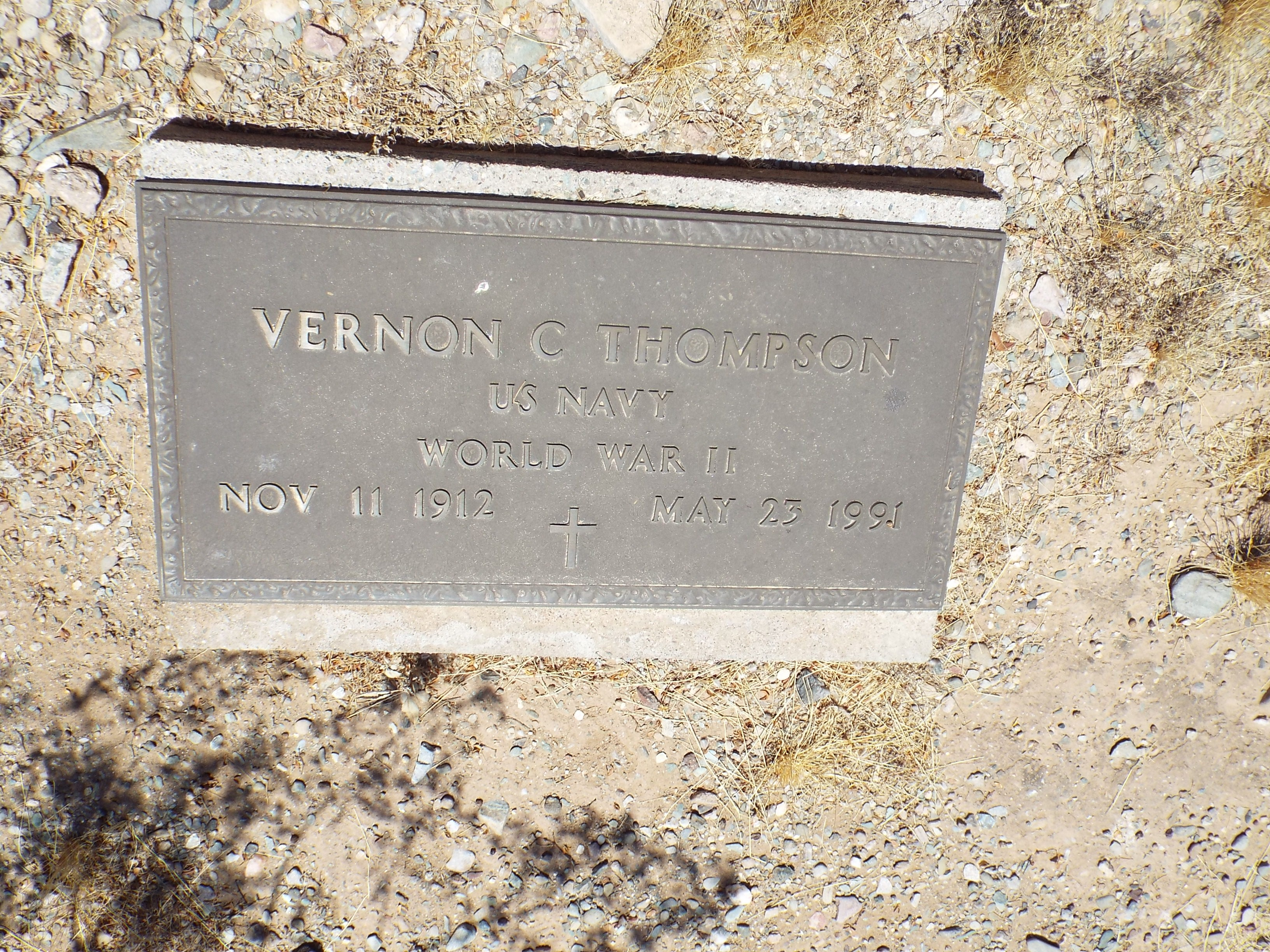
Grave of Vernon C. Thompson (1912–1991)

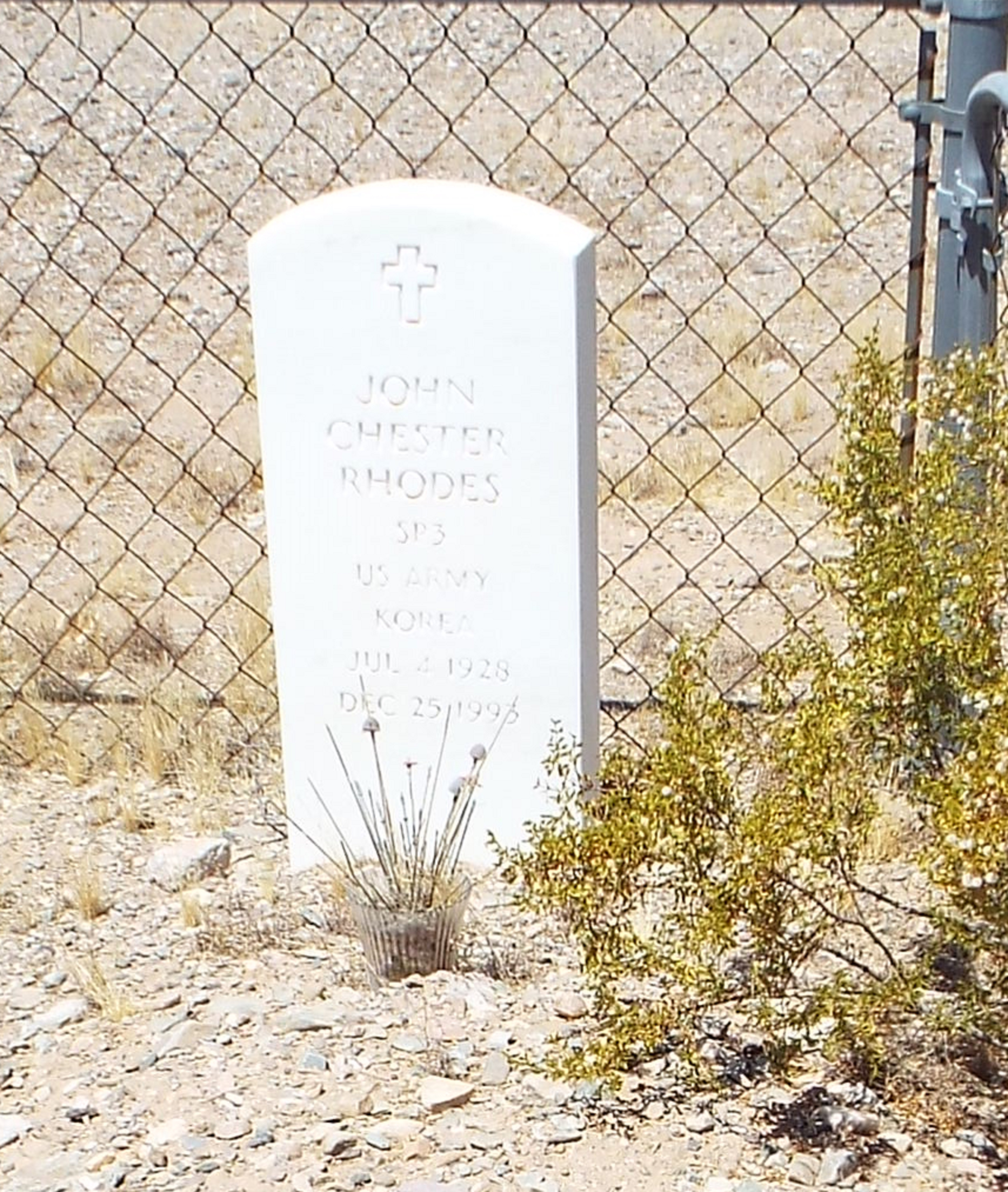
Grave of John Chester Rhodes (1928–1993)

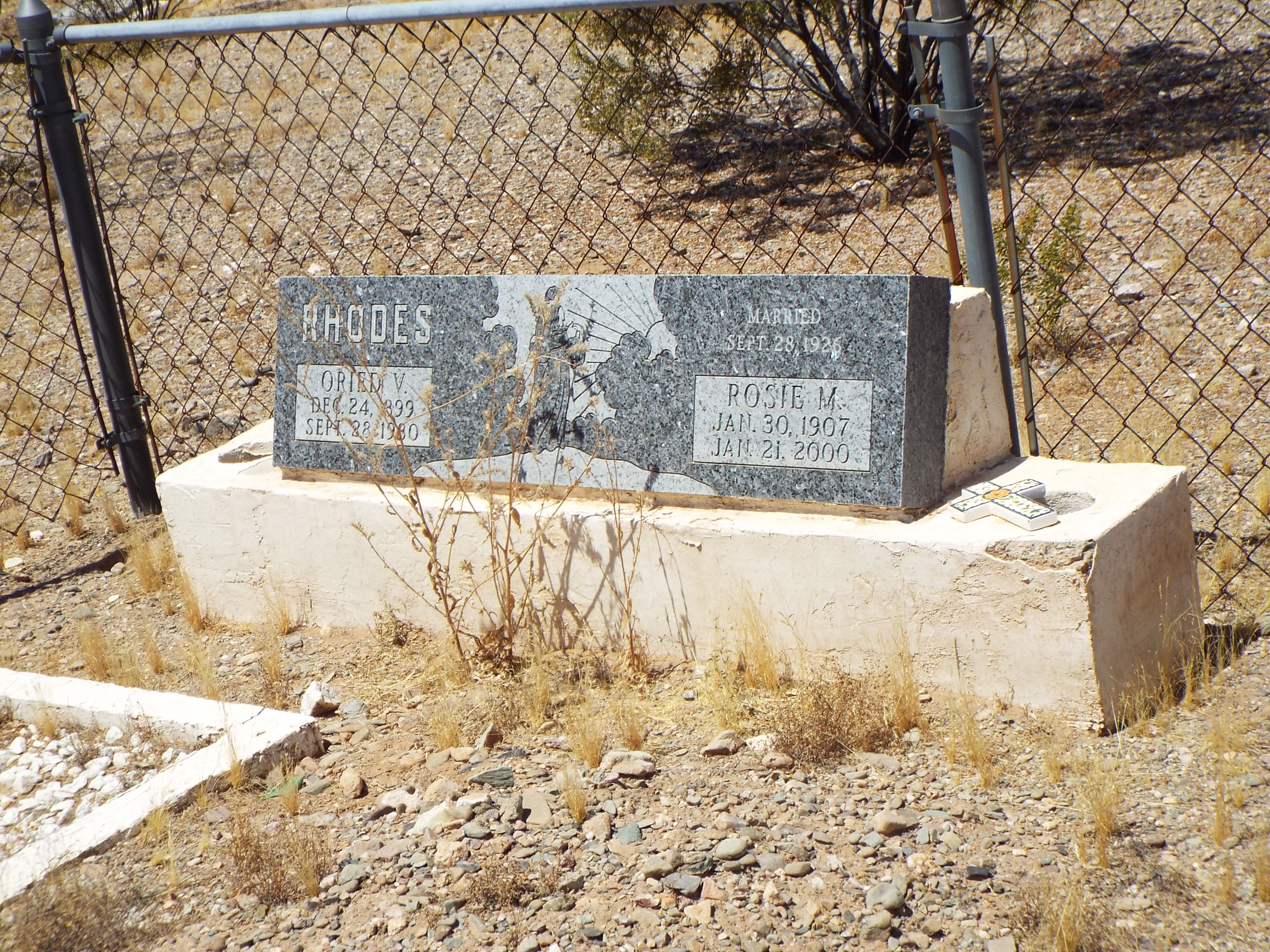
Graves of Oried V. Rhodes (1899–1980) and Rosie M. Rhodes (1907–2000)

== See also ==
- Adamsville A.O.U.W. Cemetery
- City of Mesa Cemetery
- Pioneer and Military Memorial Park
- Glendale Memorial Park Cemetery
- Double Butte Cemetery
- Greenwood/Memory Lawn Mortuary & Cemetery
- Goodyear Farms Historic Cemetery
- St. Francis Catholic Cemetery
- Historic Pinal Cemetery
