= P.W. Litchfield Heritage Center =

Non-profit history museum in Litchfield Park, AZ

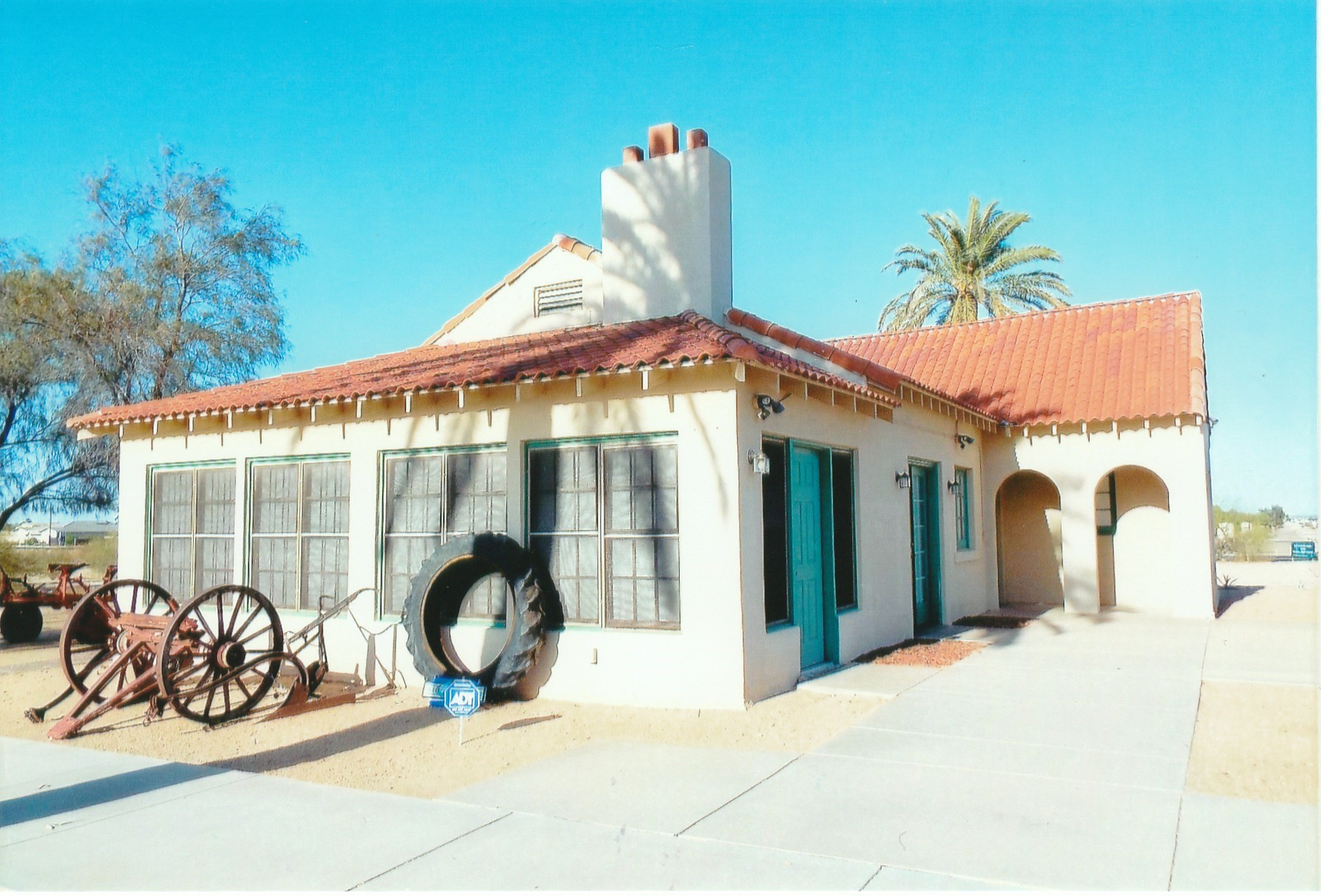
- Aunt Mary’s House that houses the museum.

- Location within Arizona
- Abbreviation: PWLHC
- Predecessor: Litchfield Park Historical Society
- Founded: September 2001; 25 years ago
- Founder: Celeste Crouch
- Type: non-profit
- Location: Litchfield Park, Arizona
- Coordinates: 33.5086438°N 112.3591475°W
- Website: pwlhc.org

The P.W. Litchfield Heritage Center is a history museum located in Litchfield Park, Arizona.The museum focuses on the preservation of artifacts and stories of the city as well as those related Paul W. Litchfield and his impact on the region in the west valley on surrounding cities such as Goodyear, Avondale, and Tolleson.

== History ==
The organization was founded as the Litchfield Park Historical Society in September 2001. In the early years, the museum’s collections were housed and managed jointly by Arizona State University and the University of Akron. The museum found a home in Aunt Mary’s house, a cottage utilized by Florence Litchfield’s aunt on Litchfield’s Rancho La Loma estate in 2008, used only as an office and storage place initially. The society leases the house from Sun Health to whom the land was donated to in 1995 by Litchfield’s daughter Edith and her husband, Wallace. The historical society welcomed its first guests into its museum space on October 21, 2012. The museum has four gallery spaces containing historical photos and artifacts focusing on Litchfield’s endeavors in the area.

The museum was certified by the Arizona Historical Society on February 1, 2014 as an affiliate museum. This recognition is rewarded to organizations that apply standards established by the American Association for State and Local History and the American Alliance of Museums and allows them support through grants and workshops.

In spring of 2019, the center announced plans to move into the Litchfield/Denny house, the primary residence in Rancho La Loma, in order to create a larger museum and cultural space. Pamela Denny Blackford, granddaughter to Paul and Florence Litchfield, and her husband John helped raise funds for this relocation, after the family donated the estate to the city. PWLHC would lease the home from the city and collaborate on its development into a public space.

When the nearby Three Rivers Historical Society, which centered around the history of the Goodyear and Avondale areas closed following the COVID-19 pandemic, they joined forces with the Litchfield Park Historical Society. Three Rivers donated their artifacts and archival materials and merged their membership. The LPHS expanded its purview to encompass the history, arts, and culture of the greater Southwest Valley.

In 2023, the Historical Society changed its name, becoming the P.W. Litchfield Heritage Center to better align with their new scope of historical topics as well as prepare for its move to the larger space. The groundbreaking for the renovation of the new facility took place on March 3, 2026.
