= Litchfield Park, Arizona =

City in Arizona, United States

- City
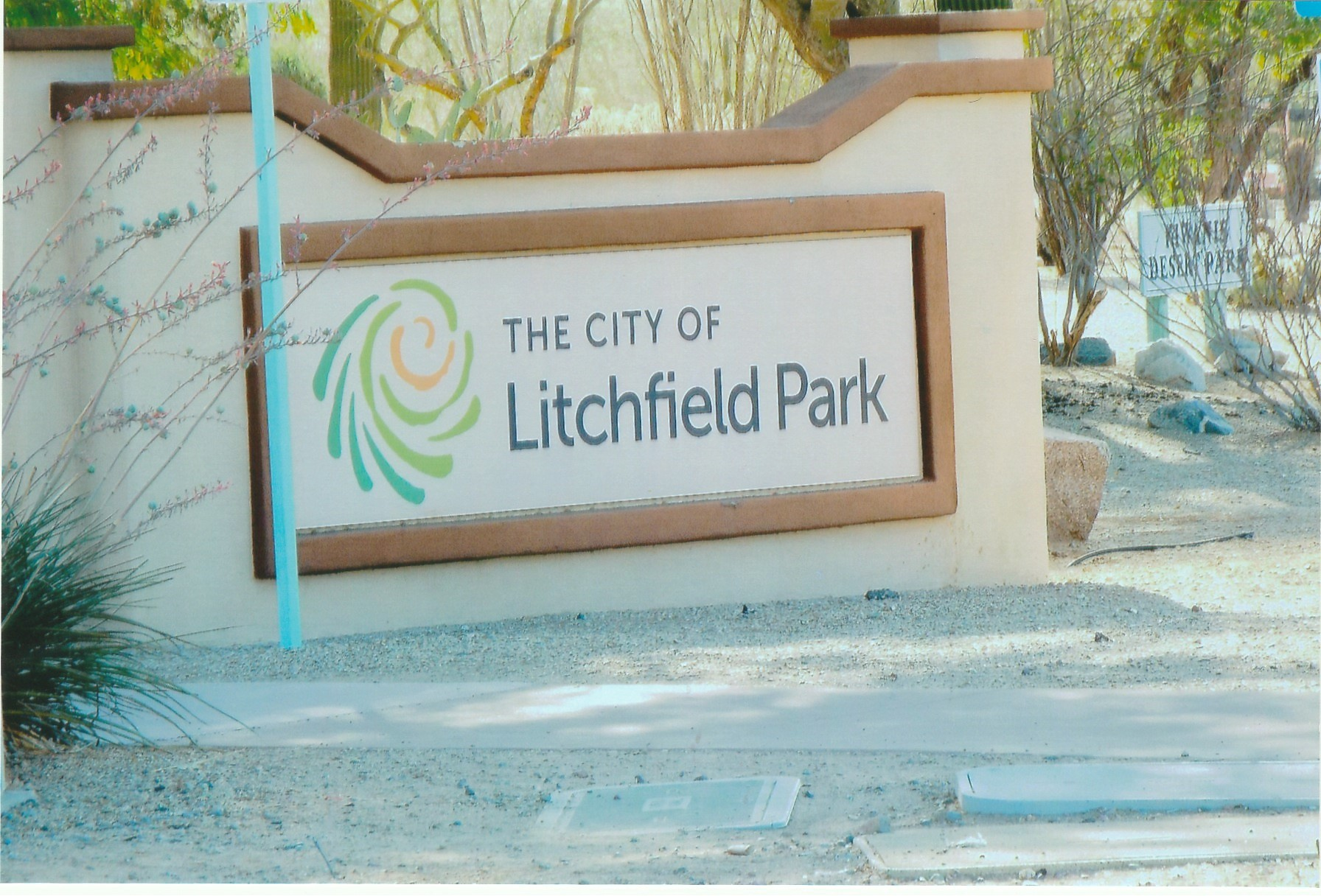
- Welcome sign

- Flag Seal

- Location in Maricopa County, Arizona

- Location within Arizona Location within the United States
- Coordinates: 33°29′42″N 112°21′30″W
- Country: United States
- State: Arizona
- County: Maricopa

Government
  - Mayor: Thomas L. Schoaf

Area
  - Total: 3.31 sq mi (8.57 km^{2})
  - Land: 3.28 sq mi (8.49 km^{2})
  - Water: 0.031 sq mi (0.08 km^{2})
- Elevation: 1,053 ft (321 m)

Population (2020)
  - Total: 6,847
  - Density: 2,088.0/sq mi (806.18/km^{2})
- Time zone: UTC-7 (MST (no DST))
- ZIP code: 85340
- Area code: 623
- FIPS code: 04-41330
- GNIS feature ID: 2410842
- Website: www.litchfieldpark.gov

Litchfield Park is a city in Maricopa County, Arizona, United States. It is located 19 miles (31 km) west of Phoenix. As of the 2020 census, the population of the city was 6,847, up from 5,476 in 2010.

== History ==
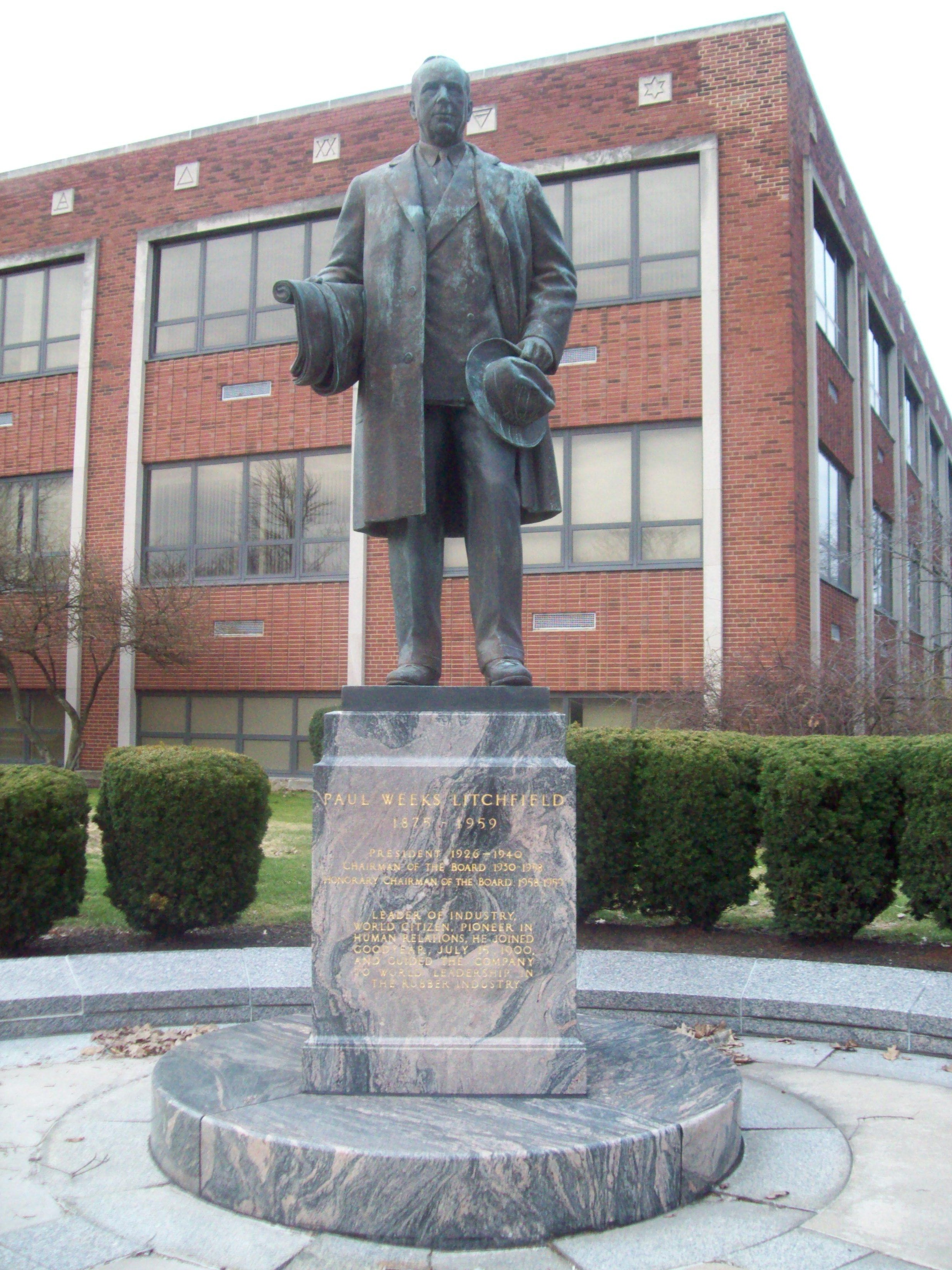
Statue of Paul W. Litchfield in Akron, Ohio, headquarters of the Goodyear Tire & Rubber Company

The town of Litchfield Park is a community outside of Phoenix named after its founder, Paul Weeks Litchfield (1875–1959). He was an executive of the Goodyear Tire & Rubber Company who came to the Phoenix area in 1916 in search of suitable land to farm a long-staple cotton that had previously been available only from the Sea Islands off the coast of Georgia and from Egypt. This cotton was needed to strengthen the rubber in the pneumatic tire, of which Goodyear was the world's largest producer. The East Coast cotton supply had been devastated by the boll weevil, and the African supply had been greatly reduced by World War I attacks from German U-boats. Litchfield went to the Phoenix area at the suggestion of the US Department of Agriculture, but was not successful in motivating local farmers to grow his cotton. Instead, he got Goodyear to form the Southwest Cotton Company in Phoenix, with Litchfield as its president, eventually purchasing some 36,000 acres (15,000 ha) in the general Salt River Valley area, including 5,000 acres (2,000 ha) around the present site of Litchfield Park, then known as Litchfield Ranch. Much of the land was bought for as little as $25 per acre. The cotton was cultivated with a workforce of mostly Mexican and Native American men, with year-round operations overseen by Litchfield’s cousin, Kenneth McMicken. The U.S. Postal Service agreed to the name "Litchfield Park" in 1926. In 1929, the Wigwam Resort was opened to the public. In 1926, Litchfield went on to become the president of the Goodyear-Zeppelin Corporation, and then chairman of the board in 1930. He retired from the company in 1958, and spent the final months of his life as a resident of Litchfield Park at his home on Fairway Drive.

In 1964, Goodyear created Litchfield Park Land and Development Co. to expand Litchfield Park into a 90,000-resident community. Arden E. Goodyear was the head of the company, Patrick Cusick was vice president and general manager, and Victor Gruen was hired to design some of the buildings. Emanuel Cartsonis, who had worked with Cusick, became city planner. The plan called for 25,000 homes, a college, a junior college, eighteen elementary schools, ten junior high schools, and six high schools, as well as improvements to the town's golf course and Phoenix Trotting Park at an expense of at least $750 million. Goodyear made many mistakes during development, including selling properties right up to the curb line, which means that the city must get permission from property owners before they can put in a sidewalk. They abandoned their plans for expanding Litchfield Park before they were completed and sold whatever land they could.

== Geography ==
Litchfield Park is bordered to the southeast by Avondale, to the west by Goodyear, and to the north by Glendale.

According to the United States Census Bureau, the city has a total area of 3.3 square miles (8.5 km^{2}), of which 0.03 square miles (0.08 km^{2}), or 0.94%, are water.

=== Climate ===
Litchfield Park has a hot desert climate (Köppen BWh).

Climate data for Litchfield Park, Arizona, 1991–2020 normals, extremes 1917–2021
Month	Jan	Feb	Mar	Apr	May	Jun	Jul	Aug	Sep	Oct	Nov	Dec	Year
Record high °F (°C)	89 (32)	93 (34)	100 (38)	105 (41)	115 (46)	125 (52)	125 (52)	118 (48)	116 (47)	109 (43)	98 (37)	89 (32)	125 (52)
Mean maximum °F (°C)	76.6 (24.8)	80.5 (26.9)	89.9 (32.2)	98.3 (36.8)	105.2 (40.7)	113.6 (45.3)	115.0 (46.1)	113.1 (45.1)	108.1 (42.3)	99.6 (37.6)	87.6 (30.9)	75.4 (24.1)	116.4 (46.9)
Mean daily maximum °F (°C)	66.1 (18.9)	70.2 (21.2)	77.7 (25.4)	85.5 (29.7)	94.3 (34.6)	104.0 (40.0)	106.5 (41.4)	104.7 (40.4)	99.3 (37.4)	88.1 (31.2)	74.6 (23.7)	64.5 (18.1)	86.3 (30.2)
Daily mean °F (°C)	54.5 (12.5)	58.1 (14.5)	64.4 (18.0)	71.3 (21.8)	79.8 (26.6)	88.8 (31.6)	93.8 (34.3)	92.6 (33.7)	86.5 (30.3)	74.5 (23.6)	61.9 (16.6)	53.2 (11.8)	73.3 (22.9)
Mean daily minimum °F (°C)	42.9 (6.1)	45.9 (7.7)	51.2 (10.7)	57.0 (13.9)	65.3 (18.5)	73.7 (23.2)	81.2 (27.3)	80.6 (27.0)	73.8 (23.2)	60.9 (16.1)	49.3 (9.6)	42.0 (5.6)	60.3 (15.7)
Mean minimum °F (°C)	31.2 (−0.4)	35.7 (2.1)	40.3 (4.6)	45.9 (7.7)	53.5 (11.9)	62.8 (17.1)	70.6 (21.4)	71.4 (21.9)	61.2 (16.2)	47.9 (8.8)	37.6 (3.1)	30.5 (−0.8)	28.7 (−1.8)
Record low °F (°C)	16 (−9)	22 (−6)	22 (−6)	27 (−3)	36 (2)	49 (9)	57 (14)	50 (10)	44 (7)	31 (−1)	22 (−6)	20 (−7)	16 (−9)
Average precipitation inches (mm)	0.96 (24)	1.20 (30)	0.95 (24)	0.29 (7.4)	0.13 (3.3)	0.03 (0.76)	0.76 (19)	1.06 (27)	0.79 (20)	0.57 (14)	0.59 (15)	0.85 (22)	8.18 (208)
Average precipitation days	3.9	4.2	3.2	1.5	0.9	0.3	3.5	3.9	3.4	2.0	2.3	4.4	33.5
Source: NOAA

== Demographics ==
Historical population
Census	Pop.	Note	%±
1970	1,664		—
1980	3,657		119.8%
1990	3,303		−9.7%
2000	3,810		15.3%
2010	5,476		43.7%
2020	6,847		25.0%
2022 (est.)	6,960	▲	1.7%
U.S. Decennial Census

=== Racial and ethnic composition ===
Litchfield Park city, Arizona – Racial composition Note: the US Census treats Hispanic/Latino as an ethnic category. This table excludes Latinos from the racial categories and assigns them to a separate category. Hispanics/Latinos may be of any race.
Race (NH = Non-Hispanic)	2020	2010	2000	1990	1980
White alone (NH)	68.3% (4,679)	74.3% (4,071)	88.6% (3,377)	93.4% (3,085)	93.7% (3,428)
Black alone (NH)	3.3% (227)	3.4% (186)	1.3% (48)	0.6% (21)	0% (0)
American Indian alone (NH)	0.4% (27)	0.7% (41)	0.4% (14)	0.2% (8)	0.1% (5)
Asian alone (NH)	4.5% (306)	4.1% (222)	2.9% (109)	2.5% (82)	1.4% (51)
Pacific Islander alone (NH)	0.1% (4)	0% (1)	0.2% (7)		
Other race alone (NH)	0.5% (33)	0.1% (7)	0.1% (4)	0% (1)	0% (0)
Multiracial (NH)	4.4% (300)	1.9% (102)	1.1% (42)	—	—
Hispanic/Latino (any race)	18.6% (1,271)	15.4% (846)	5.5% (209)	3.2% (106)	4.7% (173)

=== 2020 census ===
As of the 2020 census, Litchfield Park had a population of 6,847. The median age was 45.7 years. 22.8% of residents were under the age of 18 and 22.9% of residents were 65 years of age or older. For every 100 females there were 91.5 males, and for every 100 females age 18 and over there were 89.7 males age 18 and over.

100.0% of residents lived in urban areas, while 0.0% lived in rural areas.

There were 2,618 households in Litchfield Park, of which 33.8% had children under the age of 18 living in them. Of all households, 62.4% were married-couple households, 12.0% were households with a male householder and no spouse or partner present, and 21.6% were households with a female householder and no spouse or partner present. About 20.9% of all households were made up of individuals and 12.3% had someone living alone who was 65 years of age or older.

There were 2,991 housing units, of which 12.5% were vacant. The homeowner vacancy rate was 3.4% and the rental vacancy rate was 12.2%.

== Government ==
The mayor is Tom Schoaf, the vice mayor is Paul Faith. The city council members are: Ann Donahue, Ron Clair, John Romack, Tom Rosztoczy, and Lisa Brainard Watson.

The first mayor was Charles Salem.

== Education ==
The Litchfield Elementary School District and the Agua Fria Union High School District serve Litchfield Park. Litchfield Elementary School District has some schools located in the city.

== Transportation ==
Litchfield Park is not a member of Valley Metro, the regional transportation system. Valley Metro's Avondale ZOOM neighborhood circulator serves the border of Litchfield Park and Avondale along parts of Indian School Road.

== Arts and culture ==
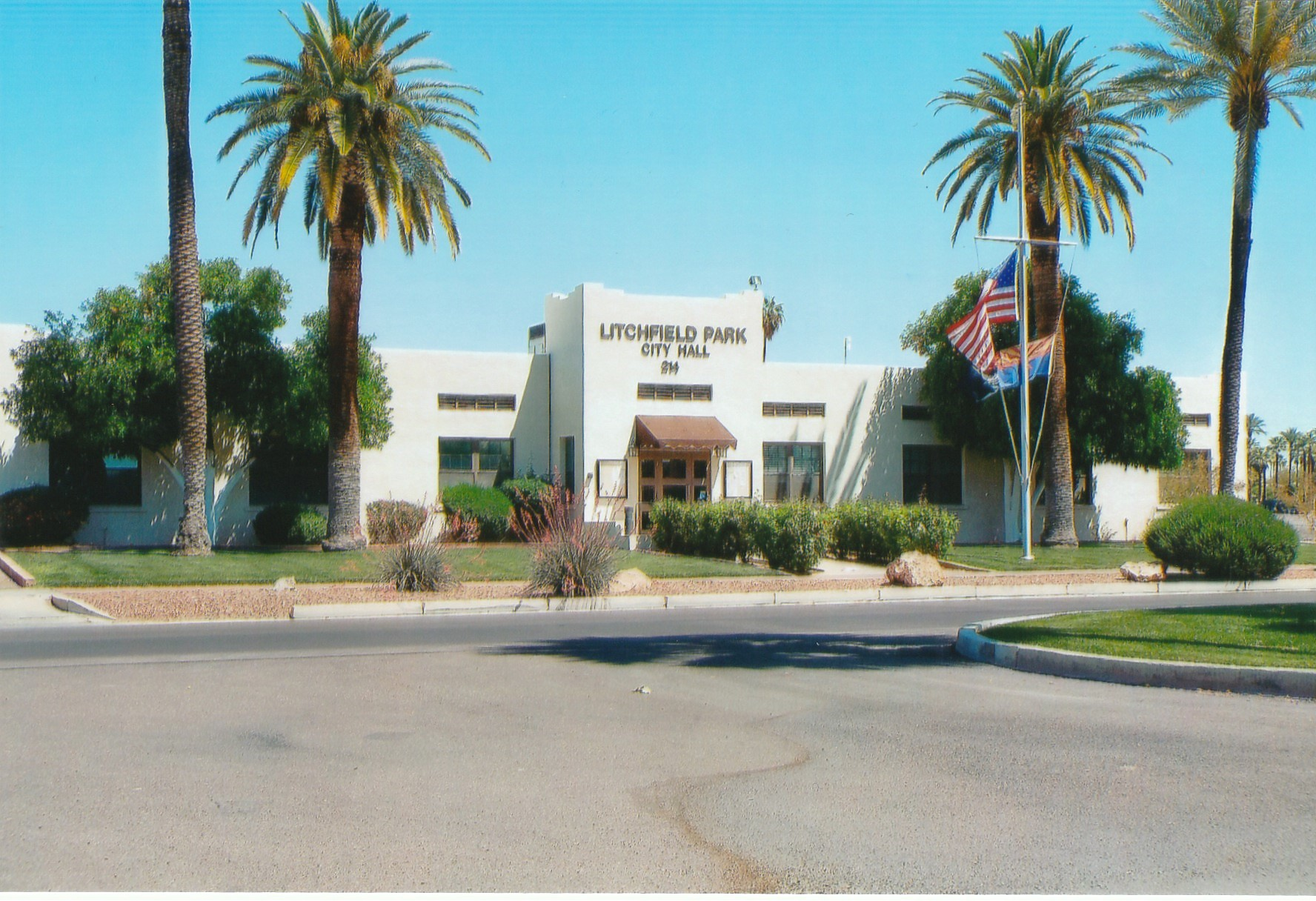
Litchfield Park City Hall

- Independence Day Fireworks Celebration

== Notable people ==
- Nathan Byrd, racing driver
- Ray King, former MLB relief pitcher
- Jacque Mercer, former Miss America
- Wayne Thornburg, Arizona state senator

== See also ==
- Goodyear Farms Historic Cemetery a.k.a. "Litchfield Cemetery"
