= Wigwam Hotel =

Historic hotel in Litchfield Park, Arizona

Wigwam Hotel and Resort
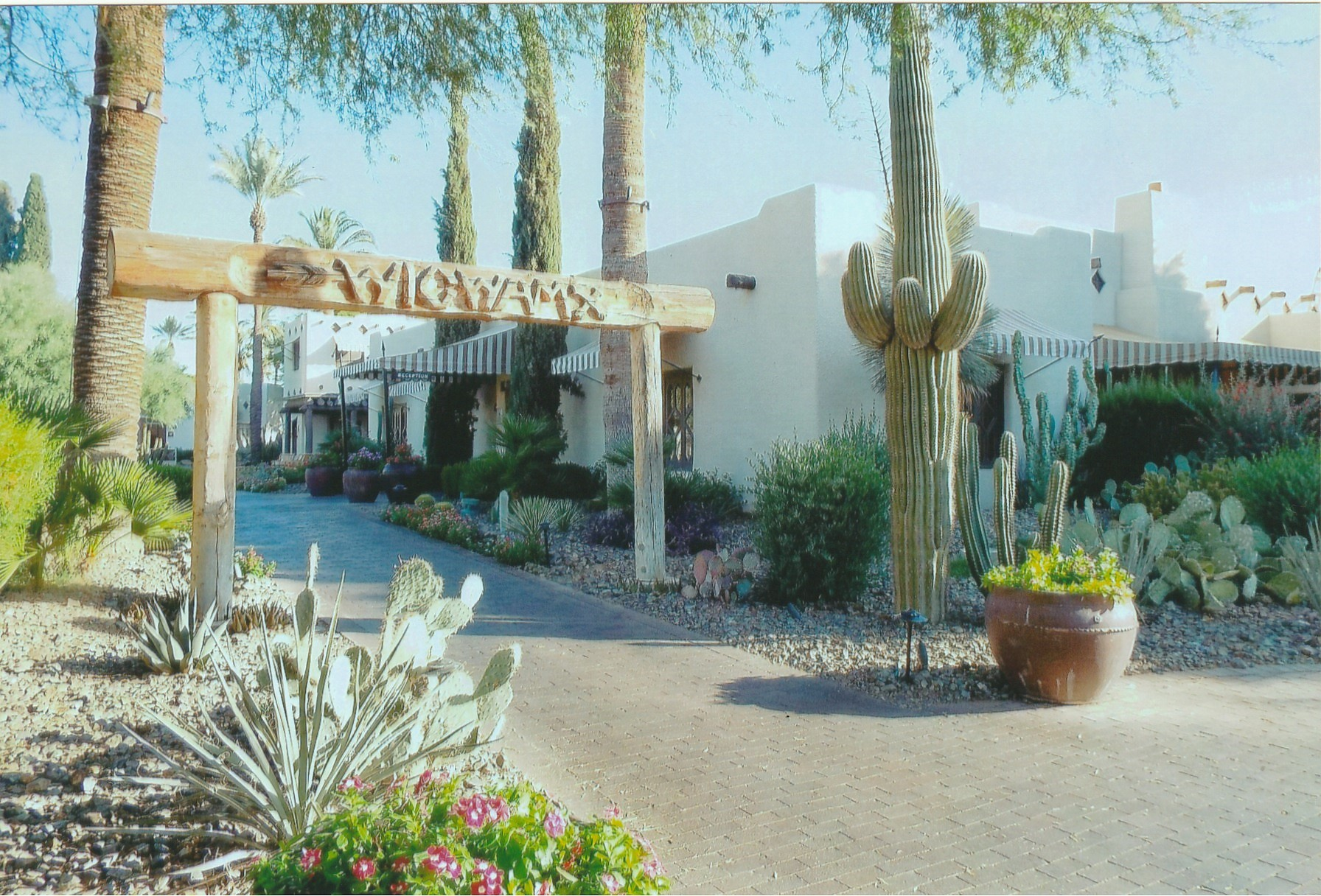
- Entrance to the Wigwam Hotel
- Interactive map of the Wigwam Hotel and Resort area

General information
- Architectural style: Spanish colonial
- Location: 300 E Wigwam Blvd, Litchfield Park, AZ 85340
- Coordinates: 33.4952°N 112.3551°W
- Opened: November 28, 1929
- Owner: JDM Partners

Technical details
- Size: 440 acres

Other information
- Number of rooms: 331
- Number of suites: 70
- Number of restaurants: 3

Website
- https://www.wigwamarizona.com

The Wigwam, also known as the Wigwam Hotel or Wigwam Resort, is a resort hotel in Litchfield Park, Arizona which opened in 1929.

== History ==
The Wigwam Hotel originally served only as guest housing for executives of the Goodyear Tire Company when they visited their cotton farms located in the area. Goodyear executive and primary overseer of the company’s cotton production, Paul W. Litchfield, built the hotel on his land in what is now Litchfield Park. The hotel opened to the public for the first time on Thanksgiving Day 1929.

The first building on the property was the Organization House, a meeting place for Goodyear built in 1918. The structure still stands today. The hotel has since expanded into a resort with 331 rooms. The resort includes such amenities as three golf courses, nine tennis courts, and three swimming pools.

During the Great Recession, in 2008, the property had gone bankrupt. Local businessman Jerry Colangelo, purchased the property. Colangelo’s company, JDM Partners, invested heavily in the resort making historically sensitive renovations.

The Wigwam Hotel has been listed by the National Trust for Historic Preservation as a member of the Historic Hotels of America since 2010. In 2022, the hotel was named by Historic Hotels of America as the best historic resort in the United States.

Among the celebrities who have stayed in the hotel are Maya Angelou, Donald Trump, Daniel Day-Lewis and Paul Newman.

== Golf Courses ==
In 1930, less than a year after the hotel opened to the public, a nine hole golf course was developed and opened at the resort. In 1935, this course was expanded to eighteen holes by VO “Red” Allen.

In 1965, Robert Trent Jones was brought to the resort to design and oversee the development of the properties’ second course, as well as redesign the first course built in the 30s. These courses were renamed the “Blue” and “Gold” courses.

The resort’s third course, the “Red Course,” was built in 1972.

The hotel's golf resort is the only 54-hole golf resort in the state of Arizona.
