= List of historic properties in Mesa, Arizona =

- Town
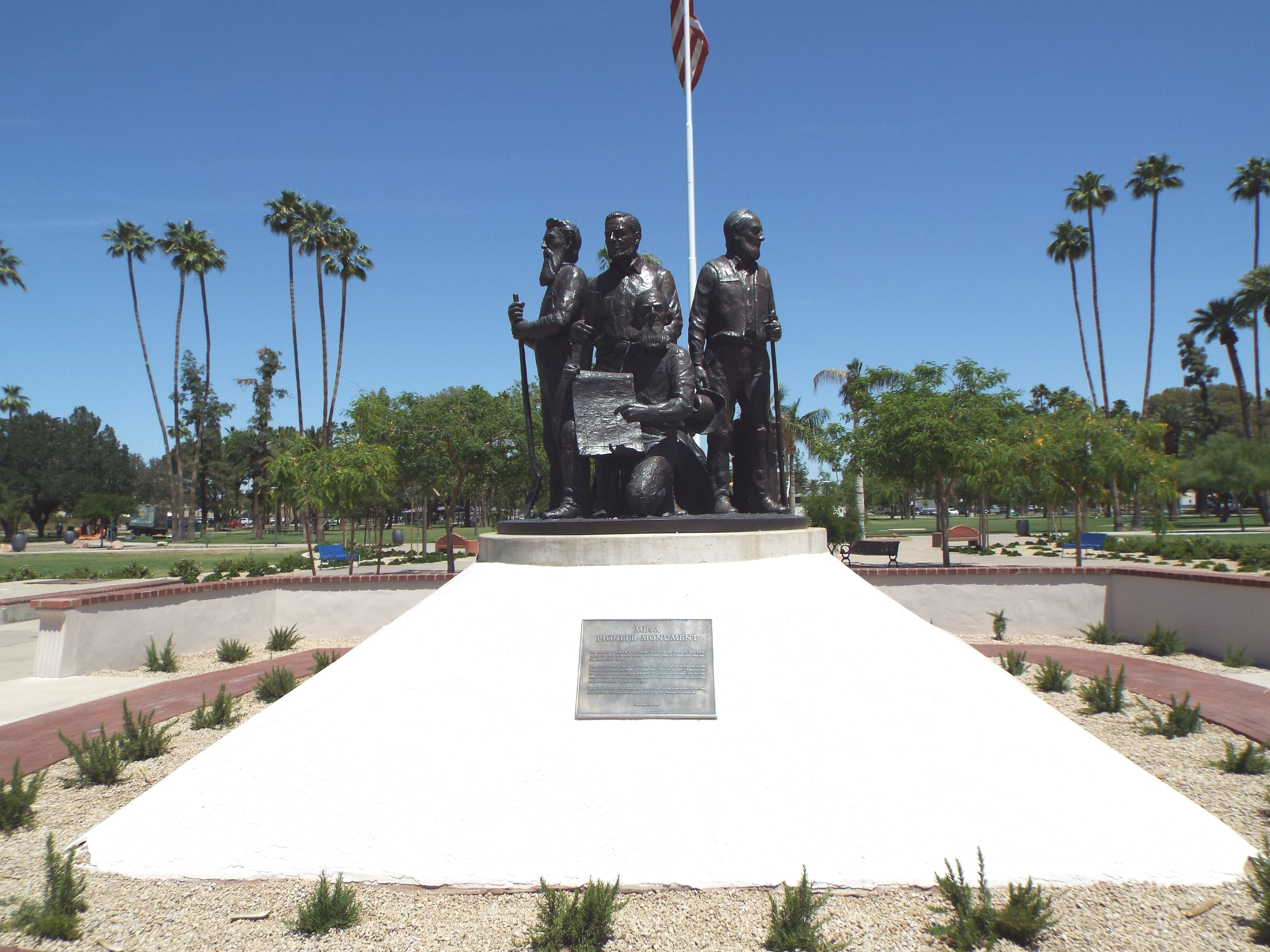
- Pioneer Park Monument

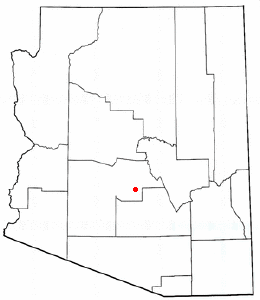
- Location in Maricopa County and the state of Arizona

This is a list, which includes a photographic gallery, of some of the remaining historic structures and monuments in Mesa, Arizona. Mesa is a city in Maricopa County located east of Phoenix. Mesa is the third largest city in Arizona, after Phoenix and Tucson.

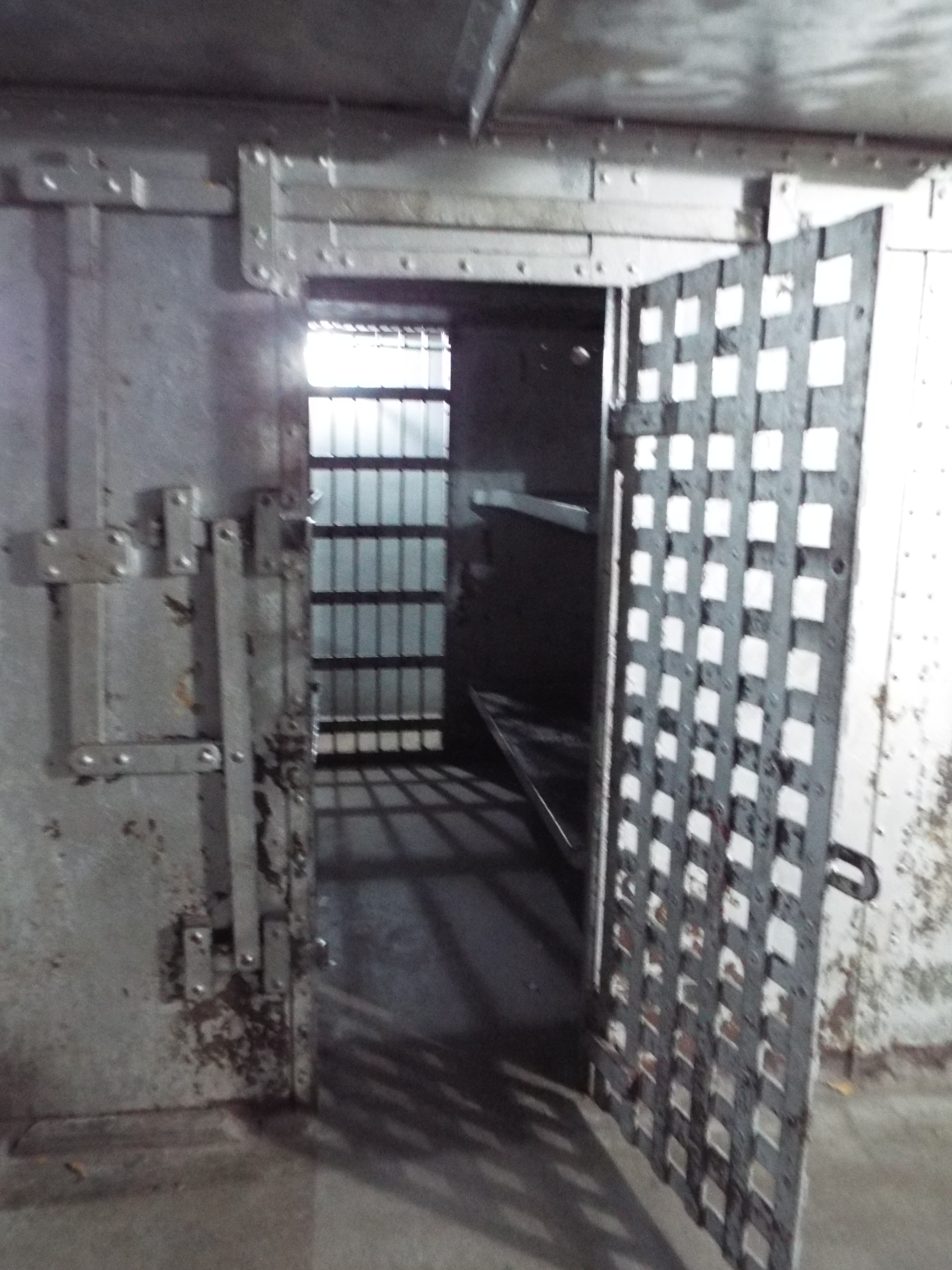
1884 Mesa Territorial Jail Cell

== Brief history ==
The early Mormon pioneers founded a settlement which they named Utahville. They soon renamed their settlement Lehi. They rebuilt the ancient canals that the Hohokam tribe had built, and the area became successful as an agricultural haven. On March 5, 1877, the pioneers built a fort using adobe bricks which they named "Fort Utah" to protect their families and fields from the Apaches who attacked them. In 1886, the town Post Office name was changed to Zenos. In 1889, the Post Office Department finally allowed the name Mesa City. There was a flood in Lehi in 1891, which destroyed Fort Utah and carried away acres of valuable farmland in low-lying areas.

There are numerous historical properties in Mesa which have either been listed in the National Register of Historic Places or on the list of the Mesa Historic Properties. The city's Mesa Historic Preservation Program facilitates public knowledge, understanding and appreciation of the city's historic past.

The city of Mesa cannot ultimately prevent private owners of the properties from demolishing them. Before a structure in a historic district or landmark can be demolished it must receive approval from the Historic Preservation Officer. A permit of demolition will be provided if the property represents an immediate hazard. Other requests will be held for a period of six months, during which the Historic Preservation Officer will look for possible reasons to save the structure. The structure may be demolished if by the end of the six months no plan to save the structure has been established

Included in this list are the historic properties located in what once was Williams Air Force Base. The base was formerly a training base for the United States Army Air Forces, which later became the United States Air Force. The base closed in 1993. Part of the base was annexed by Mesa and part by the city of Phoenix. The area in which the base was located has been converted into a civilian airport called the Phoenix-Mesa Gateway Airport and an educational campus anchored by the Arizona State University and Chandler-Gilbert Community College. On May 19, 2016, the "Falcon Field World War II Aviation Hangars" were listed in the National Register of Historic Places,

Images of some of these properties with a short description follow:

== Old Fort Utah ==
- Fort Utah – built in 1877. the remains of the old fort are located at 2331 N Horne Rd. The fort was a pioneer post established in 1877, by the Mormon Lehi Pioneers in present-day Mesa.It is known as Old Fort Utah. A flood in Lehi in 1891, destroyed Fort Utah and carried away acres of valuable farmland in low-lying areas.
- The 1884 Lehi School Bell
Old Fort Utah

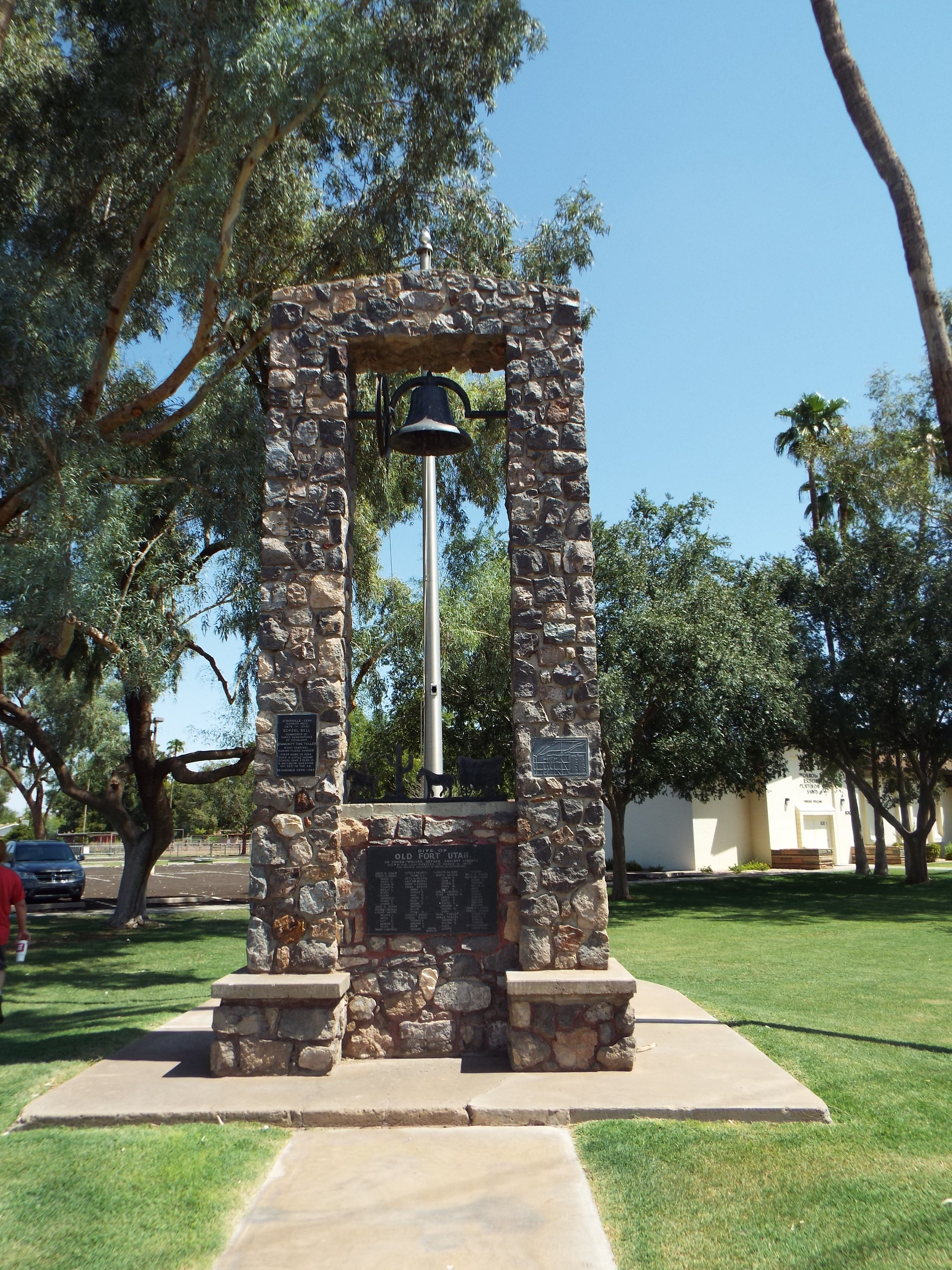
Old Fort Utah

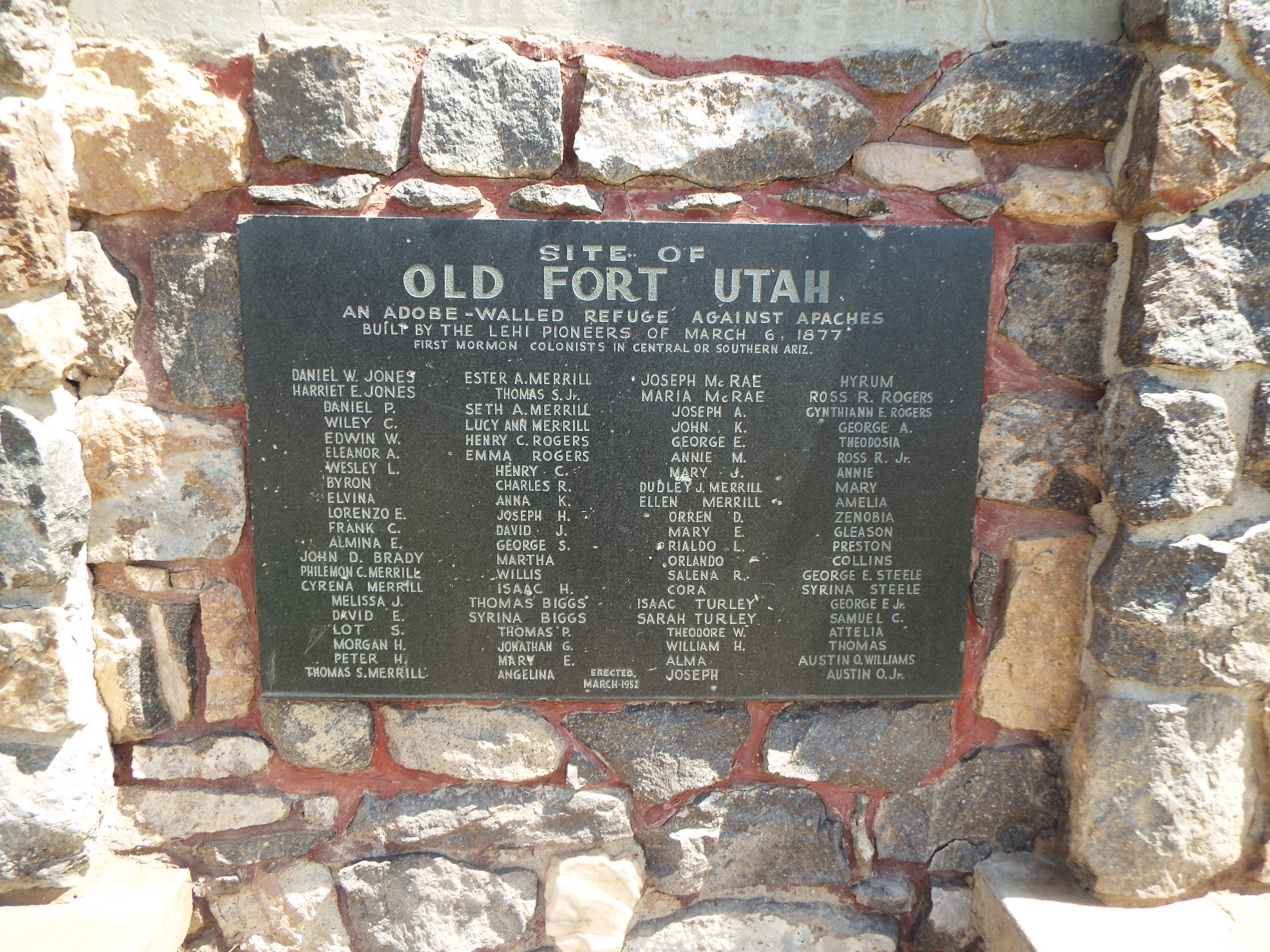
Old Fort Utah marker

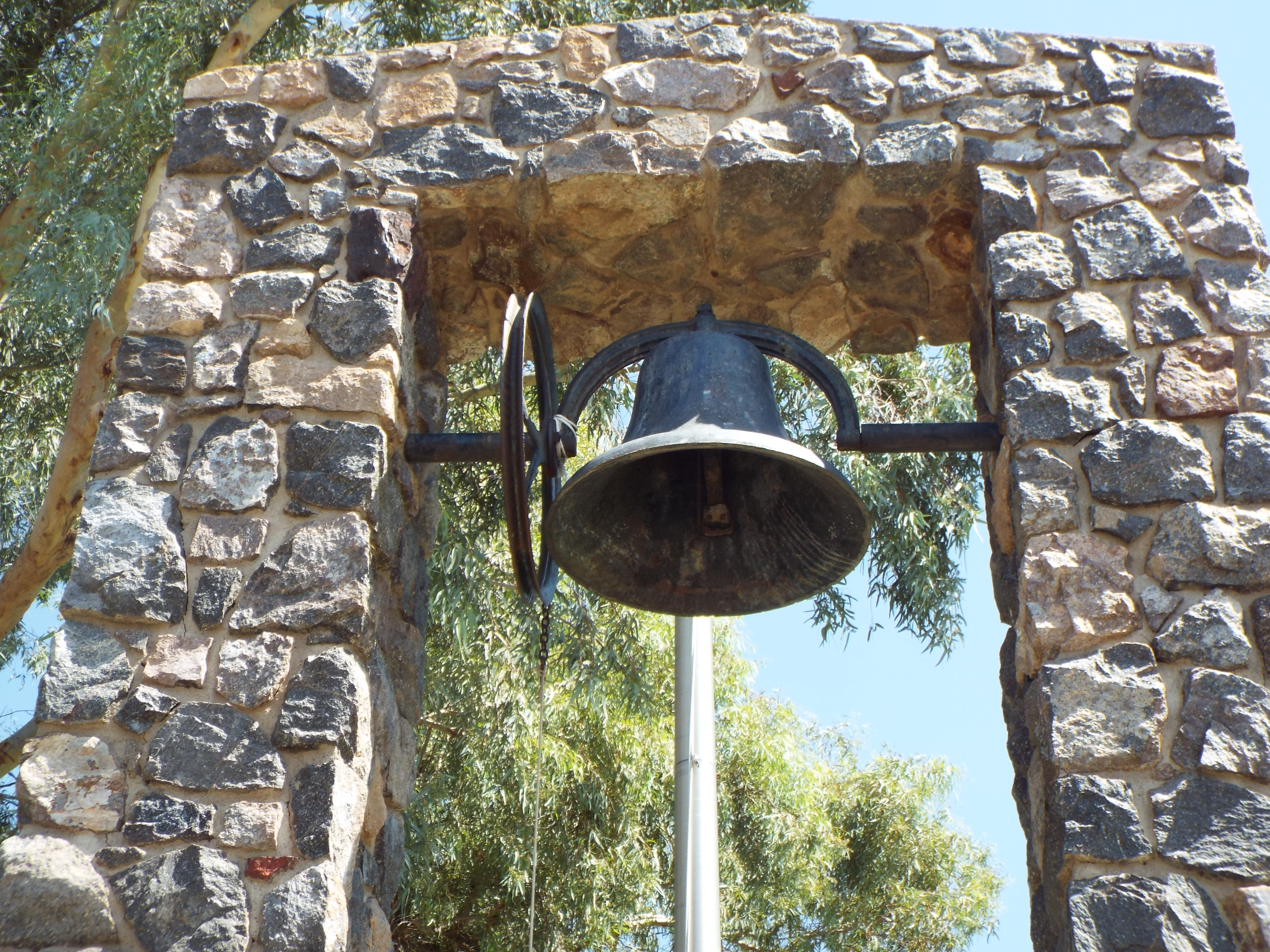
1884 Lehi School Bell

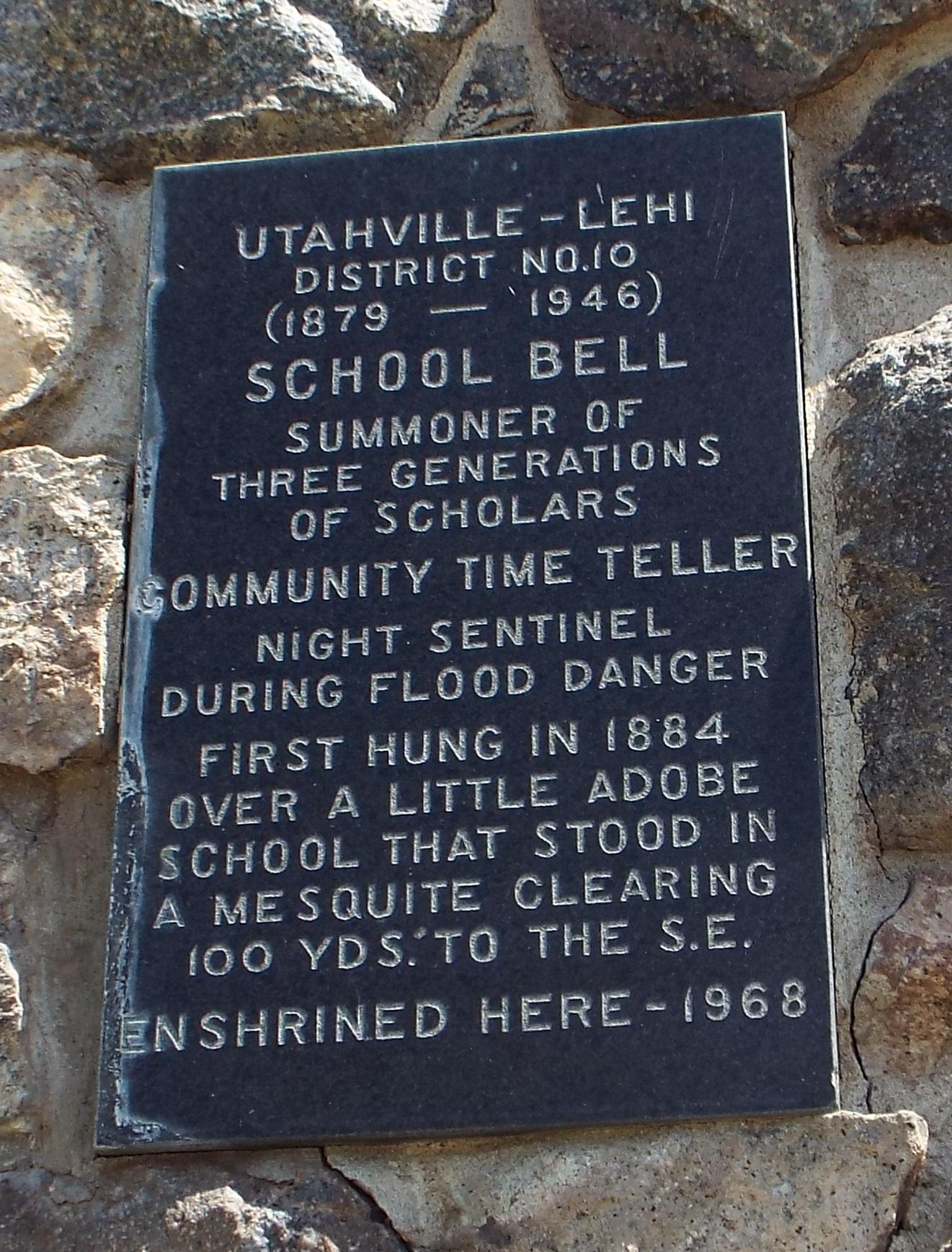
1884 Lehi School Bell marker

== Buildings ==
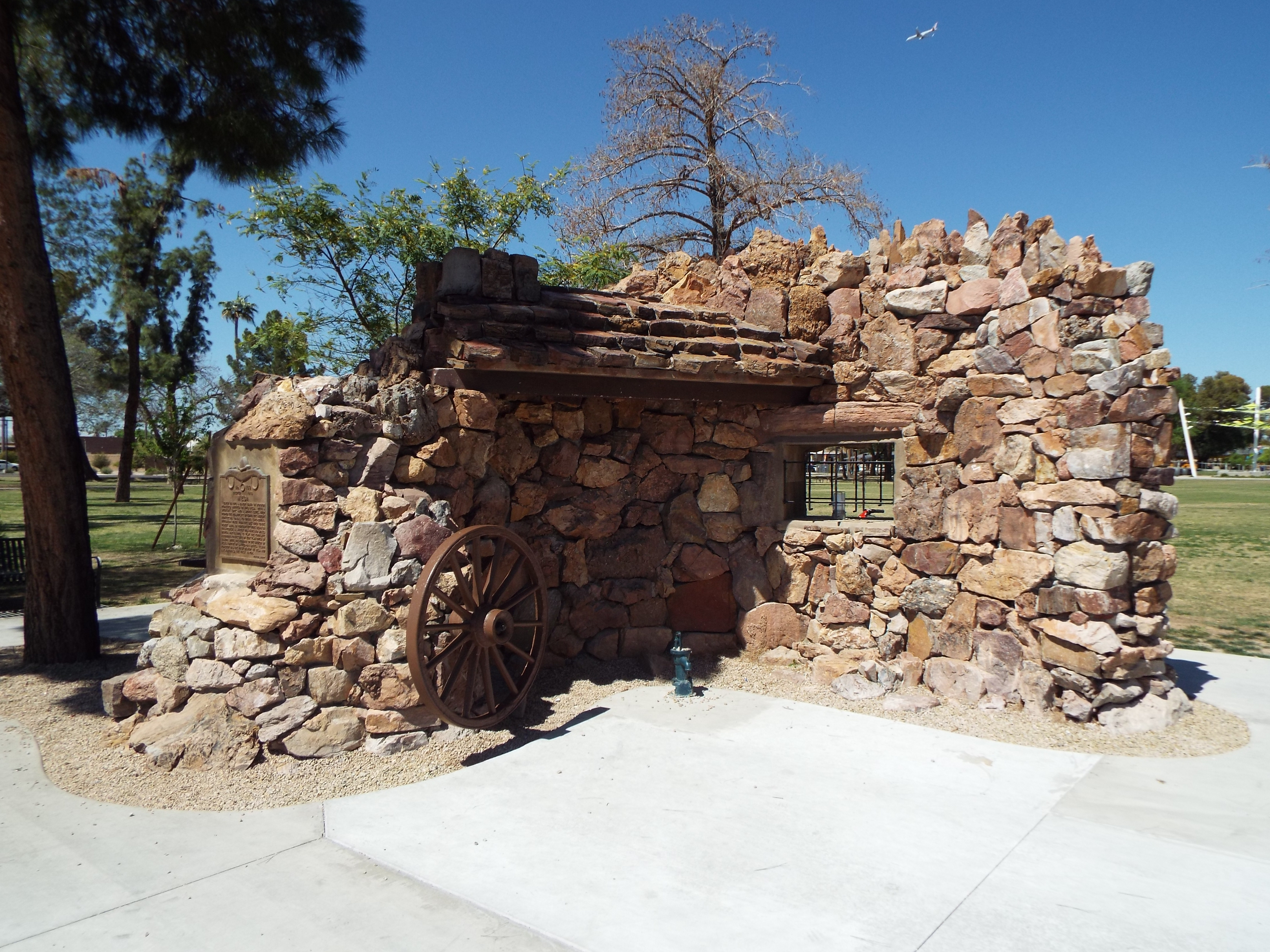
1878 Mormon Pioneer Ruins

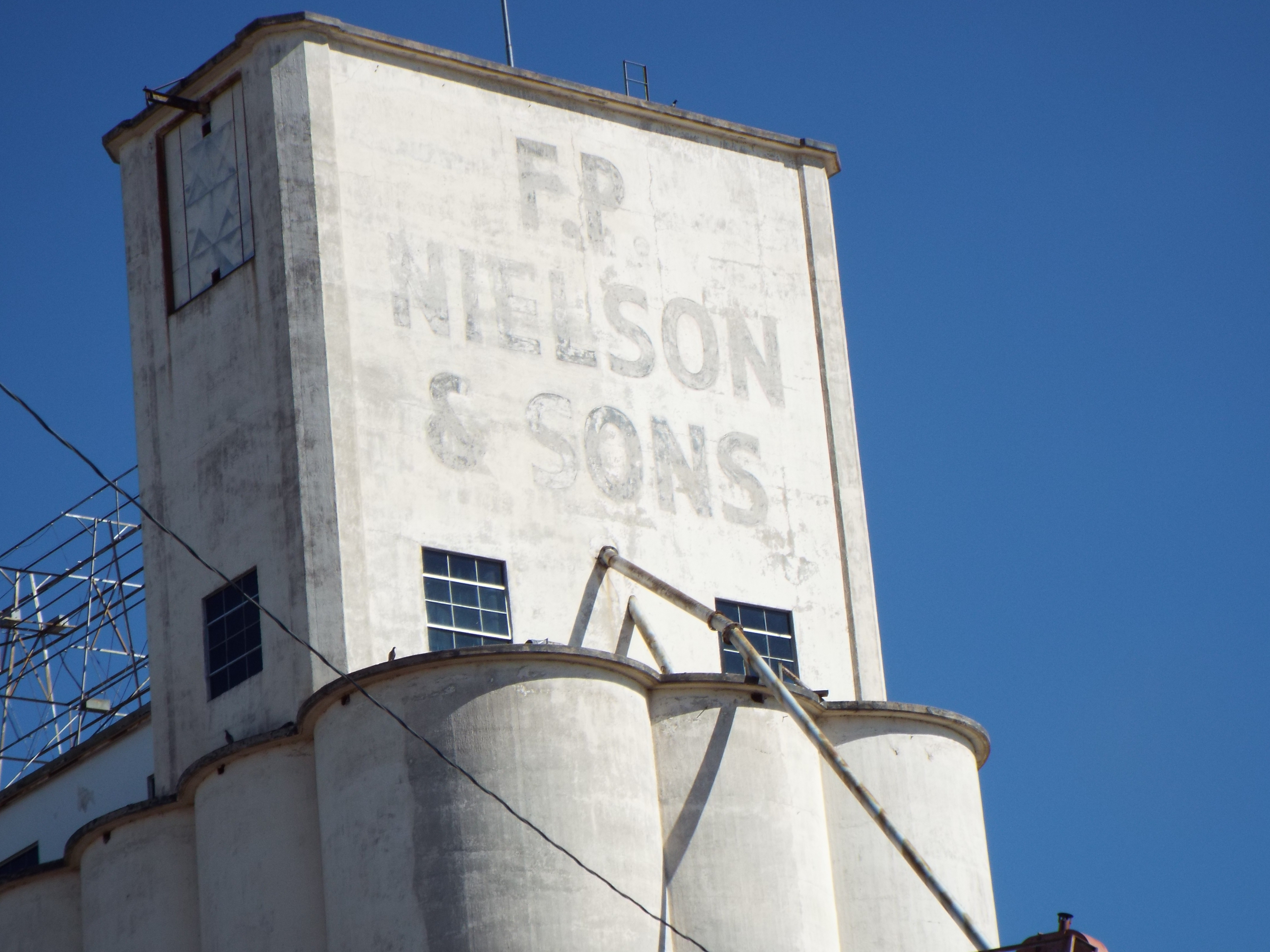
Grain Elevator Nielson & Sons sign

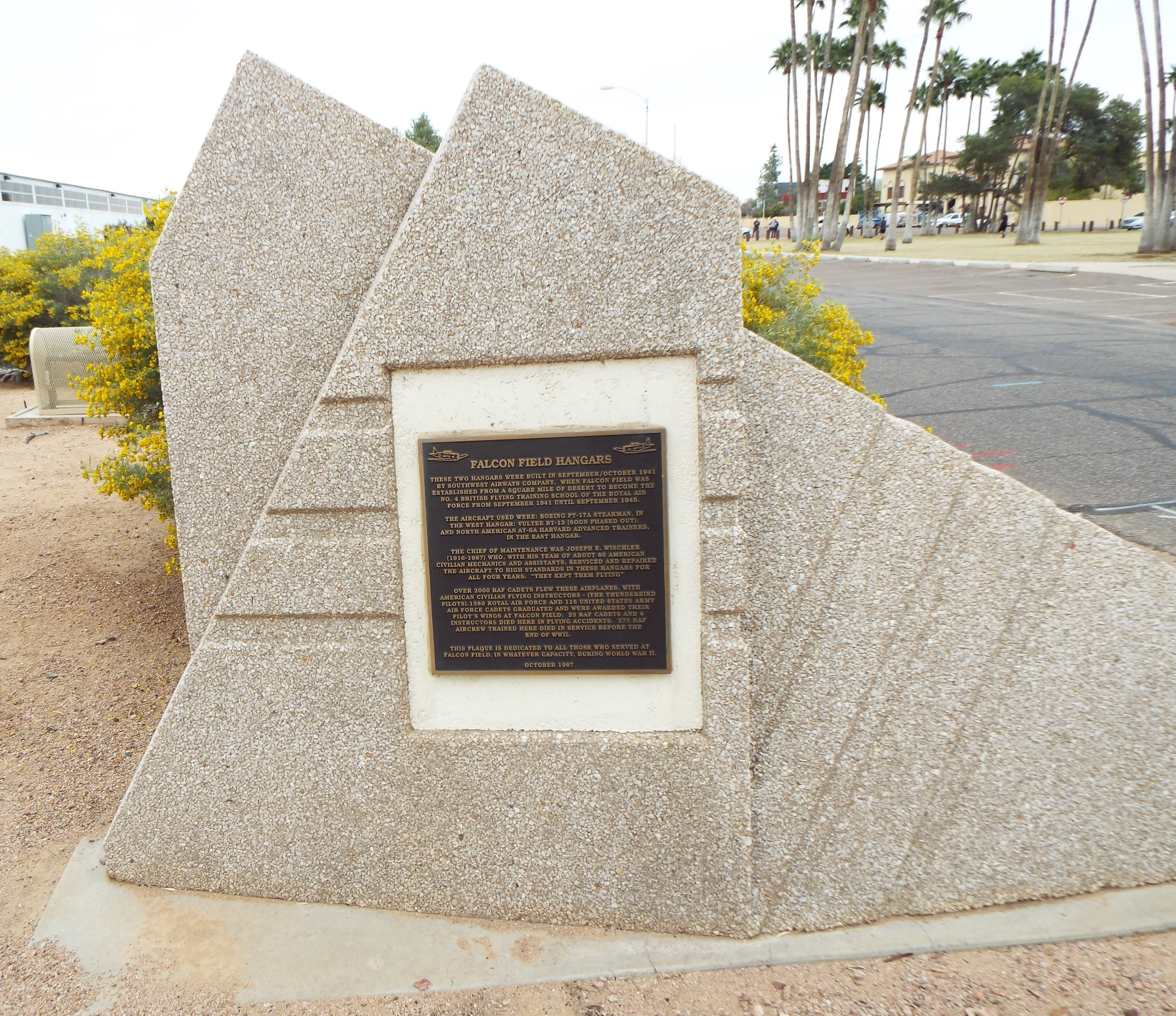
The Falcon Field World War II Aviation Hangars Plaque

The following buildings and houses of religious worship which are listed in the National Register of Historic Places and/or the Mesa Historic Properties are pictured in this section with a brief description of the same. The Arizona Museum of Natural History was actually built where the city hall, jail and courthouse were once located. The museum kept the 1884 Territorial jail cells and has them on display. Also, pictured is the 1926 Town Center Clock located at the NE corner of W. Main and Macdonald. This clock was originally across the street at 61 West Main but, was moved to this corner in 1932. The clock mechanism has been updated.

- The replica of the original Lehi School was built in 1880.
- The Pomeroy Building was built in 1891 by the sons of Francis Pomeroy, one of Mesa's founding fathers. It is located at 138 West Main St. This building housed one of the city's earliest businesses.
- The Alhambra Hotel which was originally built in 1893 and reconstructed in 1922. It was listed in the National Register of Historic Places on July 31, 1991.
- The Abell, Wilbur and Company Warehouse built in 1898 located at 166 W. Main Street.
- The Lehi School, built in 1913. Historic Significance: Architecture/Engineering, Event, Architect, builder, or engineer: WPA, Architectural Style: Moderne, Mission/Spanish Revival, Area of Significance: Architecture, Community Planning And Development, Entertainment/Recreation, Education. Period of Significance: 1950–1974, 1925–1949, 1900–1924.
- The Nile Theater Building located at 105 West Main Street opened in 1924, this was Mesa's first air-conditioned building. Blocks of ice were put in a container in the back of the building and a large fan behind the ice distributed the cool air to vents under the theater seats. The theater existed until 1951.
- The Mesa Women's Club, built in 1931 (NRHP) Historic Significance: Event, Area of Significance: Social History, Period of Significance: 1925–1949.
- Irving School was built in 1936 and it is located at 155 N. Center St. The Irving School is a rare surviving example of Federal Modern style architecture applied to an elementary school. The school was listed in the National Register of Historic Places on November 8, 2000, reference number 00001323.
- The Post Office/Federal Building, built in 1937, (MHP).
- The Buckhorn Baths Motel was built in 1939 and is located at 5900 Main St. in Mesa. The Buckhorn Baths Motel is a complex consisting of fourteen buildings including a bathhouse, a main office building, and individual room units. The motel was listed in the National Register of Historic Places on May 10, 2005, reference number #05000421.
- The Grain Elevator Frihoff Peter Nielson & Sons built the 100-foot-tall Flour Mill, Grain Silo and Grain Elevator, the largest of its kind in the Valley, in 1938. It is located on the corner of Macdonald and Broadway Road.
- The Citrus Growers Warehouse built in 1930 and located at 254 Broadway Road.
- Individual room units of The Buckhorn Baths Motel .
- The Information Technology Department Building was built in 1959 and is located at 59 E. 1st St. It was built as the Mesa Public Library, it is an early example of post-World War II modern formalism architecture. It is listed in the Mesa Historic Property Register.
- The two Falcon Field World War II Aviation Hangars built in 1941 and located within 4800 E. Falcon Dr. The hangars were listed in the National Register of Historic Places on May 19, 2016, reference #16000266.
Historic Buildings

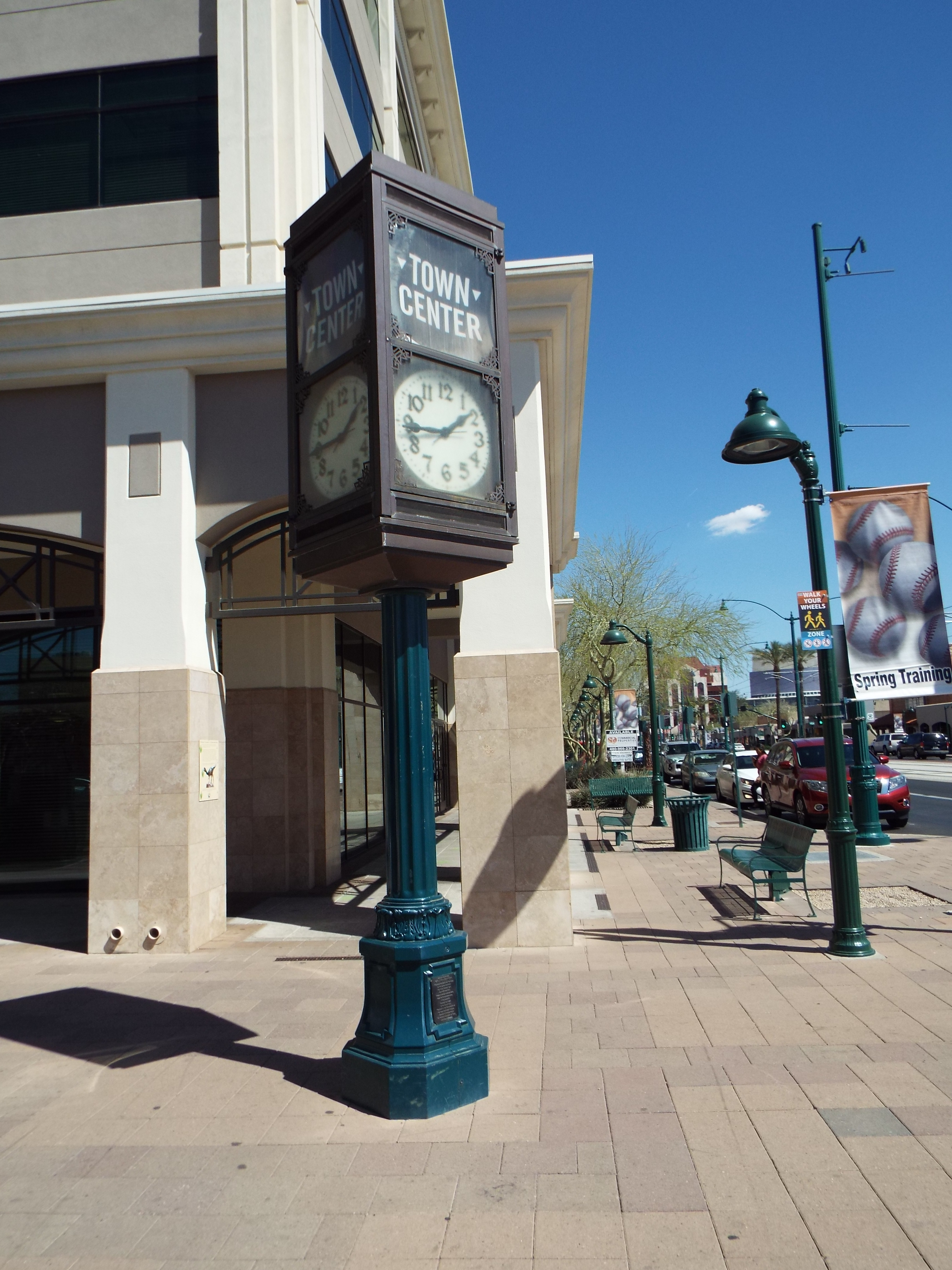
1926 Town Center Clock

(NRHP = National Register of Historic Places)
(MHP = Mesa Historic Properties)
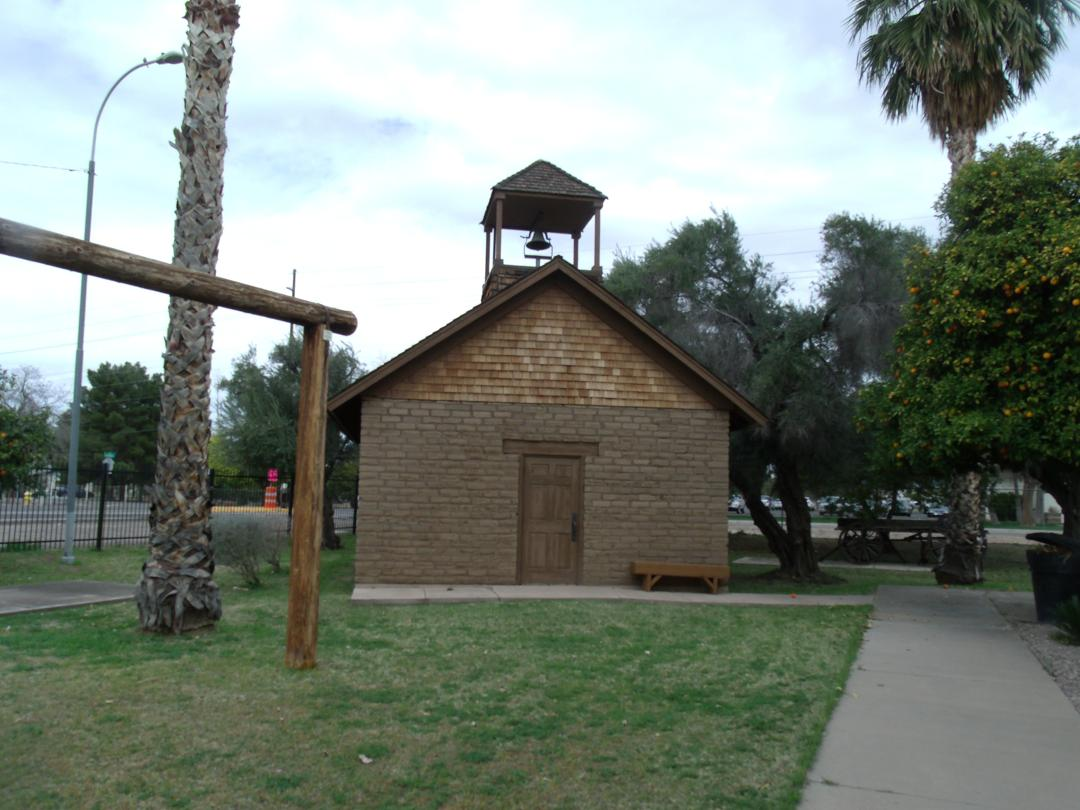
Lehi School (1880).

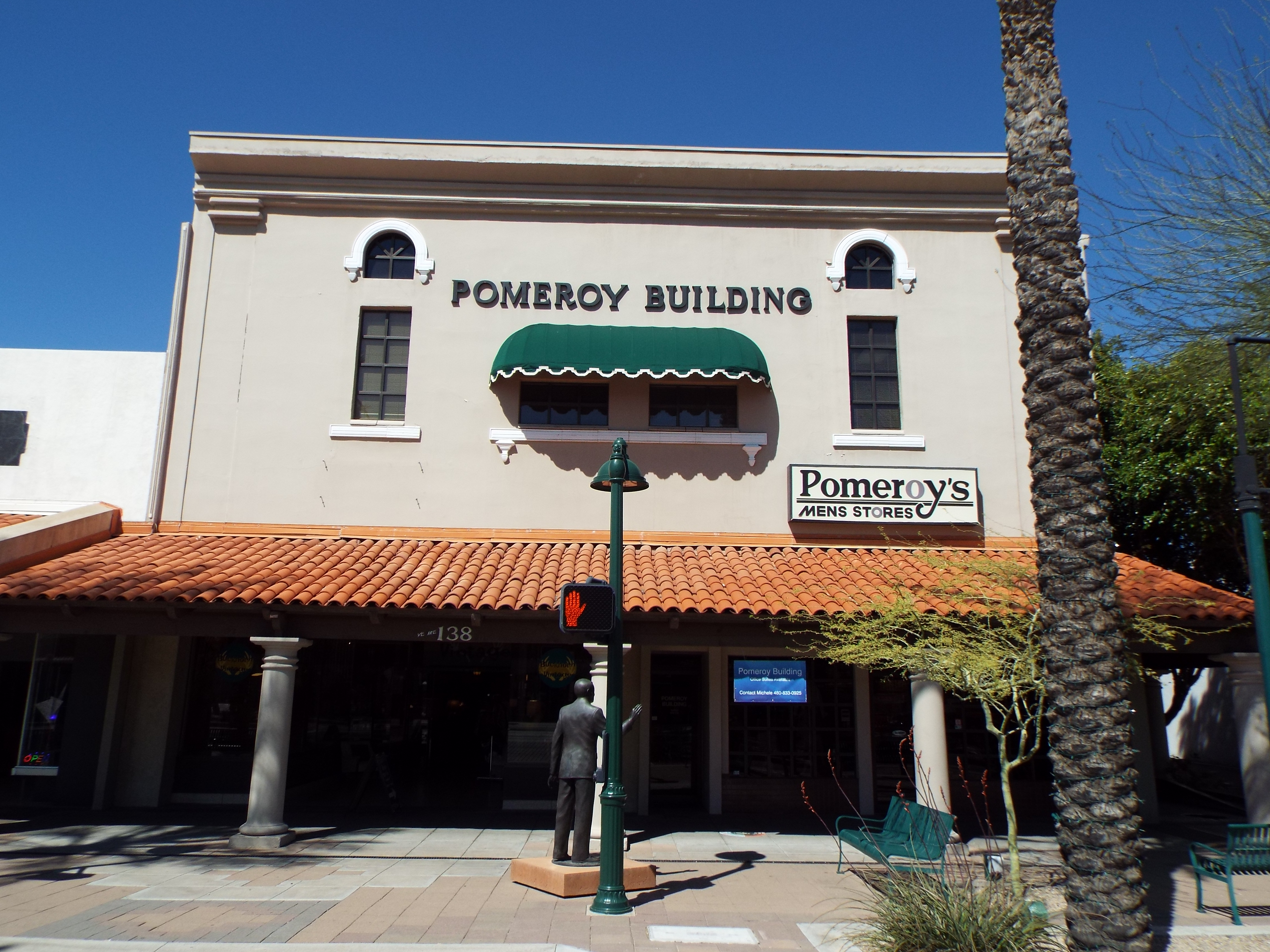
Pomeroy Building (1891)

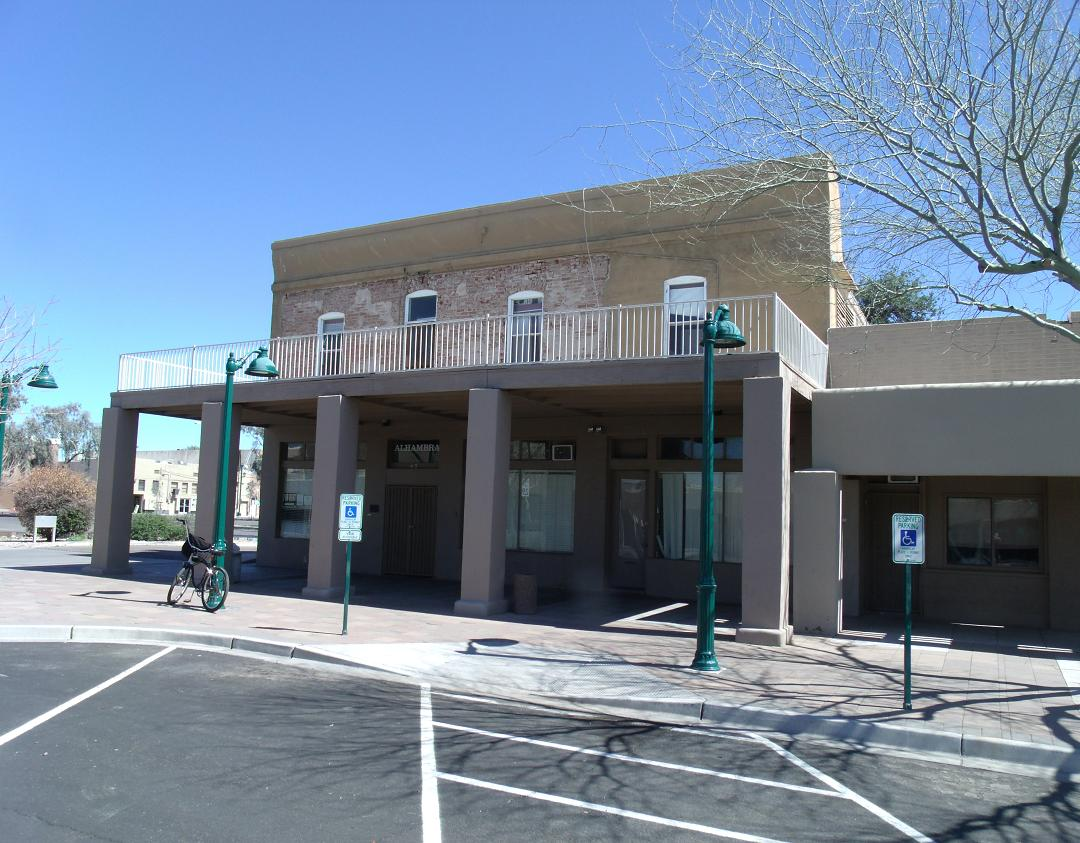
The Alhambra Hotel (1893).

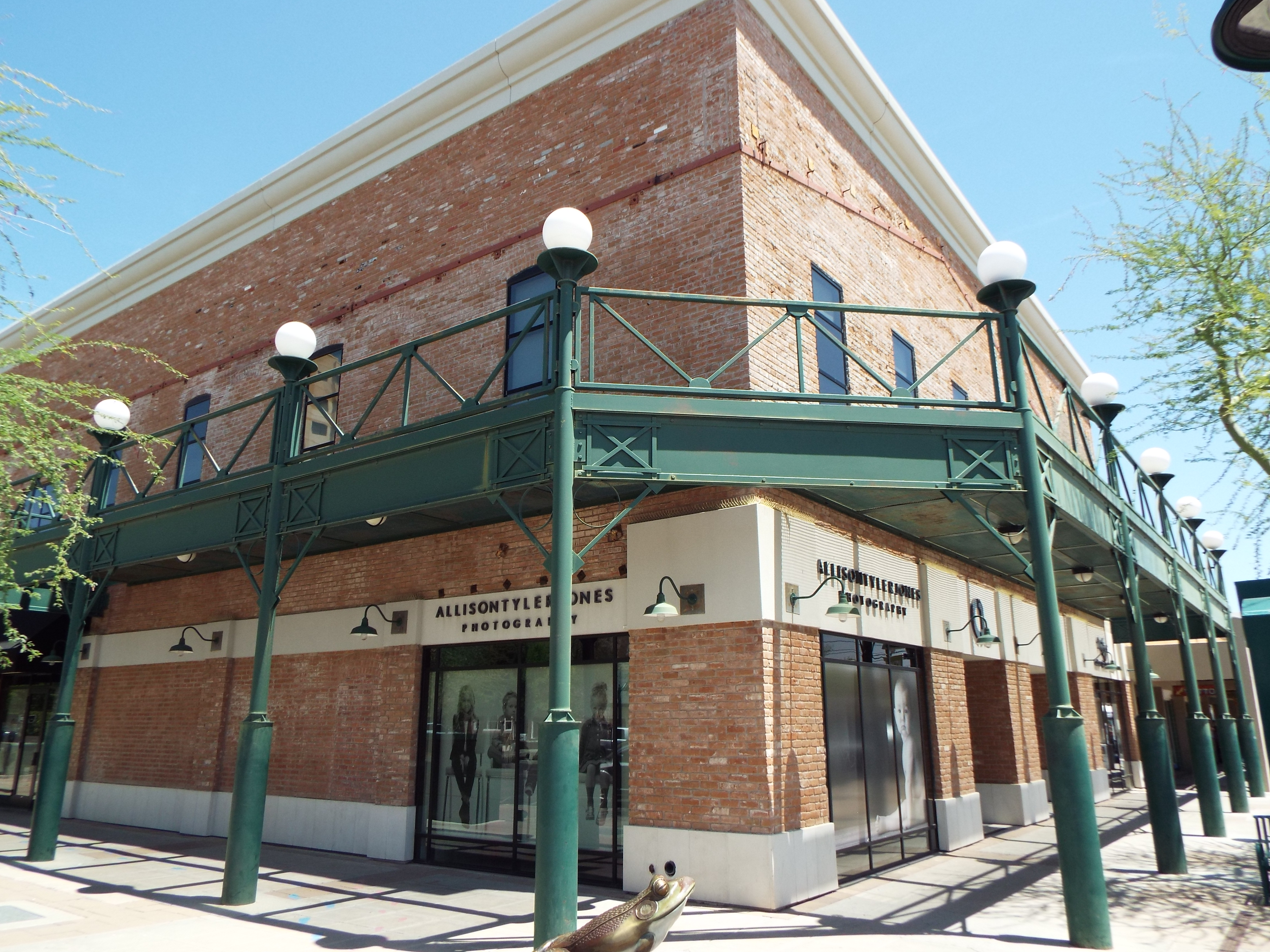
Abell, Wilbur and Company Warehouse (1898)

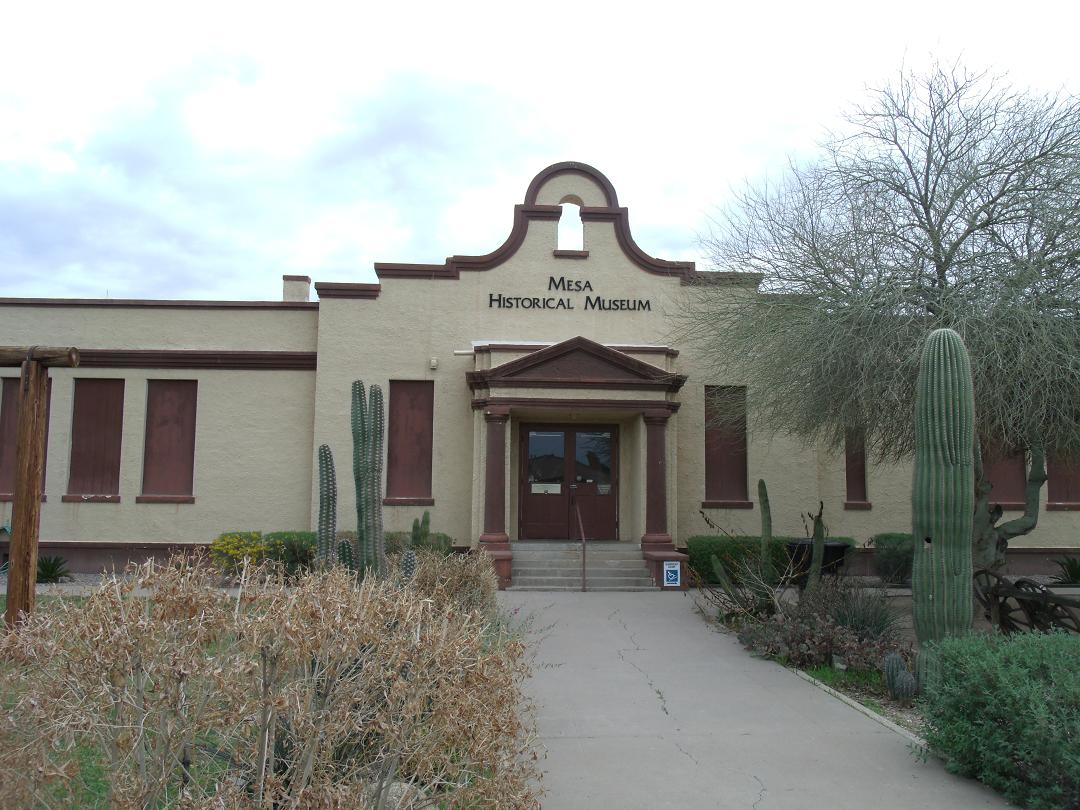
Lehi School (1913).

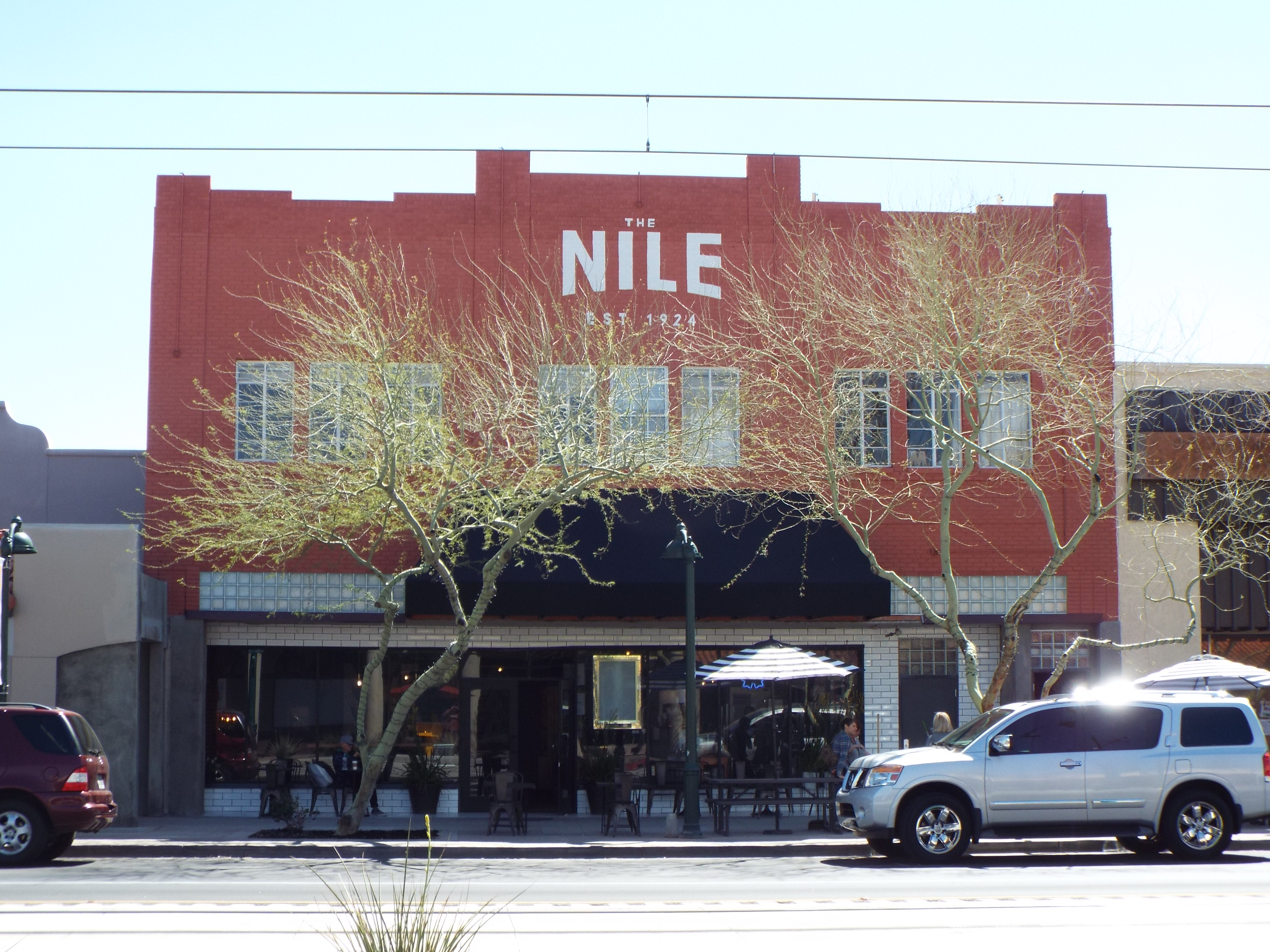
The Nile Theater (1924).

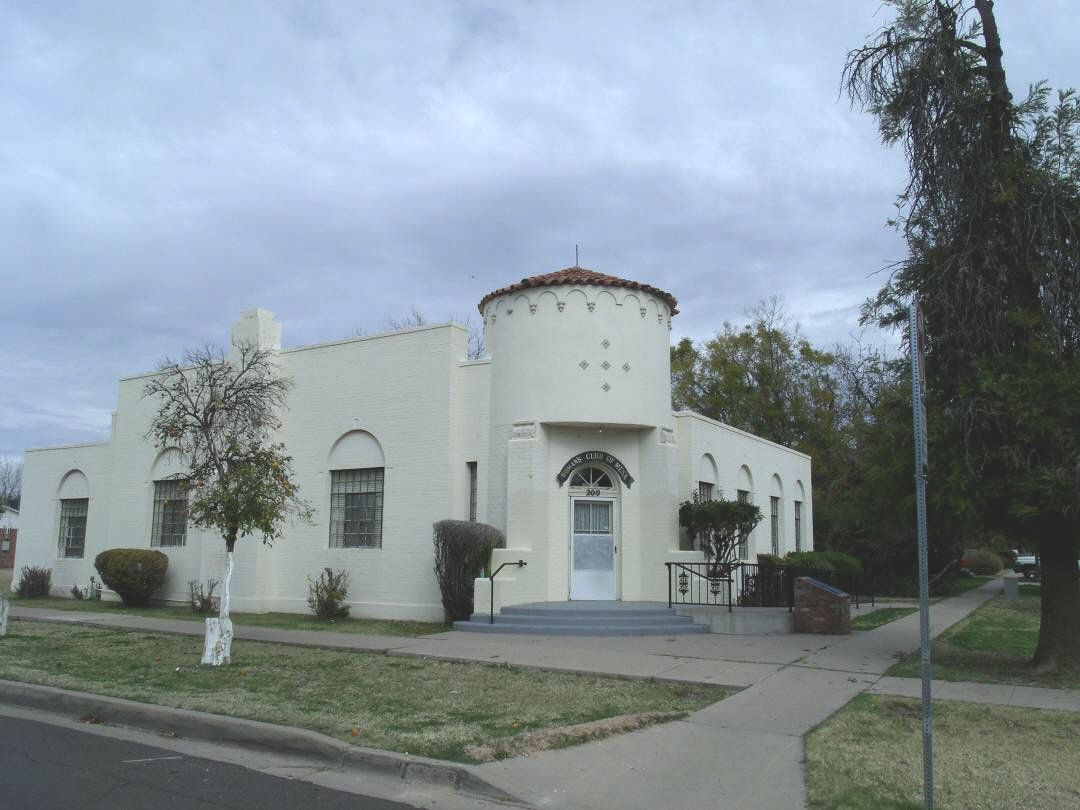
The Mesa Women's Club (1931).

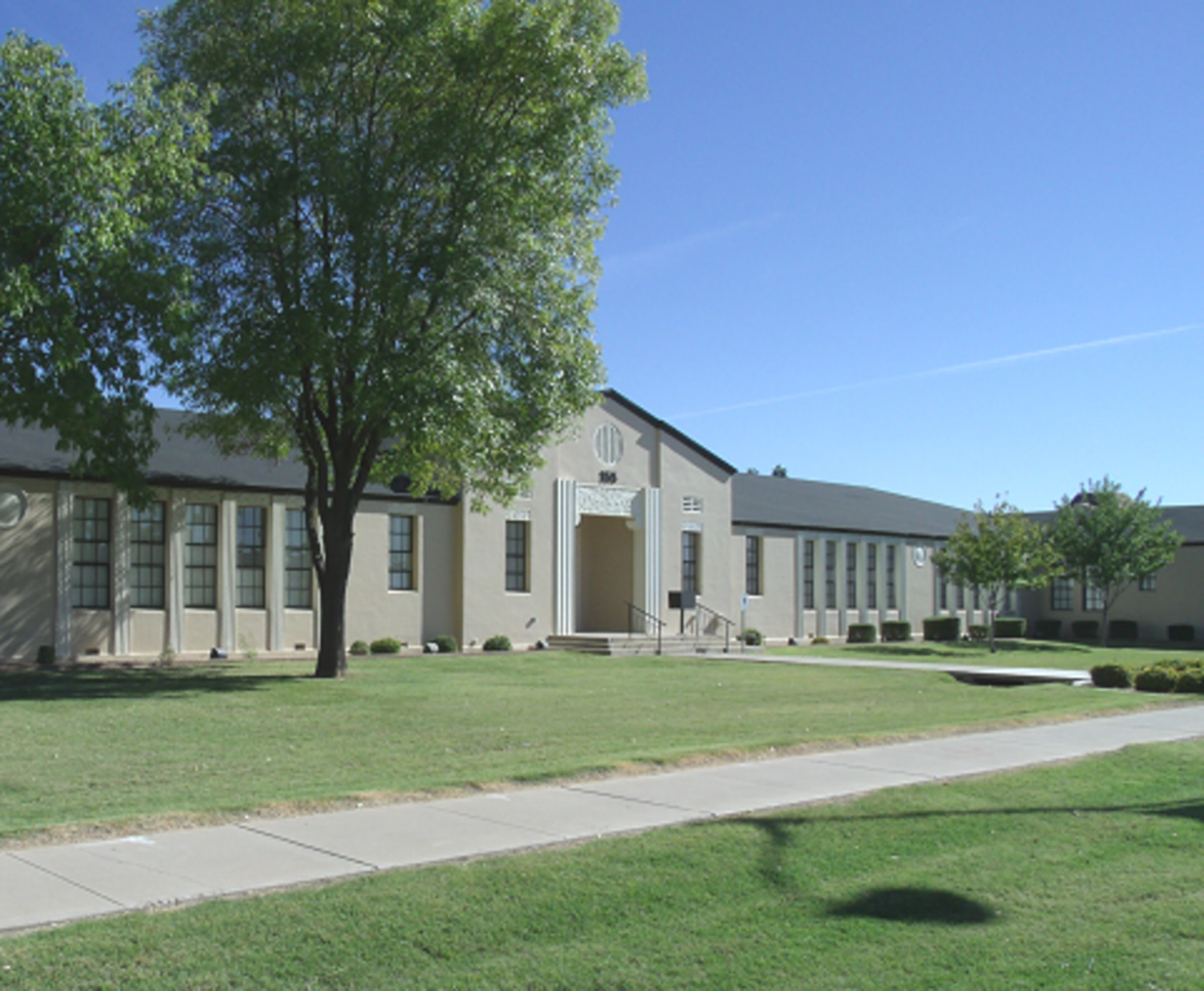
Irving School (1936).

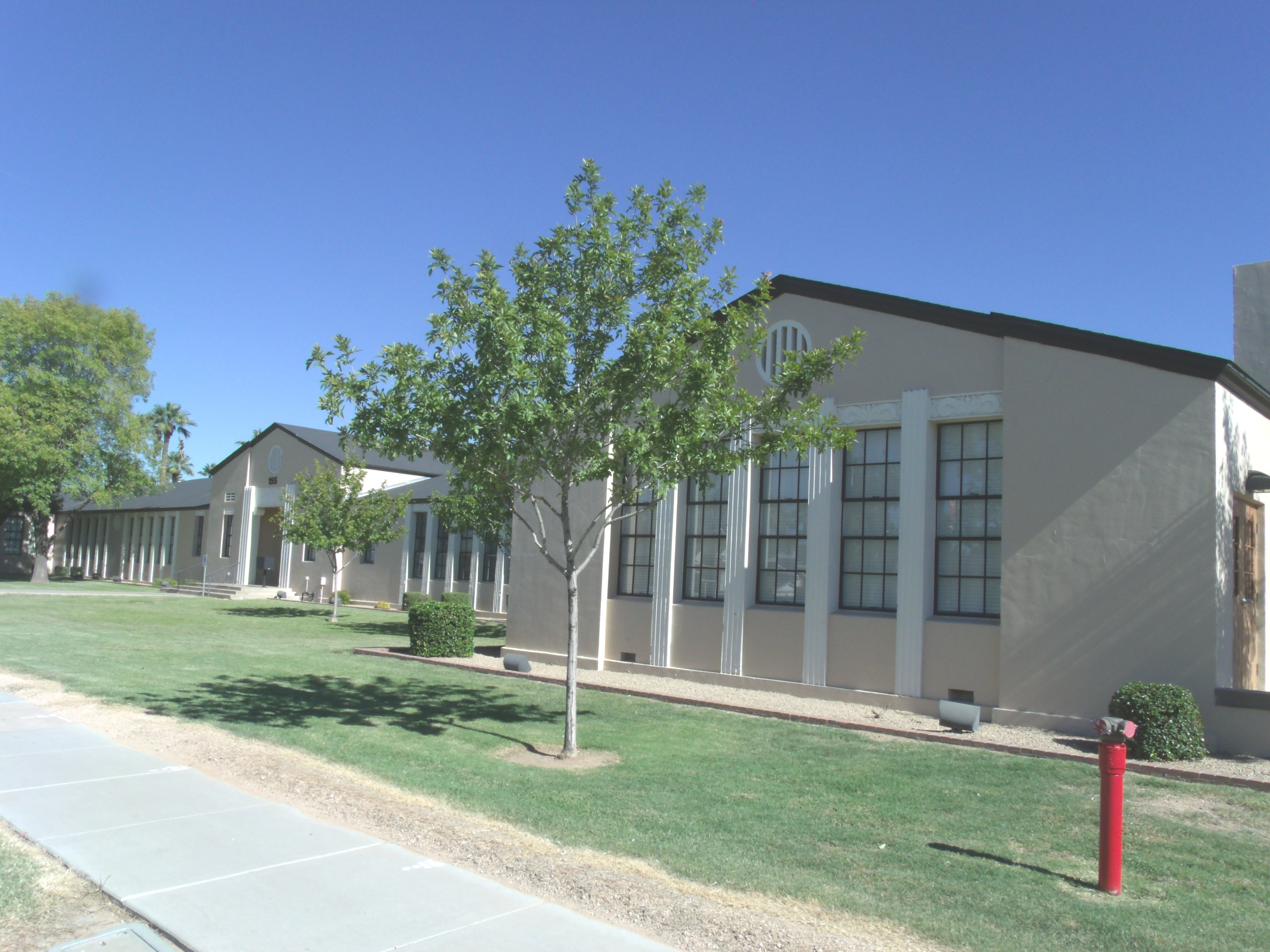
Different view of the Irving School (1936).

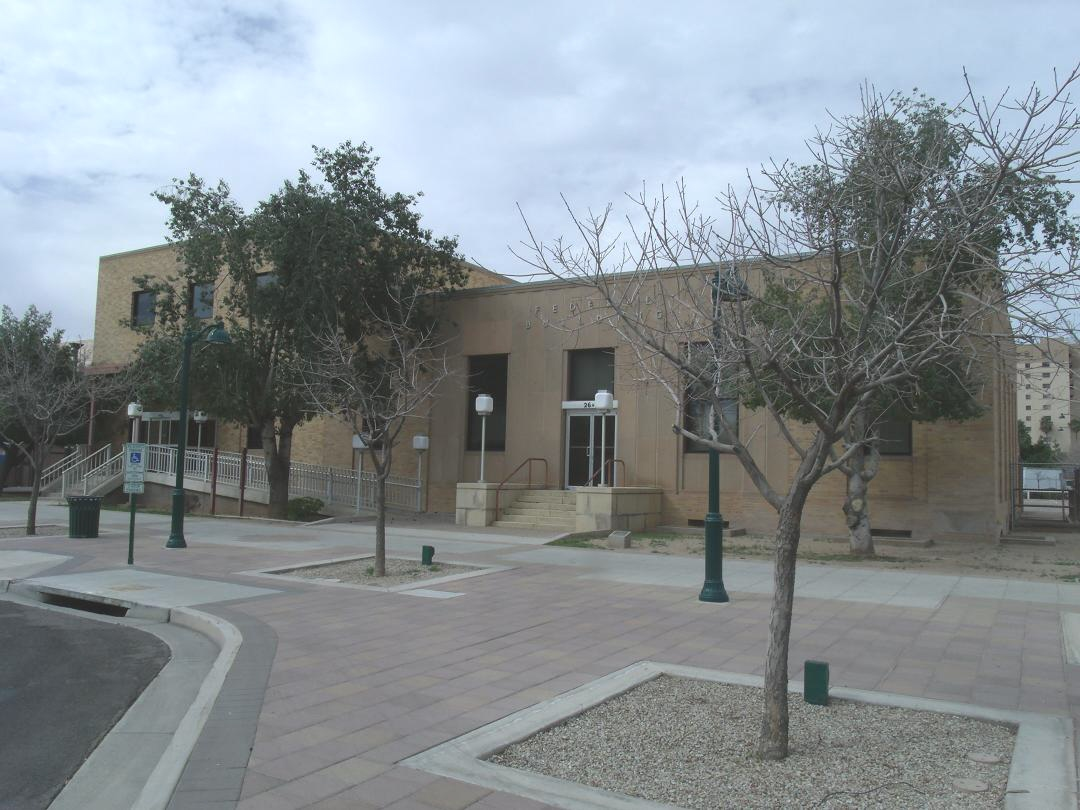
Post Office/Federal Building(1937).

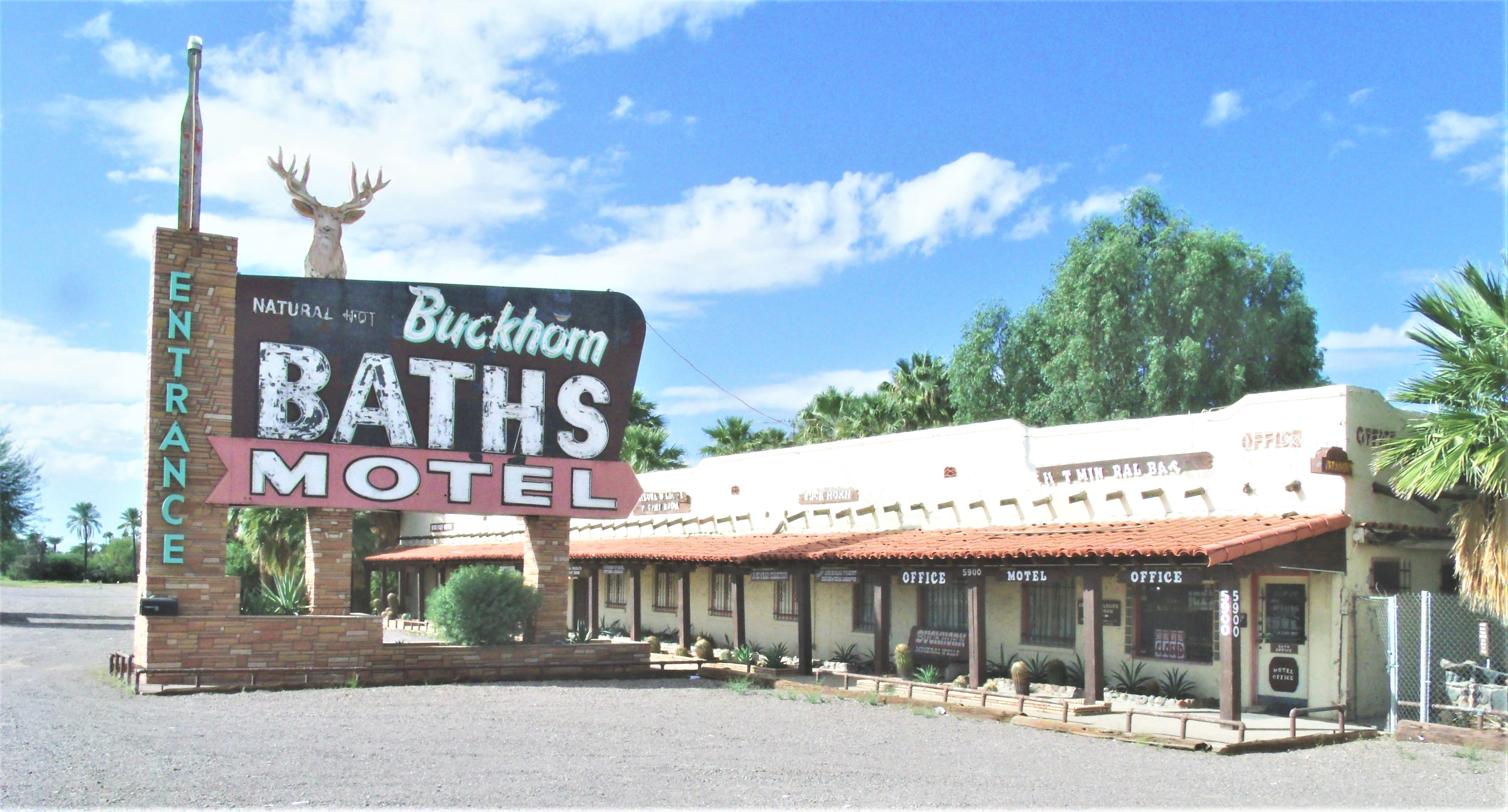
The Buckhorn Baths Motel (1939).

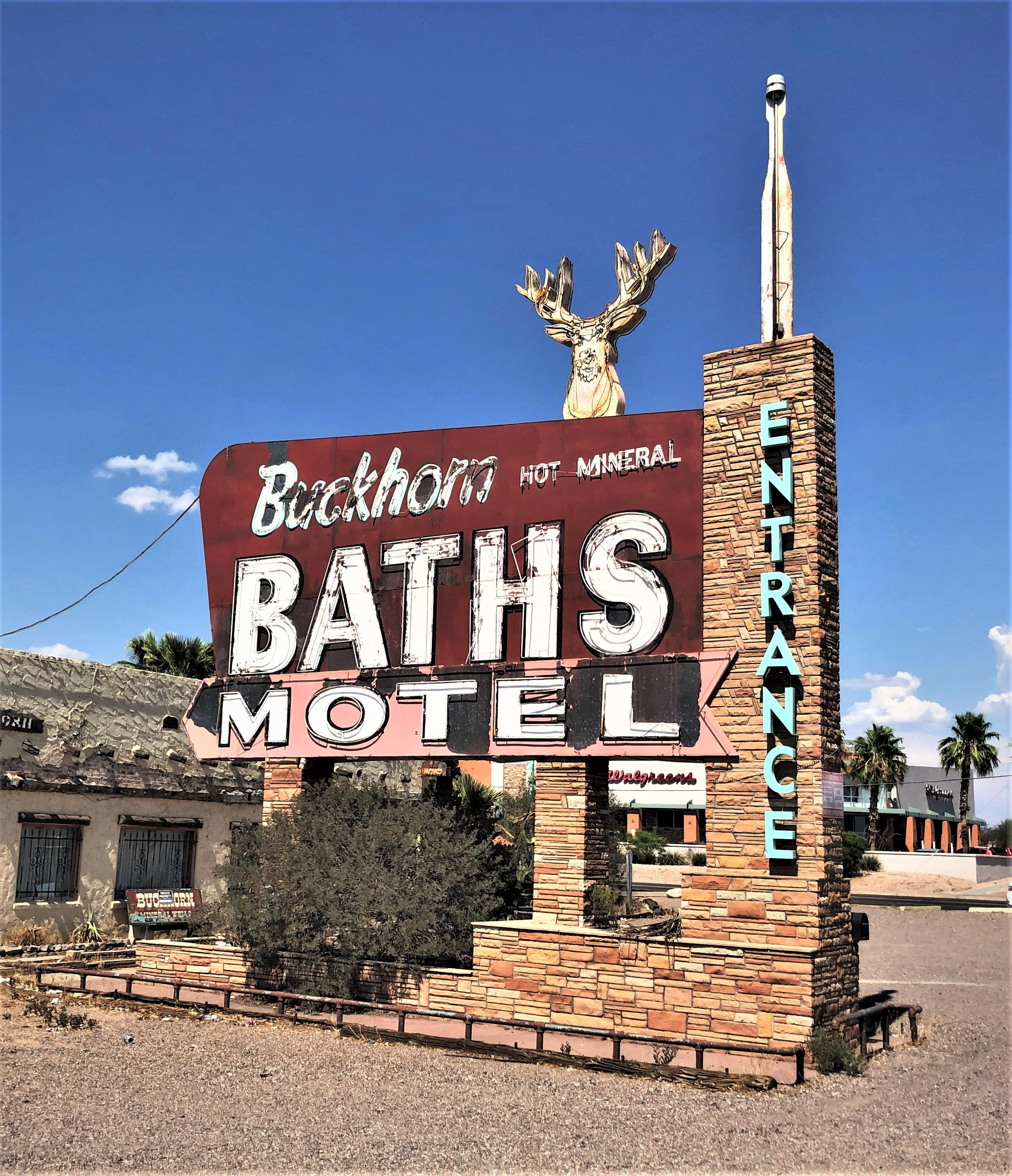
Buckhorn Baths Motel vintage sign

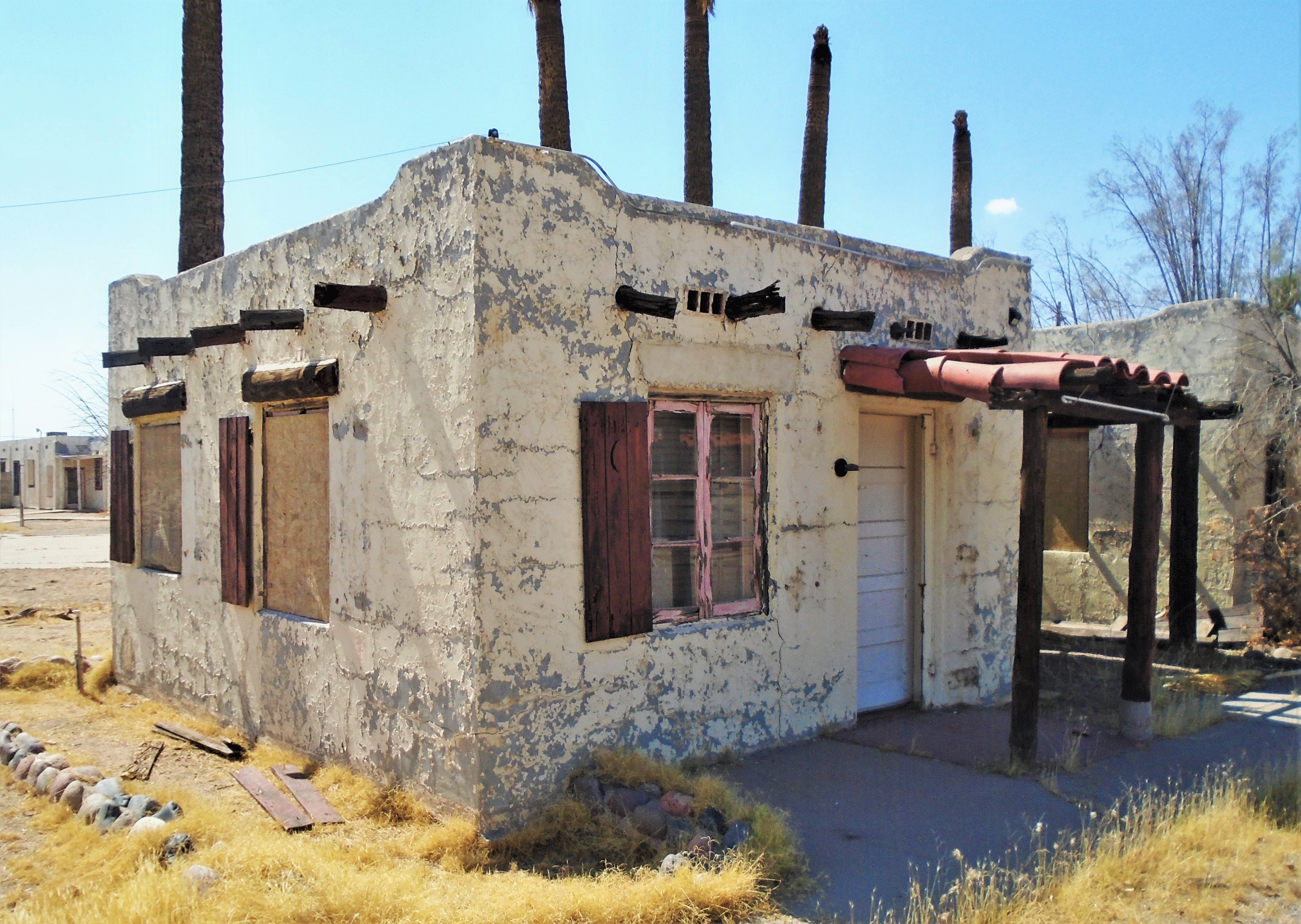
One of the cottages of The Buckhorn Baths Motel (1939).

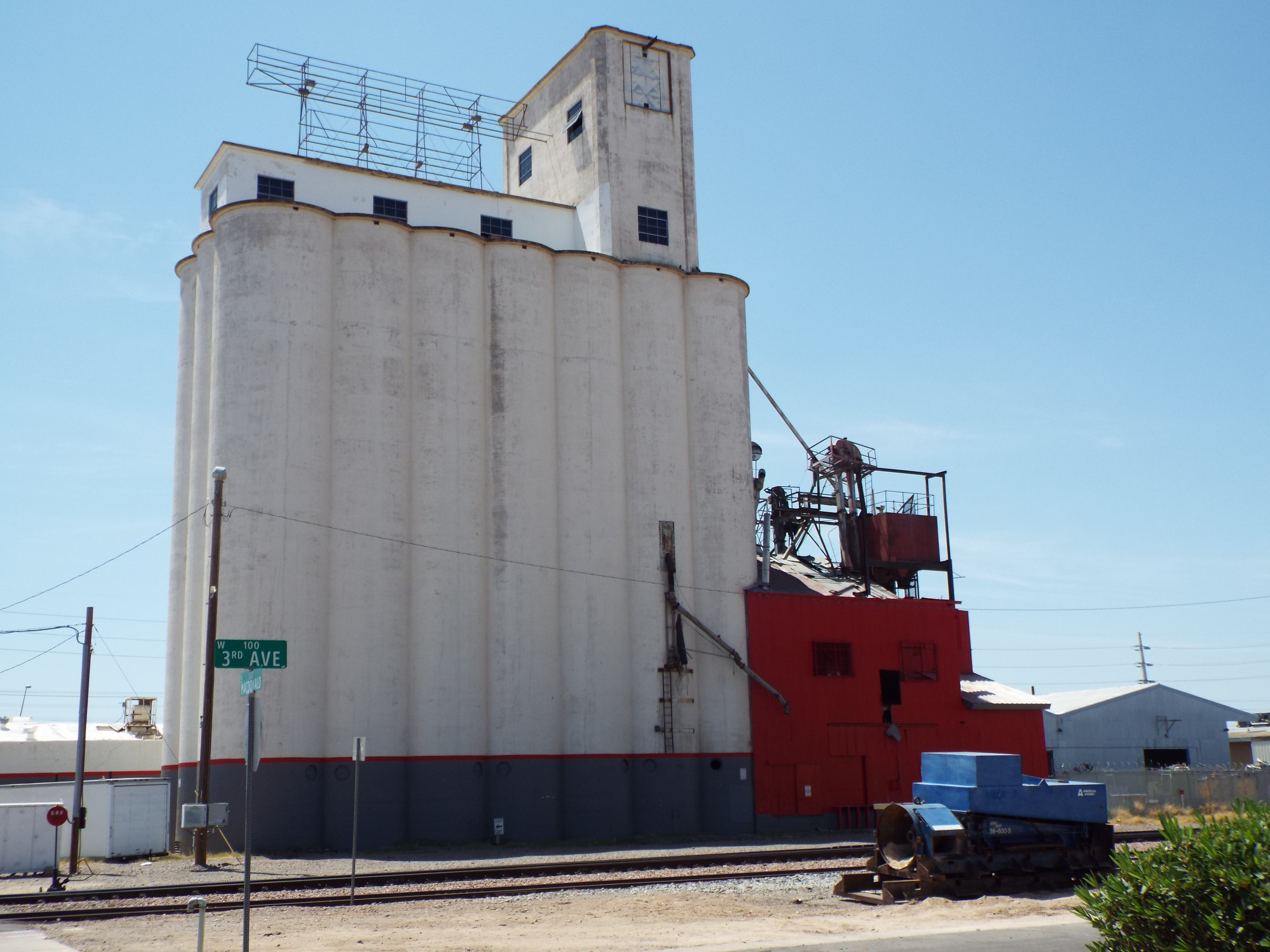
Grain Elevator (1938)

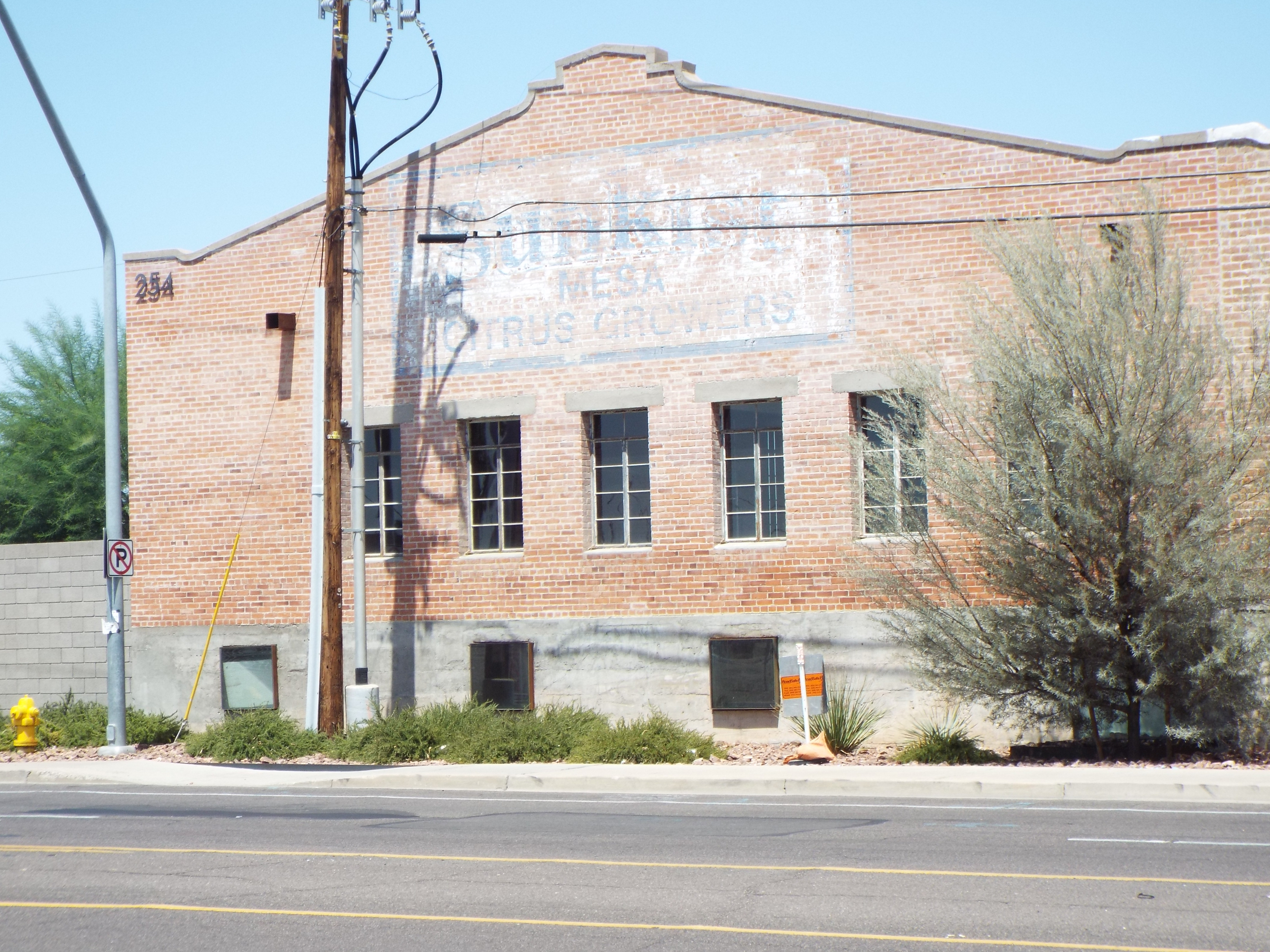
Citrus Growers Warehouse (1930)

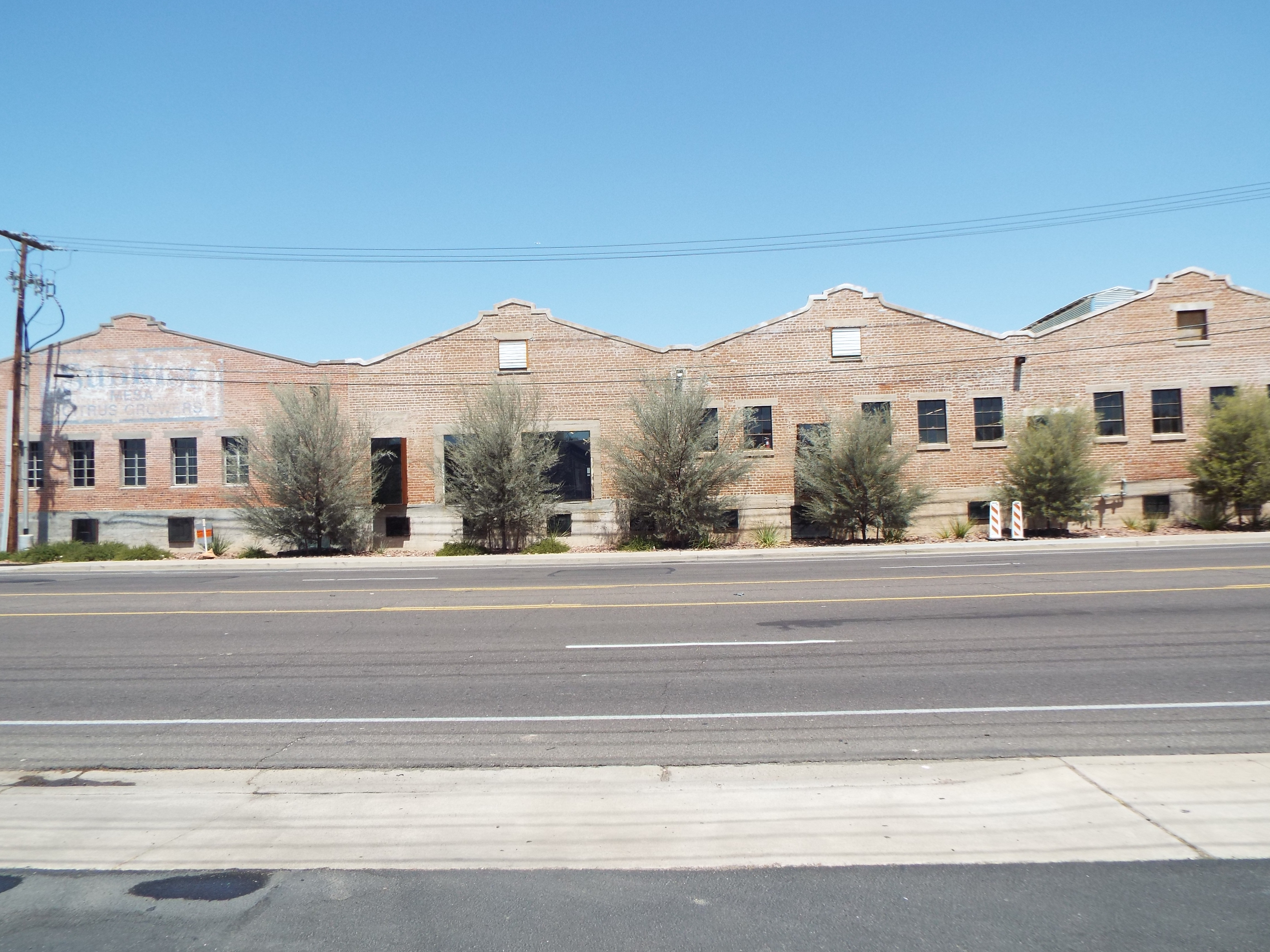
Full view of the Citrus Growers Warehouse (1930)

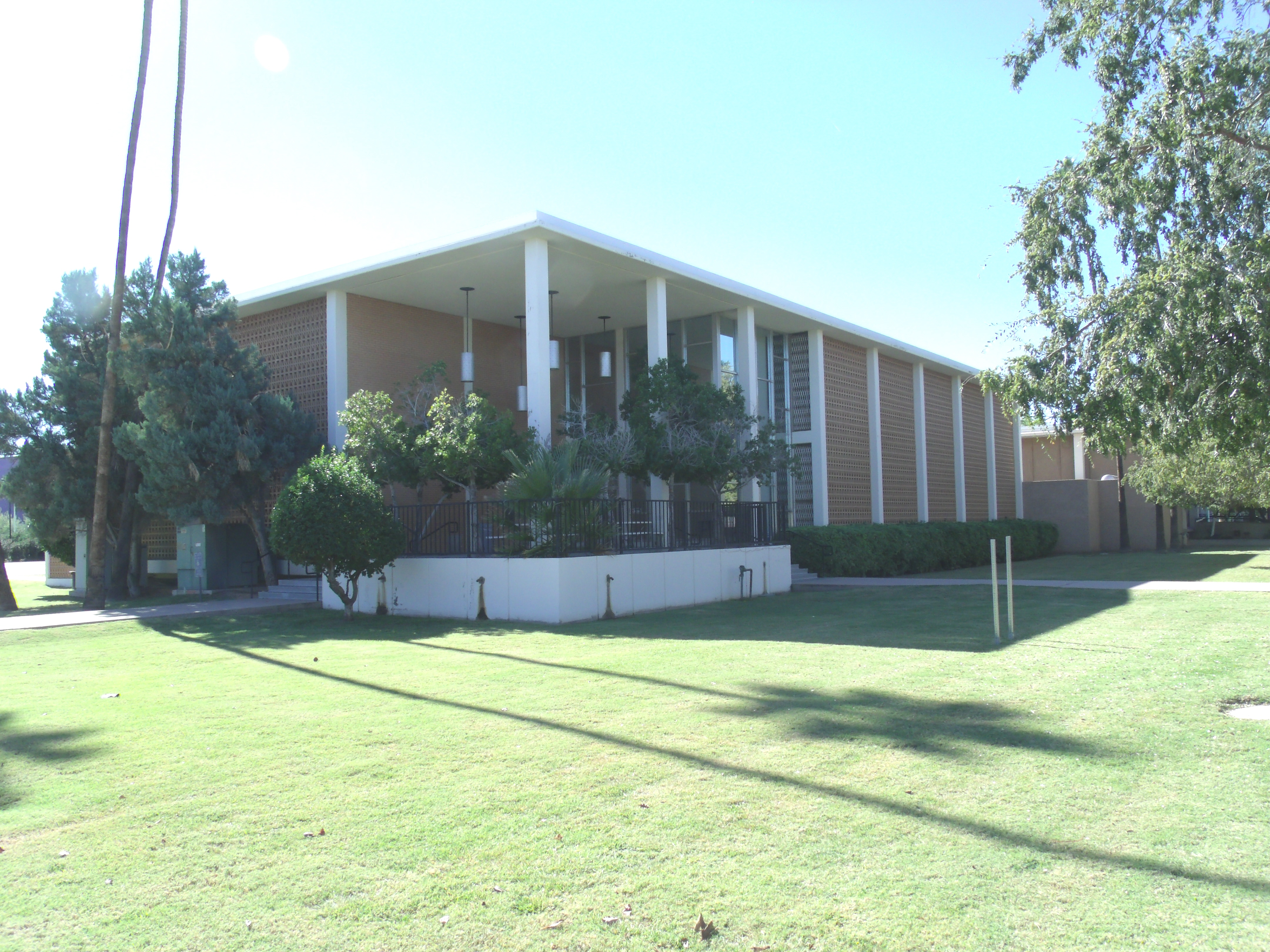
The Information Technology Department Building (1959).

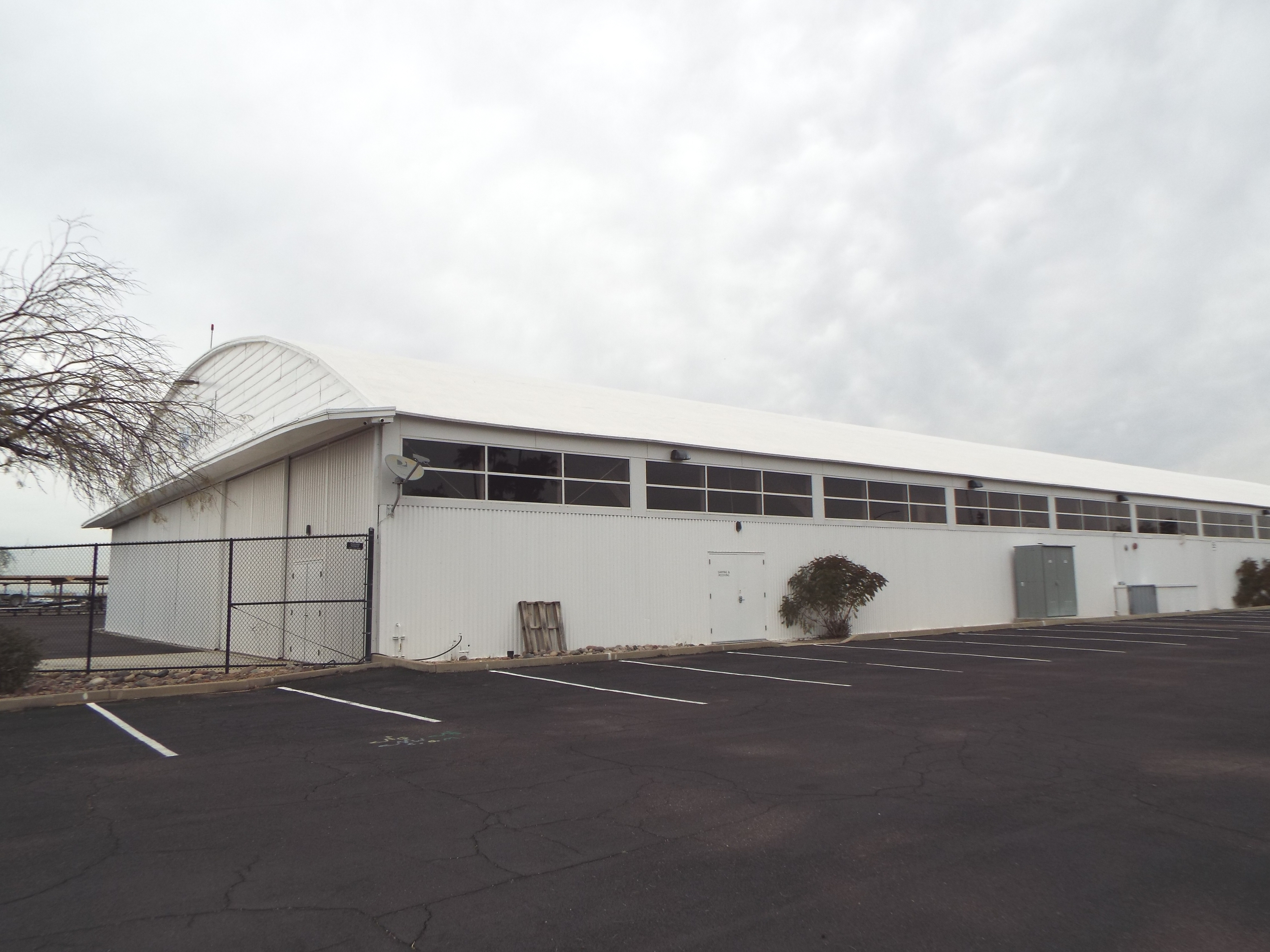
Falcon Field World War II Aviation Hangar (East Hangar).

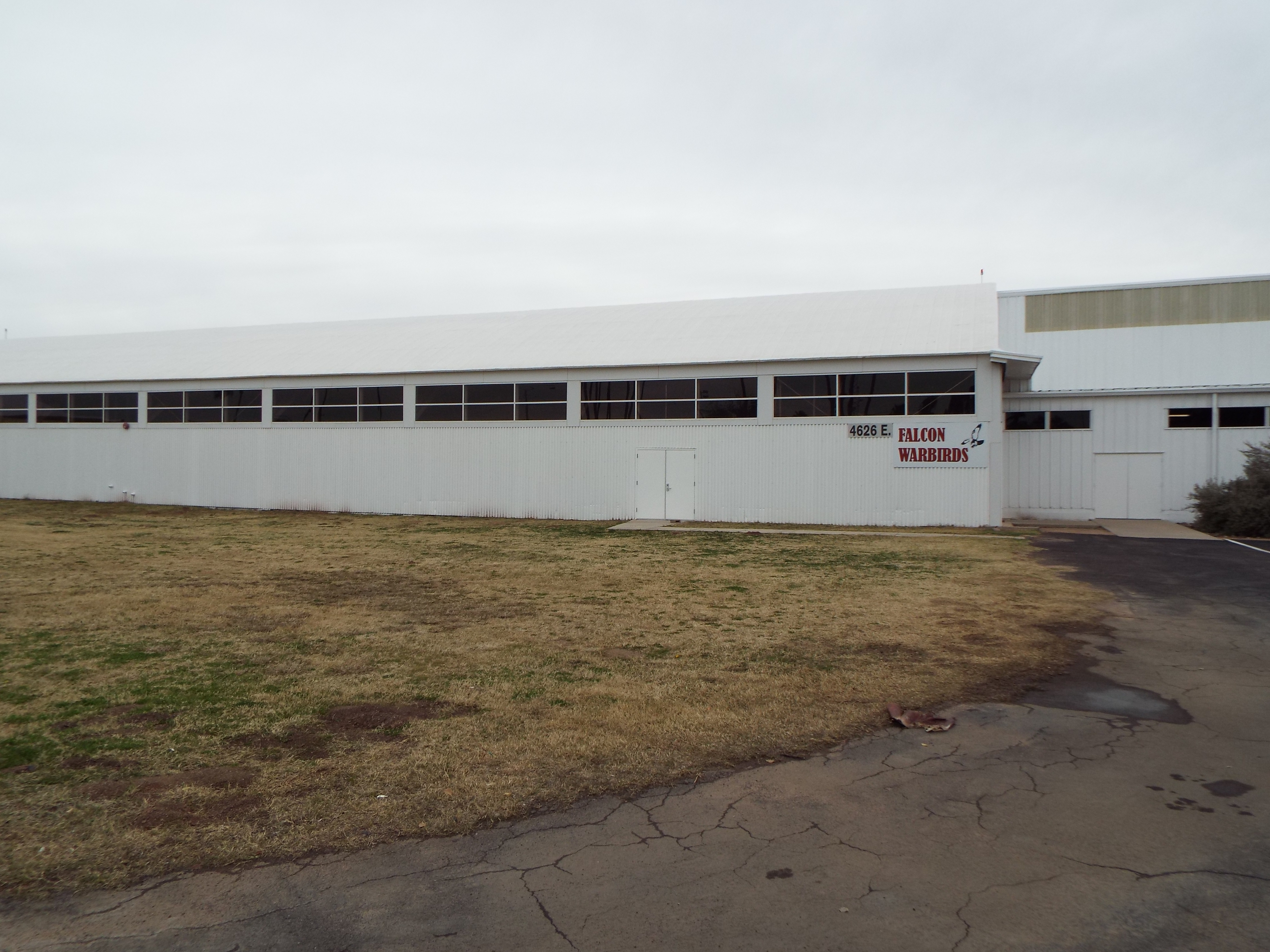
Falcon Field World War II Aviation Hangar (West Hangar).

== Houses of Religious Worship ==
- The First United Methodist Church was built in 1894 and is located at 15 E. First Ave. The Methodist Church is the oldest one still in continuous use in Mesa. In 1893, Dr. E.W. Wilbur paid $300 for two parcels where the church was to be built. In 1893, the church was chartered and it was first constructed in 1894. It is listed in the Mesa Historic Property Register.
- The Mount Calvary Baptist Church was built in 1918 and is located at 1720 E. Broadway Ave. Mt. Calvary Baptist Church is the oldest predominantly Black Church in Mesa. In 1918, the late Reverend J.B. Bell organized the mission into a formal church. These early members gave the church the name it bears today, Mt. Calvary Baptist Church. The church is listed in the Mesa Historic Property Register.
- The Mesa Arizona Temple was built in 1919. This temple of The Church of Jesus Christ of Latter-day Saints is the namesake of, and central structure in the Historic Mesa Temple District, which is listed in the National Register of Historic Places.
- The Queen of Peace Church was built in 1947 and is located at 141 N MacDonald Rd. It is a non-Indian parish that has had a few Maya Indian parishioners.
Houses of Religious Worship
(NRHP = National Register of Historic Places)
(MHP = Mesa Historic Properties)
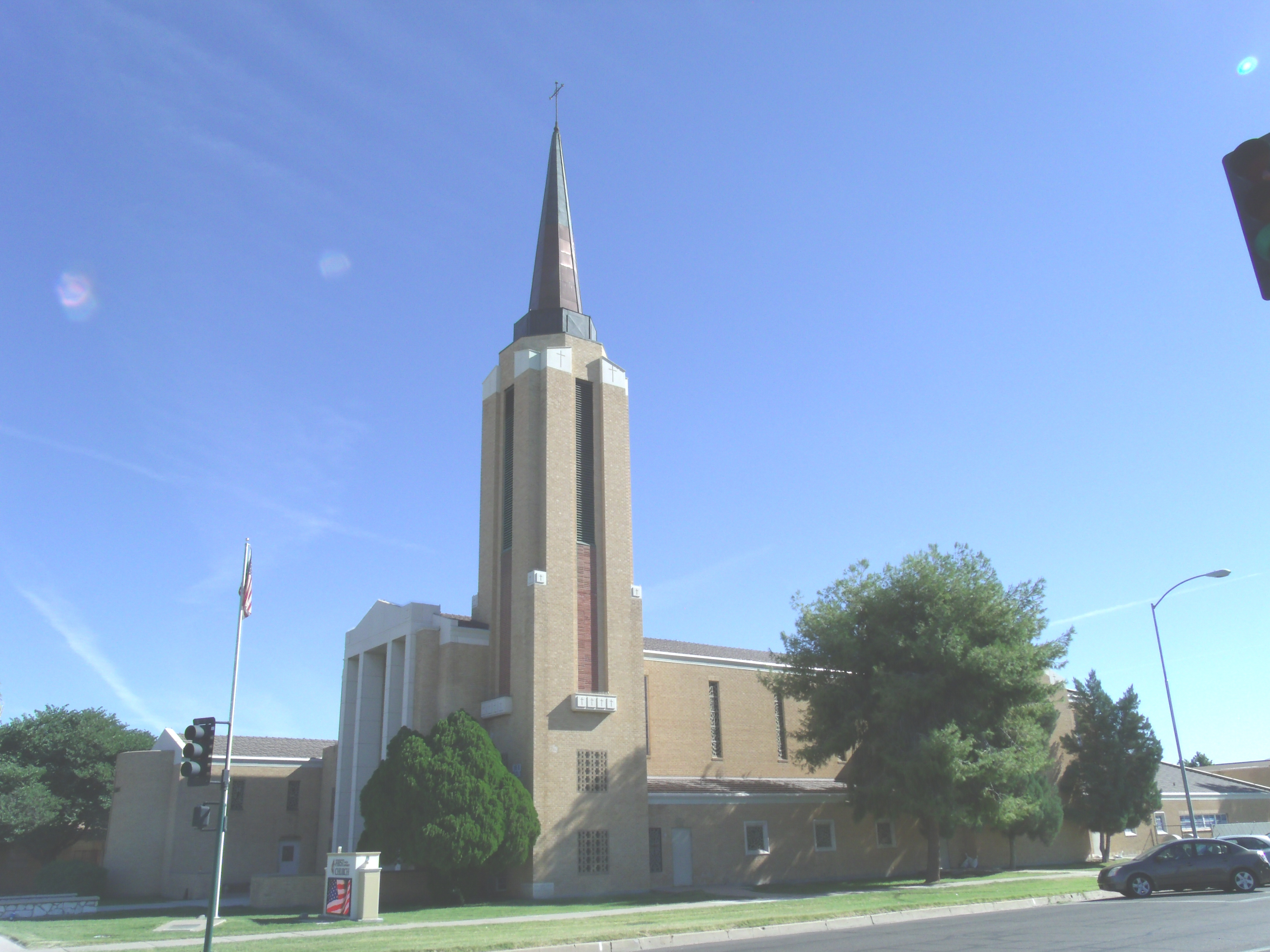
The First United Methodist Church.

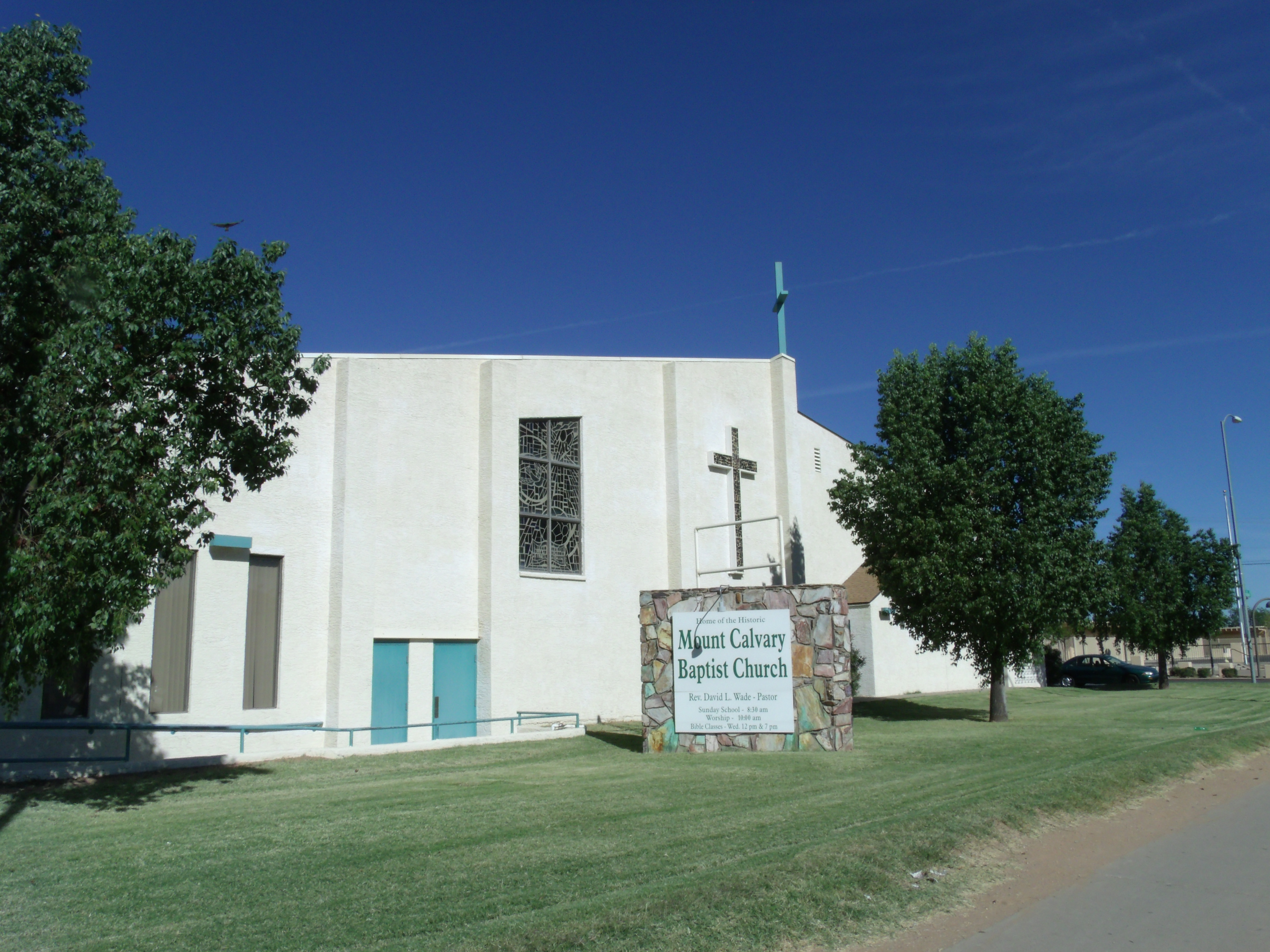
The Mount Calvary Baptist Church .

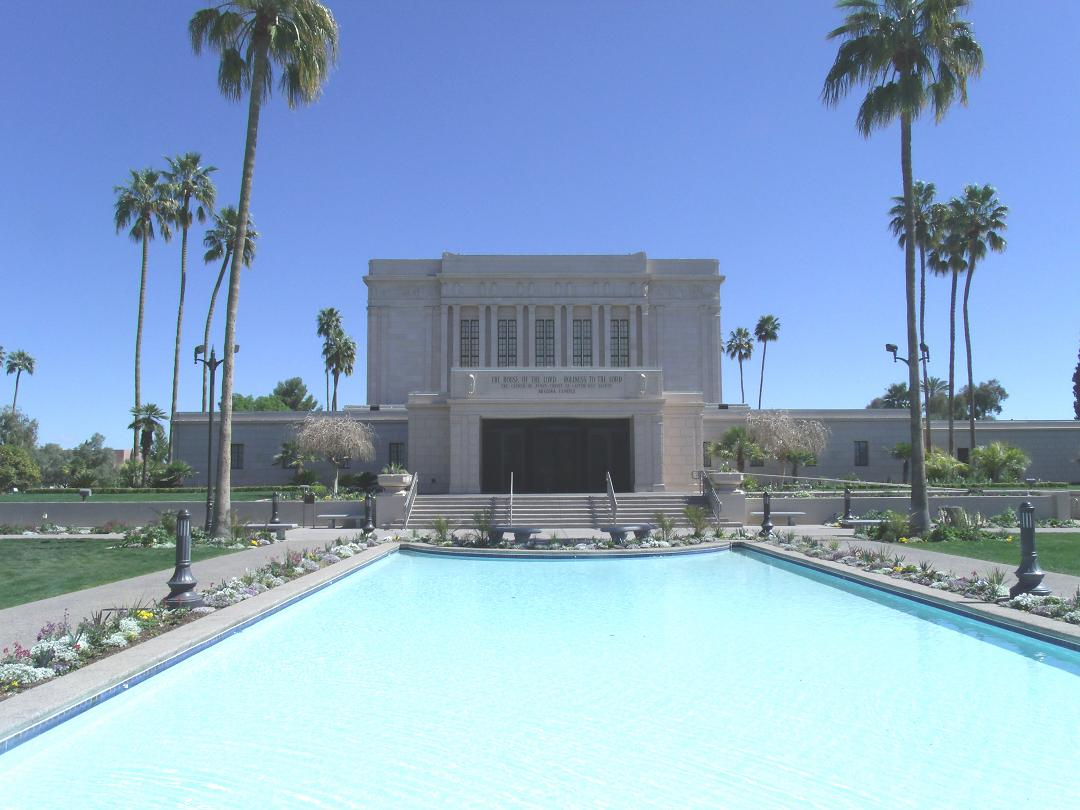
The Mesa Arizona Temple.

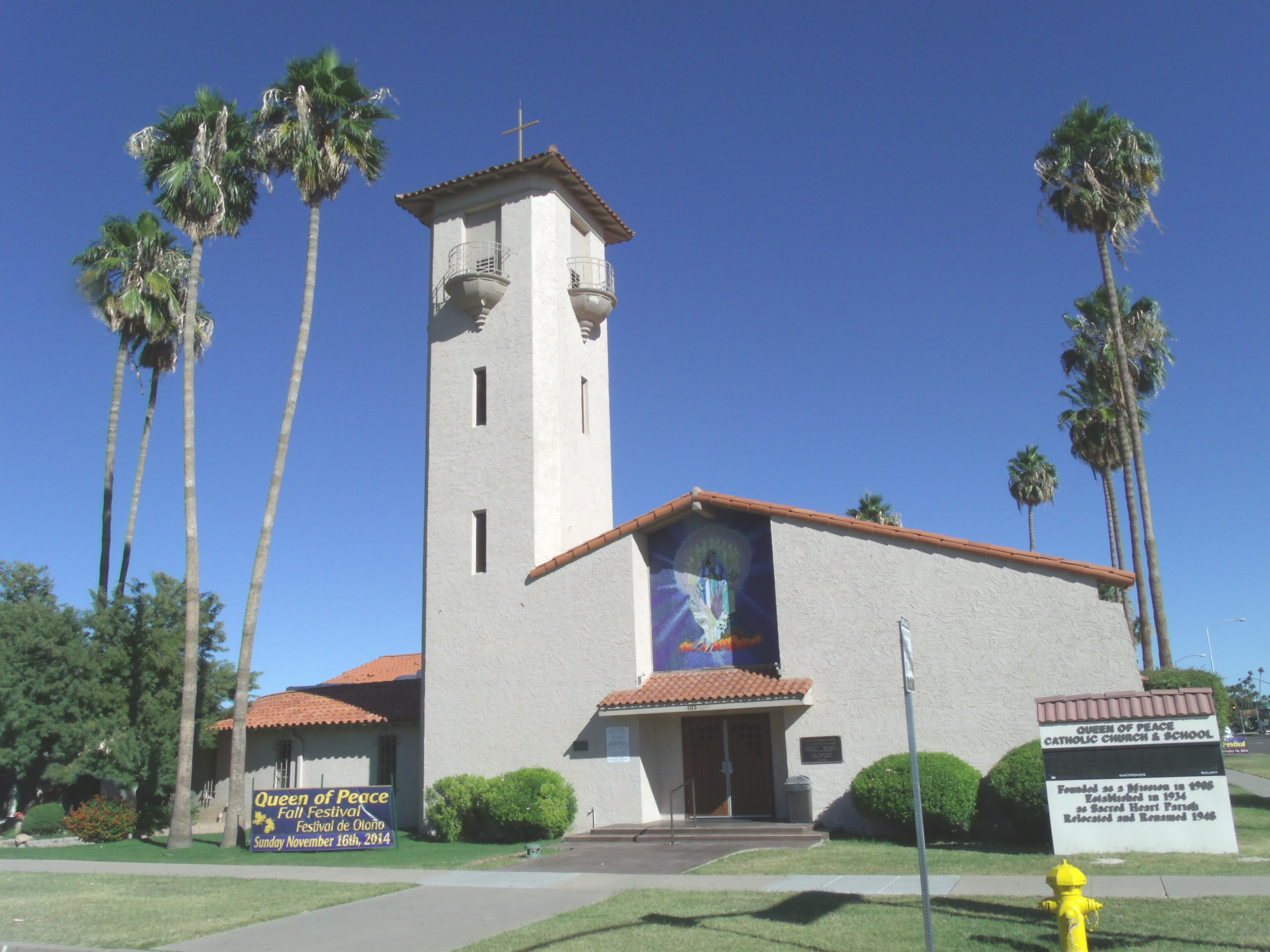
The historic Queen of Peace Church.

== Houses ==
The following is a brief description of the houses pictured in this section.

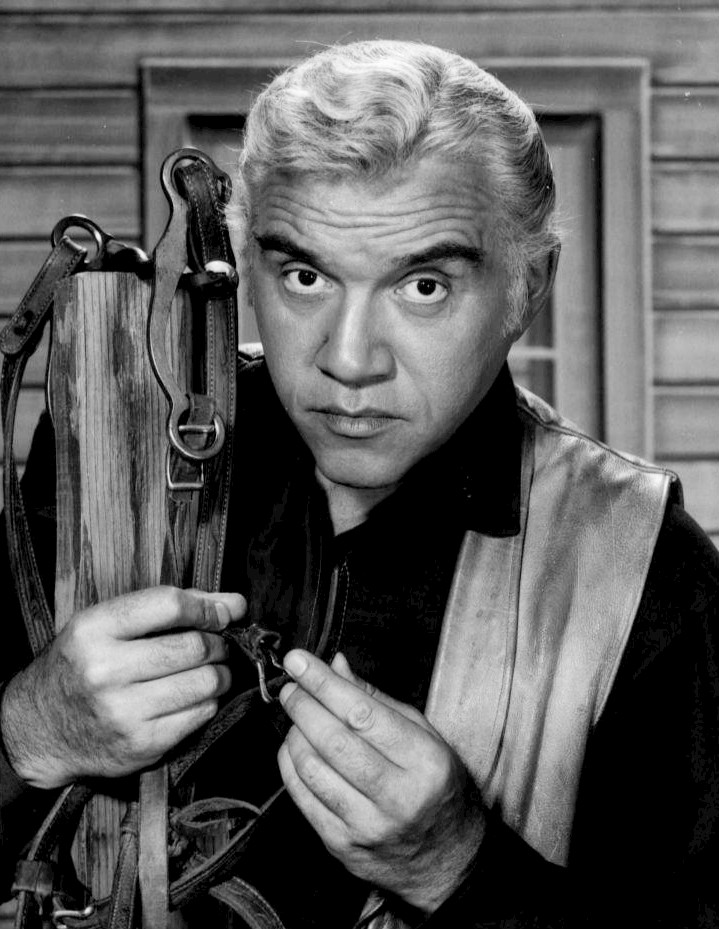
Actor Lorne Greene lived in the Ponderosa II House in Mesa

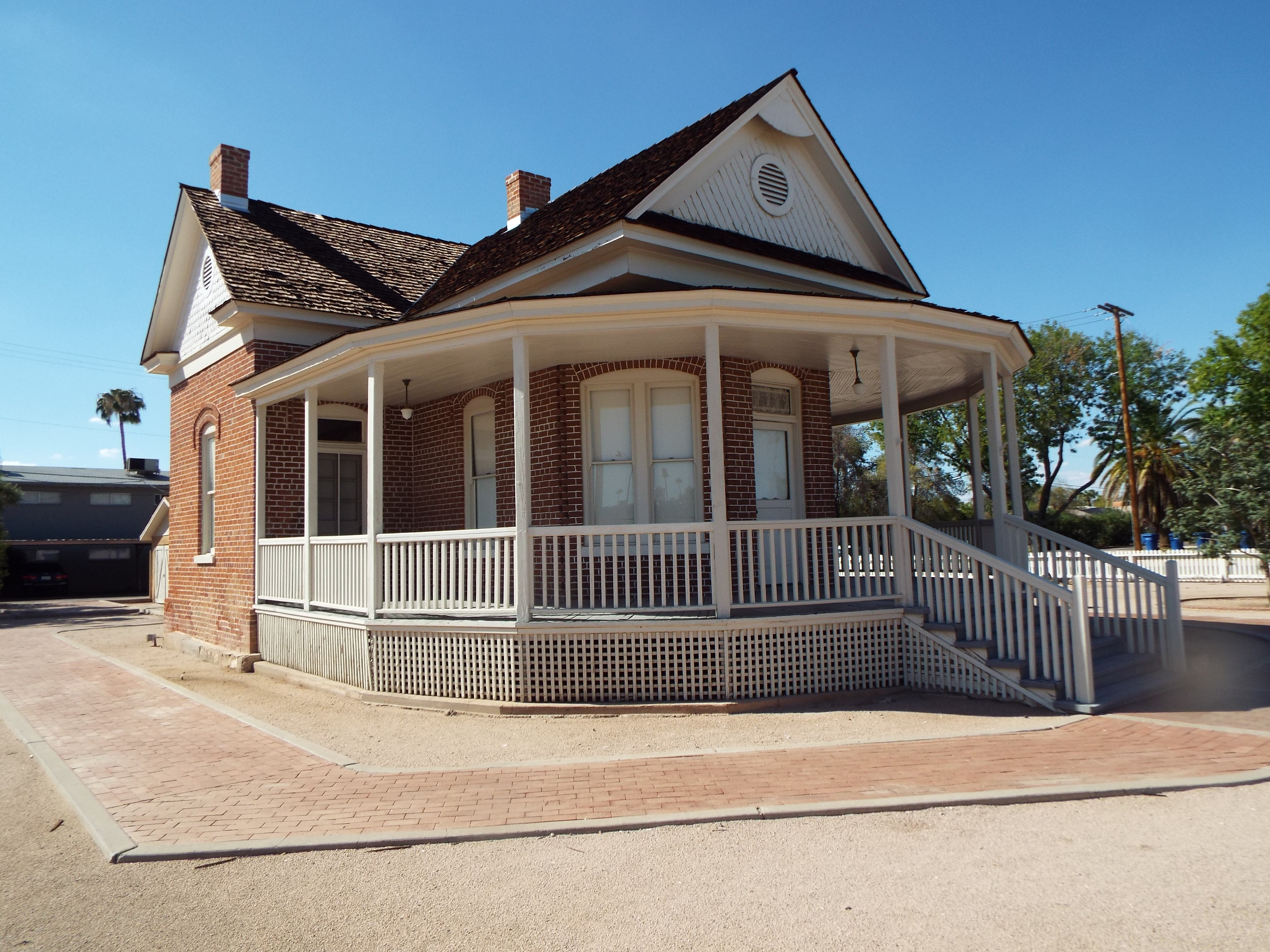
Sirrine House – 1896

- The Sirrine House was built in 1896 Historic Significance: Architecture/Engineering, Architect, builder, or engineer: Sirrine, Joel E., Architectural Style: Queen Anne, Area of Significance: Architecture, Period of Significance: 1900–1924, 1875–1899.
- The Kent House was built in 1900 and is located at 454 East 1 st. Ave. Dr. Melvin Kent worked in the South-side Clinic and was known for his work ethic and nightly house calls.
- The Angulo-Hostetter House was built in 1902 (NRHP) Historic Significance: Architecture/Engineering, Architectural Style: Colonial Revival, Queen Anne, Area of Significance: Architecture, Period of Significance: 1925–1949, 1900–1924.
- The Strauch-Fuller House, built in 1906 (NRHP) Historic Significance: Architecture/Engineering, Architect, builder, or engineer: Unknown, Architectural Style: Mission/Spanish Revival, Area of Significance: Architecture, Period of Significance: 1900–1924.
- The Robert Scott House was built in 1909 and is located at 2230 E. Grandview St. in Mesa. The residence belonged to Robert Scott, a wealthy Mesa sheep farmer and large landowner, who was a co-founder of the Salt River Bank. The Scott House originally stood within the original Mesa townsite on the corner of First and Sirrine Streets, and when completed was among the few large formal residences in Mesa. Commercial expansion and downtown redevelopment projects during the past twenty years have changed the character of the townsite area. The original site of the Scott House was sold for commercial development in 1972, and the house was subsequently moved six miles to a residential subdivision where it is now located. The property was listed in the National Register of Historic Places on July 8, 1982, reference #82002079.
- The Max Viault House was built in 1908 and is located at 156 N. MacDonald Road. The house belonged to Max Viault who served as Mayor of Mesa from 1914 to 1916.
- The Spangler-Wilbur House, built in 1915, (NRHP) Historic Significance: Architecture/Engineering, Architect, builder, or engineer: Home Builders Inc., Architectural Style: Colonial Revival, Mission/Spanish Revival, Area of Significance: Architecture, Period of Significance: 1900–1924.
- The James A. Macdonald House, built in 1916–1918 (MHP). Macdonald was an early Mesa Pioneer. He was a former police officer, farmer, and builder and helped in the construction of the Arizona LDS Temple.
- The Dr. Lucius Charles Alston House, built in 1920 (NRHP). The Dr. Lucius Charles Alston House is associated with the history of the development of the African American community in Mesa. The house served as Dr. Alston's office while practicing medicine in Mesa.
- The Mesa Journal – Tribune FHA Demonstration Home. Also known as Charles A. Mitten Home. Area of Significance: Commerce, Community Planning And Development; Period of Significance: 1925–1949 (NRHP).
- The Tibshraeny House was built in 1932 and located at 215 N. Robson. The Tibshraeny's were one of several well-known Lebanese families who owned businesses in early Chandler. Jay Tibshraeny's grandfather, Michael Ferris Tibshraeny, immigrated to the state in 1913 from Lebanon and subsequently settled in 1918, opening a Western and clothing store in downtown Mesa.
- The Fitch Farm House was built in 1933 and is located at 945 N. Center Street. The farm belonged to Larkin Fitch. He married Mildred Dobson, daughter of John Dobson. Larkin Fitch played a prominent role in the farming industry in Mesa. The Fitch Farm House is an example of a Tudor Revival style house (MHP).
- The Drew House was built in 1935 and is located at 461 E. 1st. Ave.
- The Ellsworth House was built in 1938 and is located at 444 E. 1st. Ave. The small Tudor-styled cottage was built for German and Mary Ellsworth.
- The Killian House was built in 1940 and located at 440 E. 1st. Ave. The Killian family were ranchers who played an important role in the development of the farming industry in Mesa.
- The Ramon Garcia Mendoza House was built in 1944 and is located at 126 N. Pomeroy Lane. Ramon Garcia Mendoza was the first Hispanic Chief of Police in Mesa. He became a police officer in a time when segregation was still practiced in the city. Mendoza was appointed Police Chief in 1969 and served as such until his retirement in 1978. It is listed in the Mesa Historic Property Register.
- The Farnsworth House was built in 1951 and is located at 58 S. Udall Ave.
- The Ponderosa II House (Lorne Greene's house) was built in 1960 and is located at 602 S. Edgewater Dr. The house was built by actor Lorne Greene, who played Ben Cartwright, the patriarch of the Cartwright family in the popular 1960s TV series Bonanza. The house is a replica of Bonanza's Ponderosa Ranch House. It is listed in the Mesa Historic Property Register and on June 25, 2018, was listed in the National Register of Historic Places, ref. #100002146.
Historic houses in Mesa, Arizona

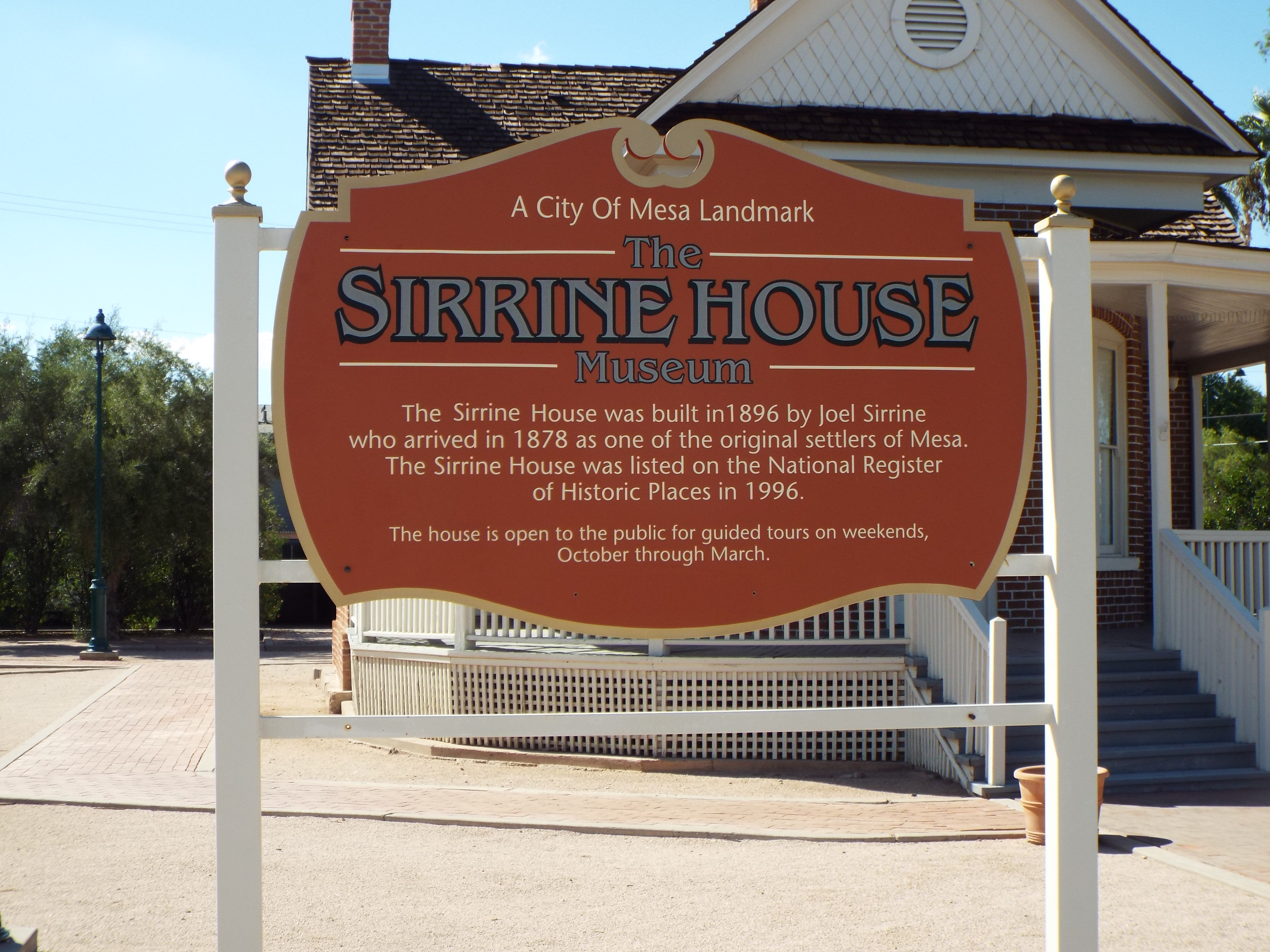
Mesa Landmark Sirrine House

(NRHP = National Register of Historic Places)
(MHP = Mesa Historic Properties)
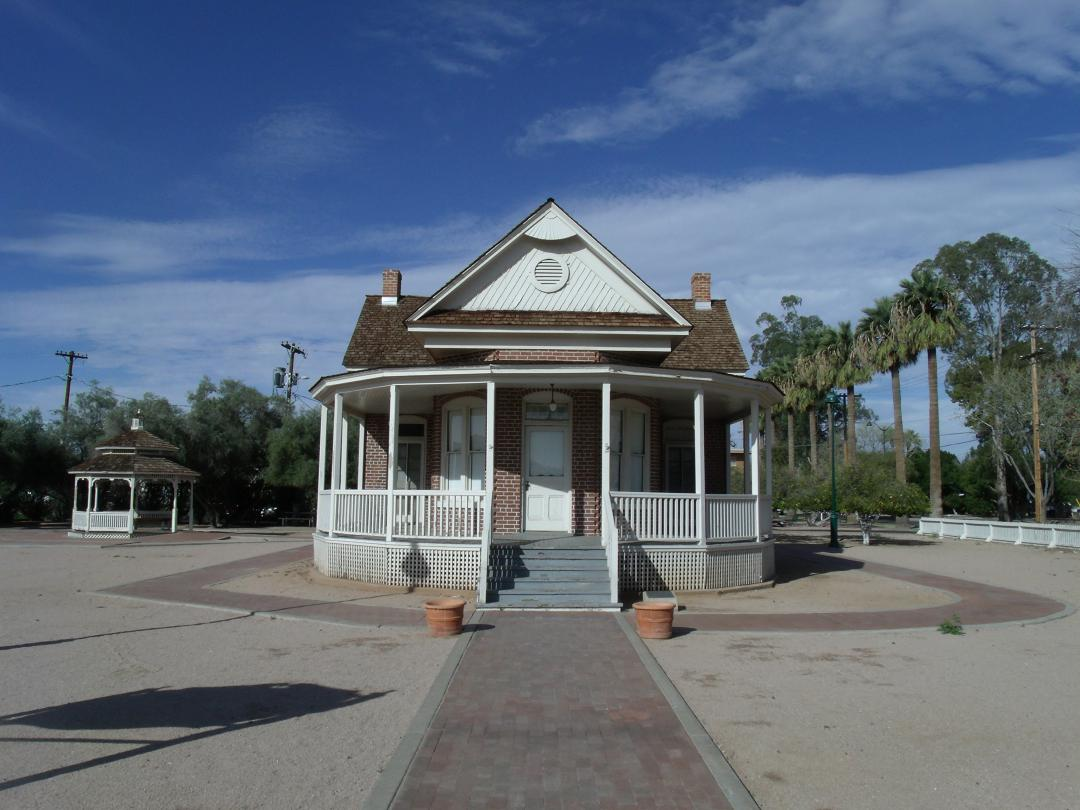
The Sirrine House.

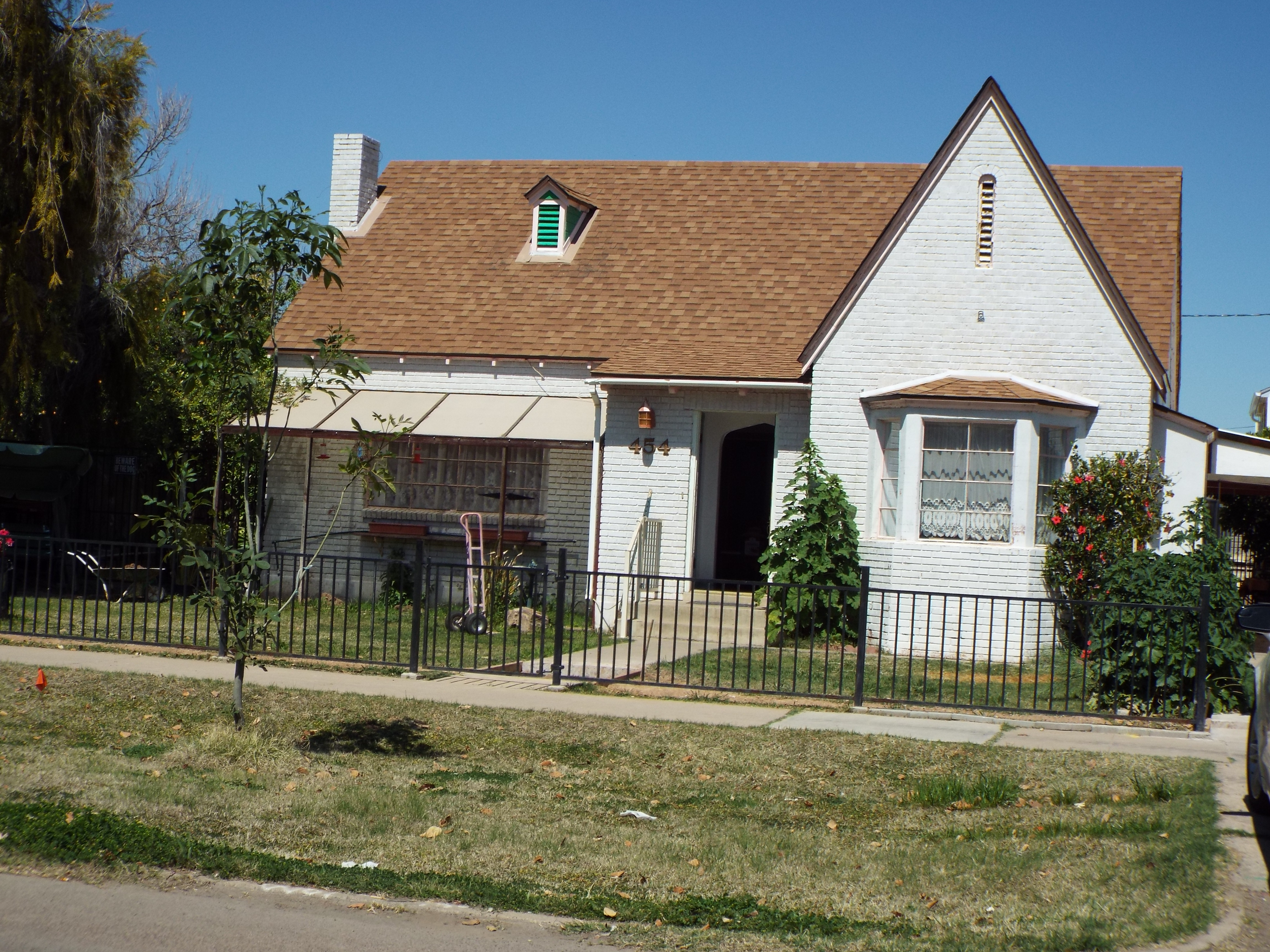
The Kent House.

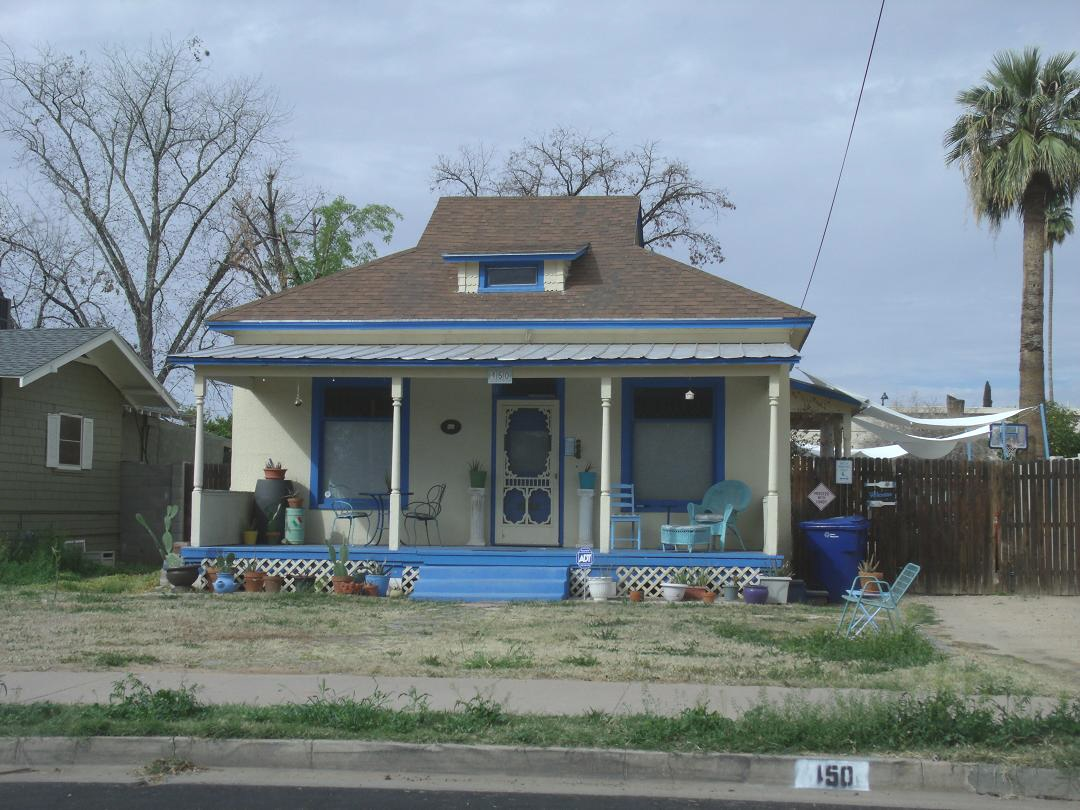
The Angulo-Hostetter House.

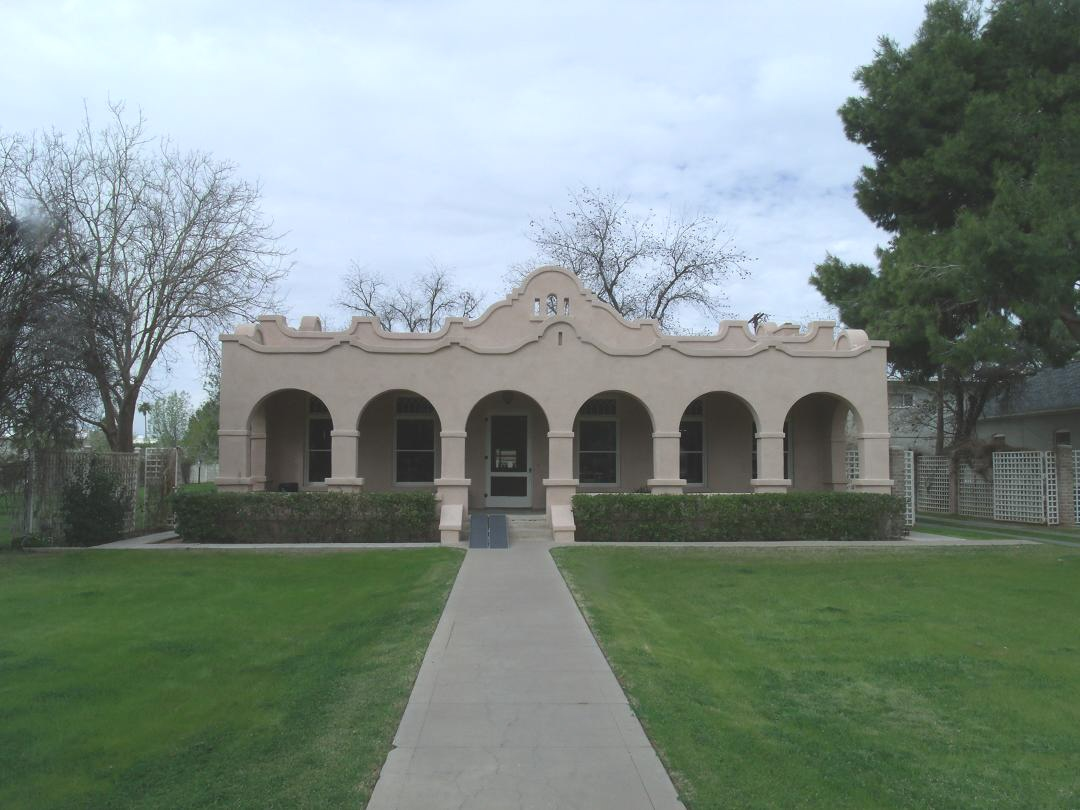
The Strauch-Fuller House.

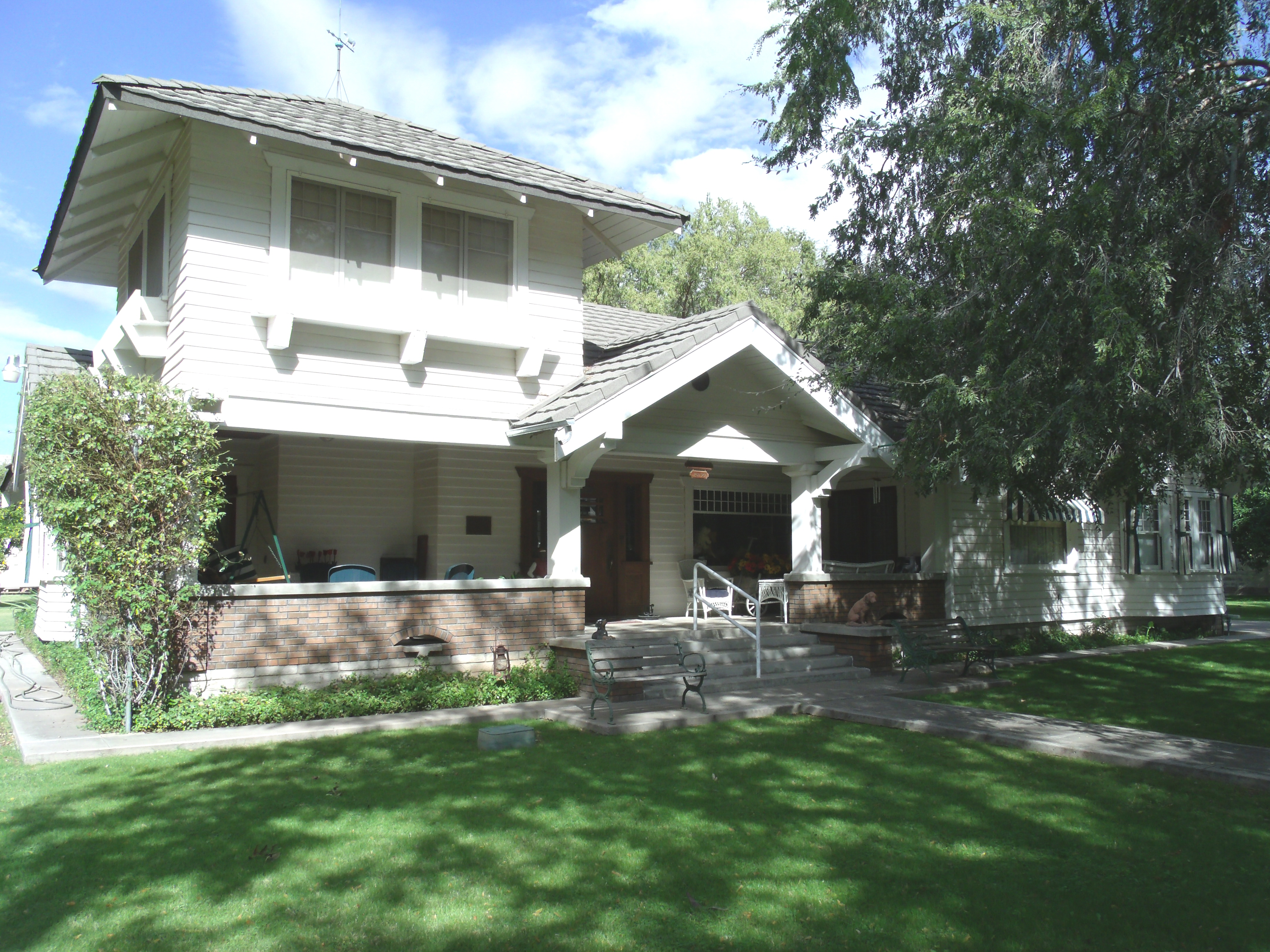
The Robert Scott House .

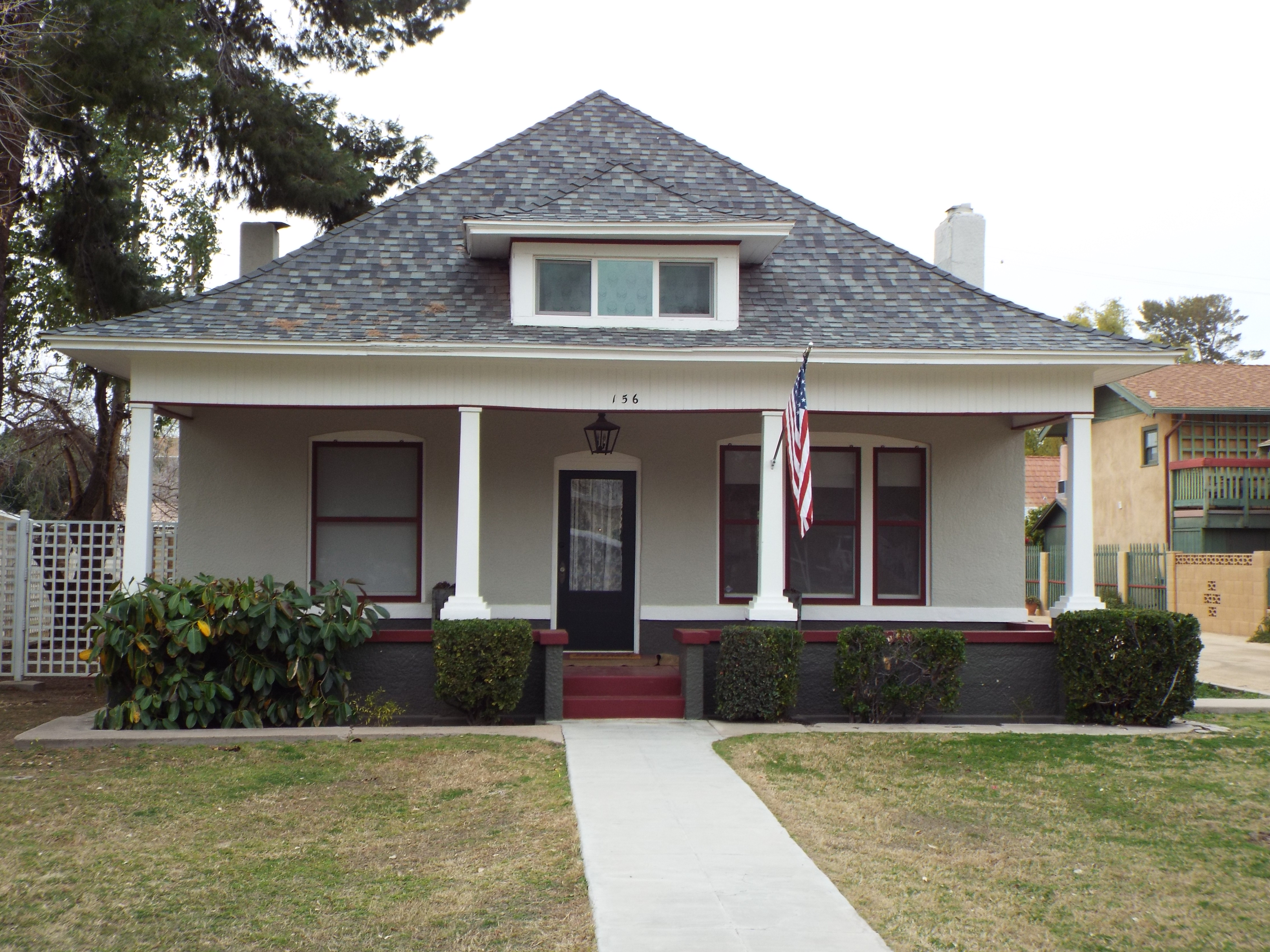
The Max Viault House.

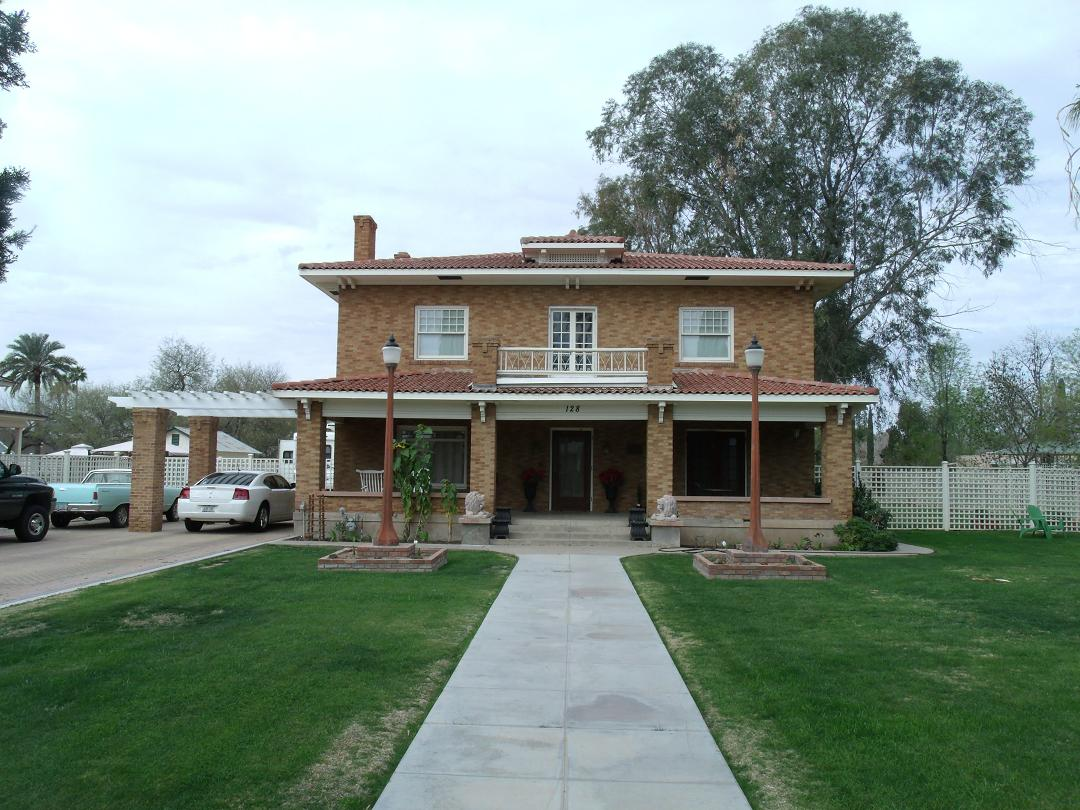
The Spangler-Wilbur House.

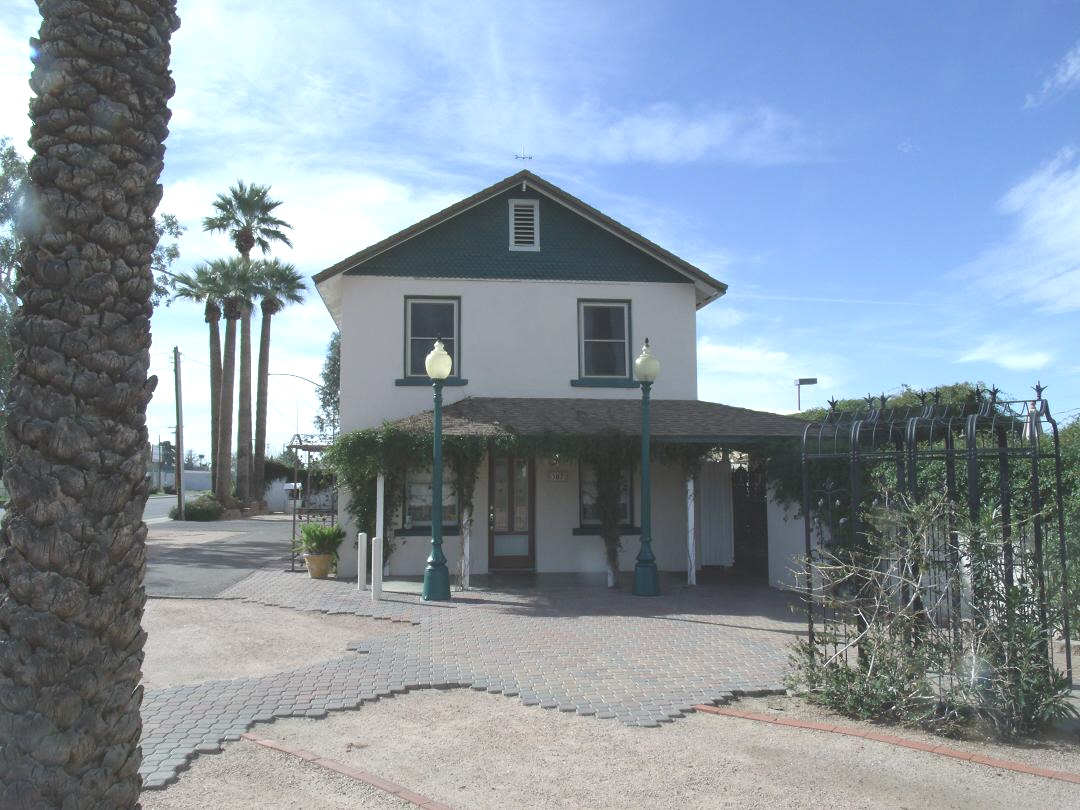
The James A. Macdonald House.

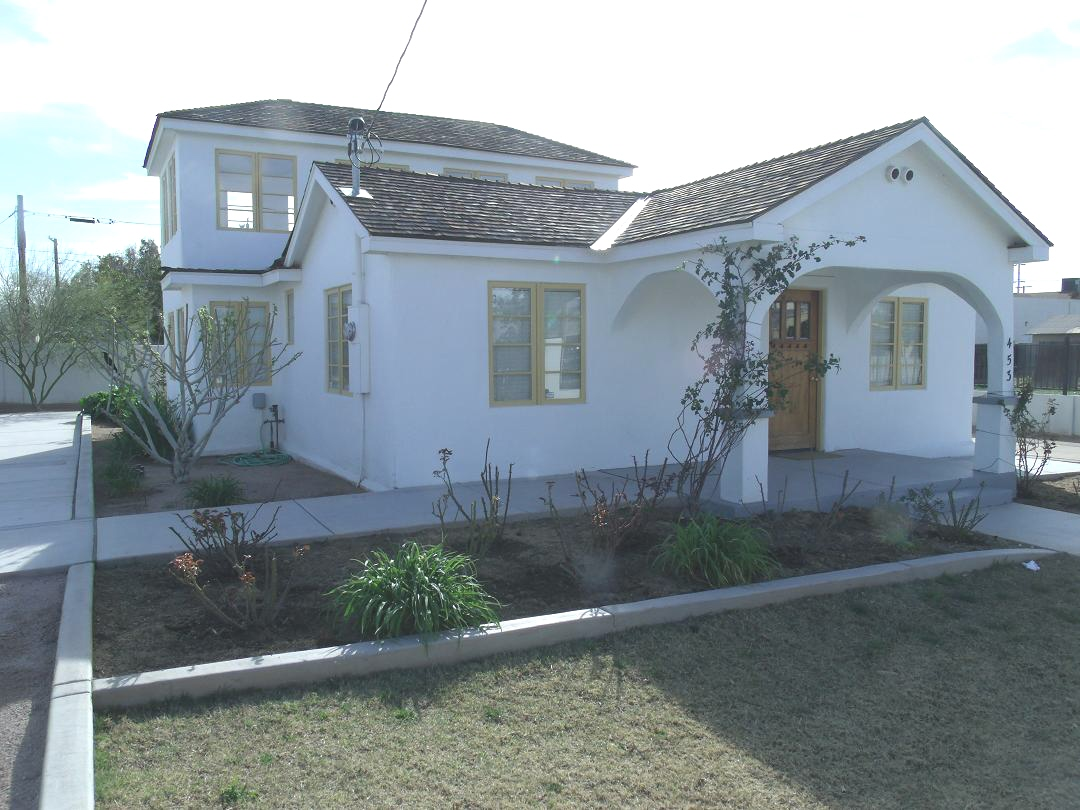
The Dr. Lucius Charles Alston House.

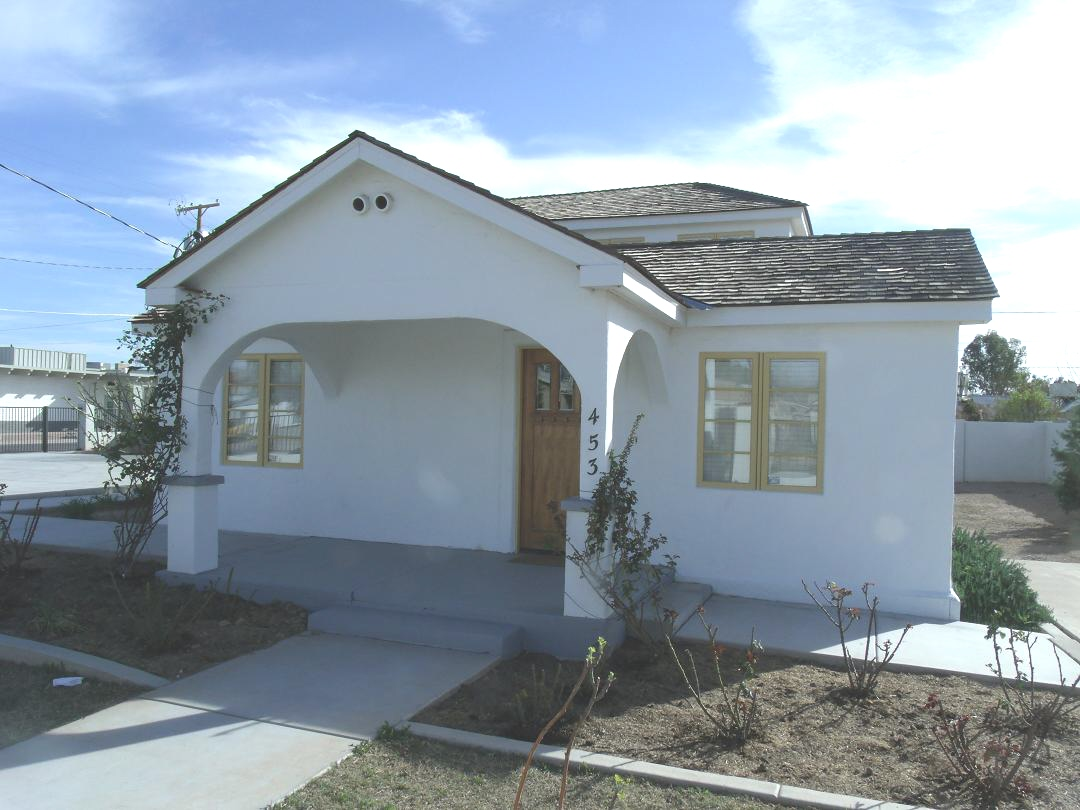
Different view of the Dr. Lucius Charles Aston House.

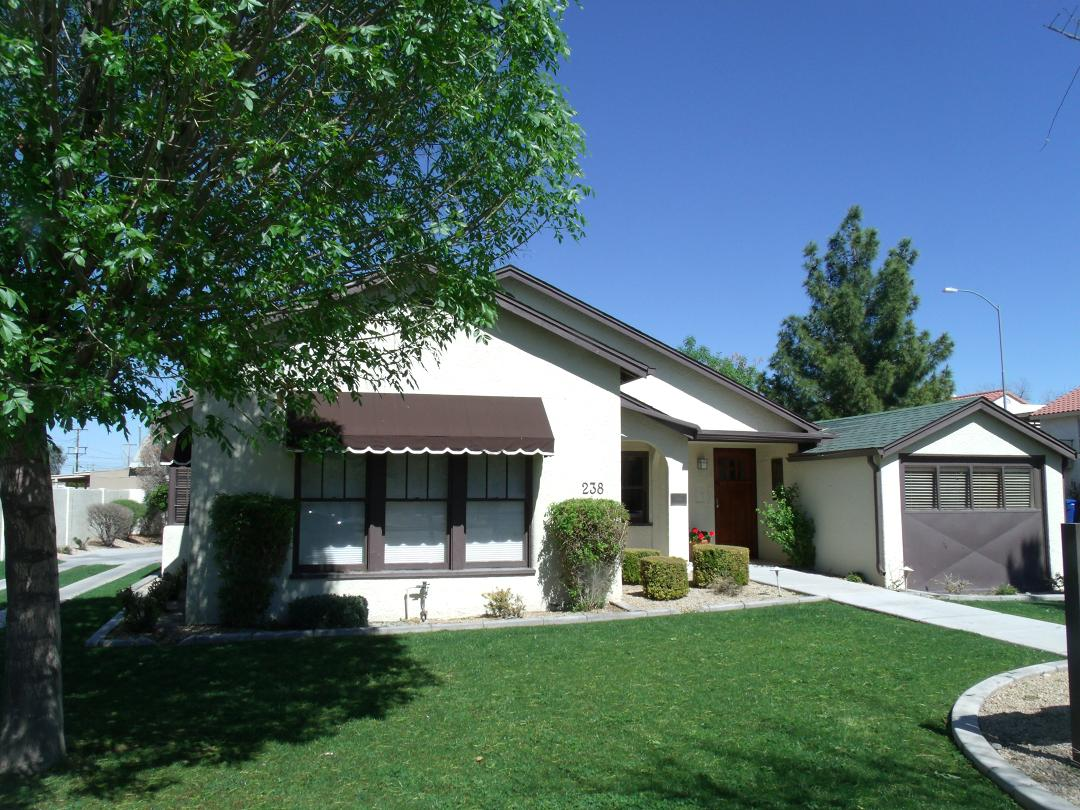
The Mesa Journal–Tribune FHA Demonstration Home.

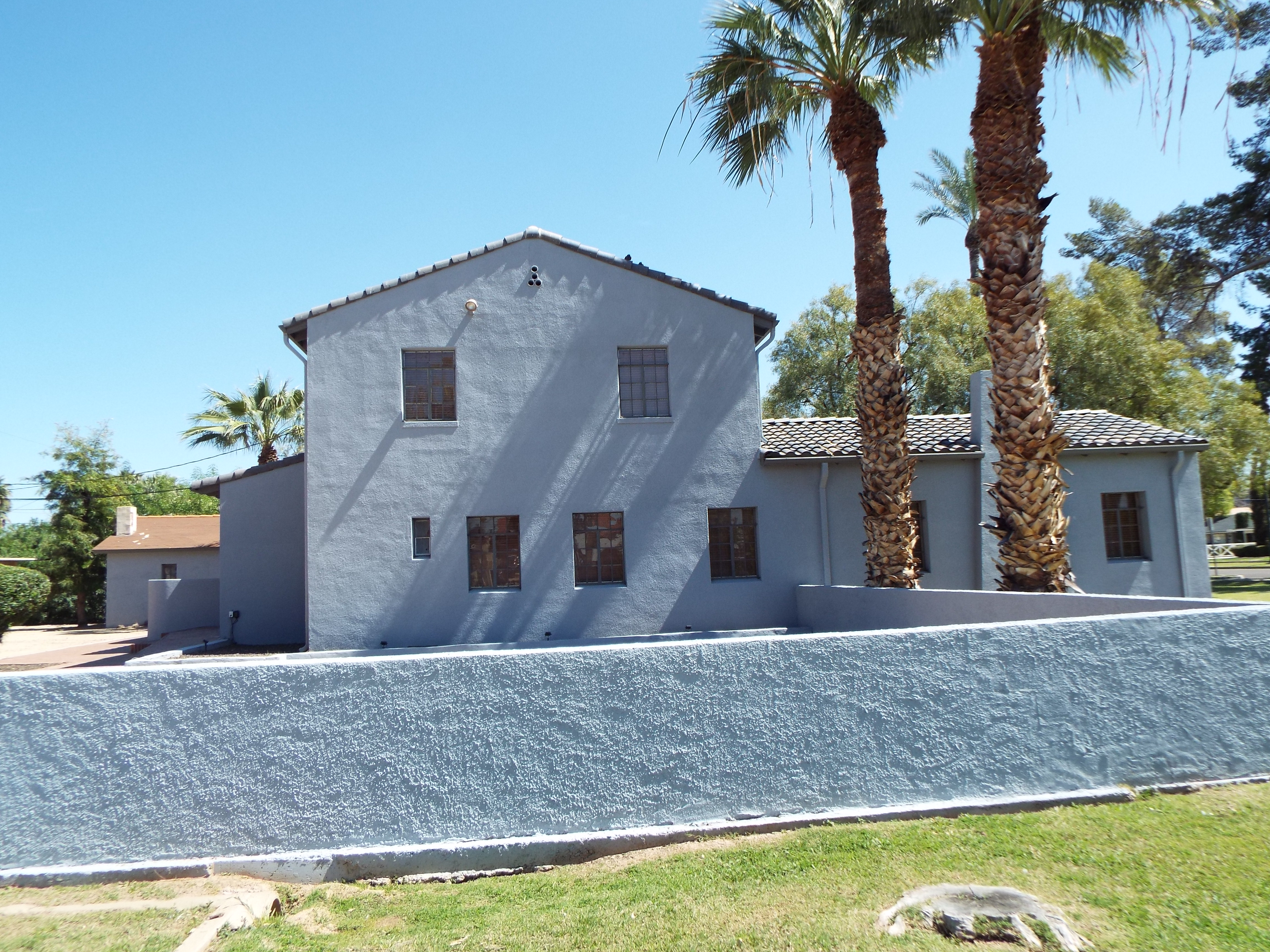
The Tibshraeny House

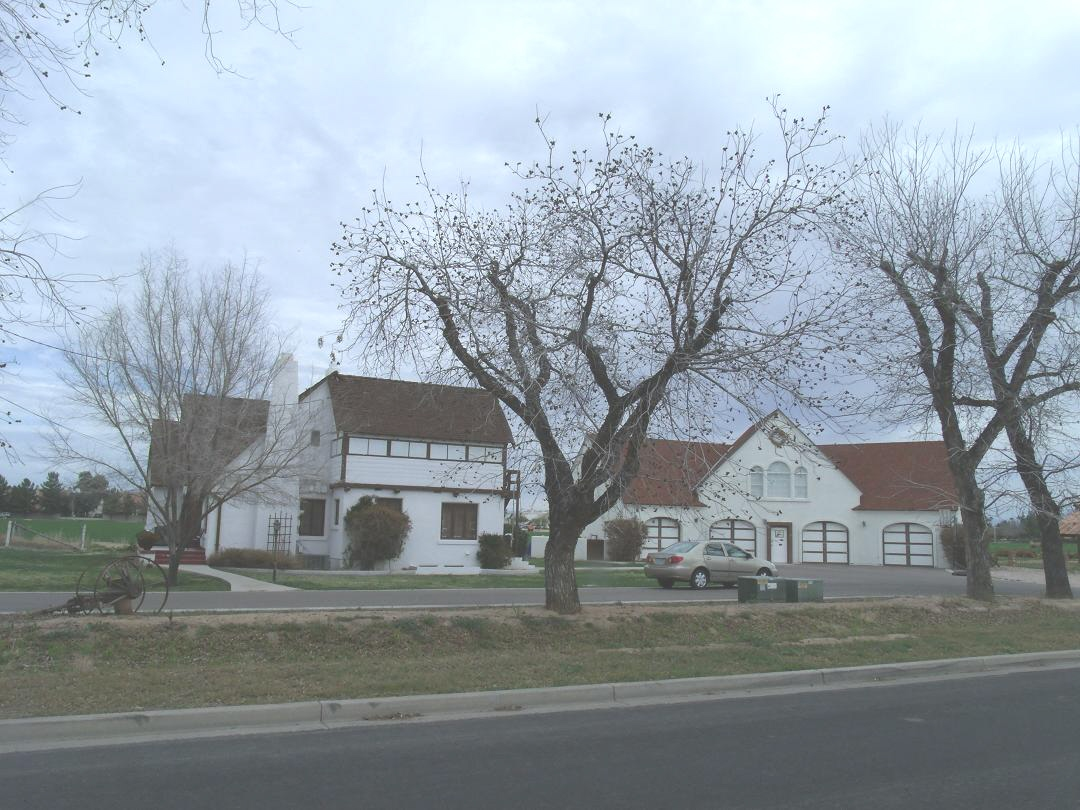
The Fitch Farm House.

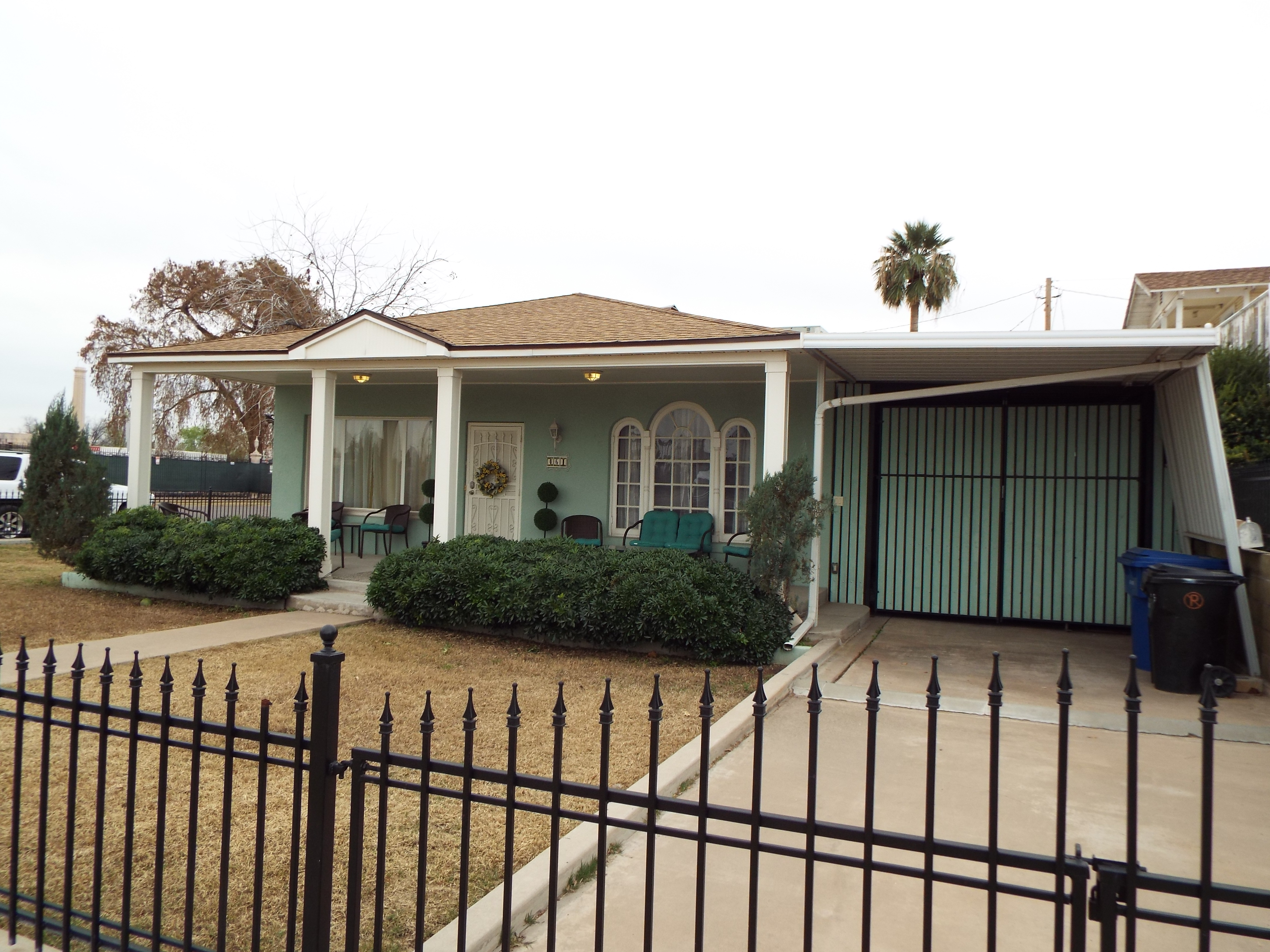
The Drew House.

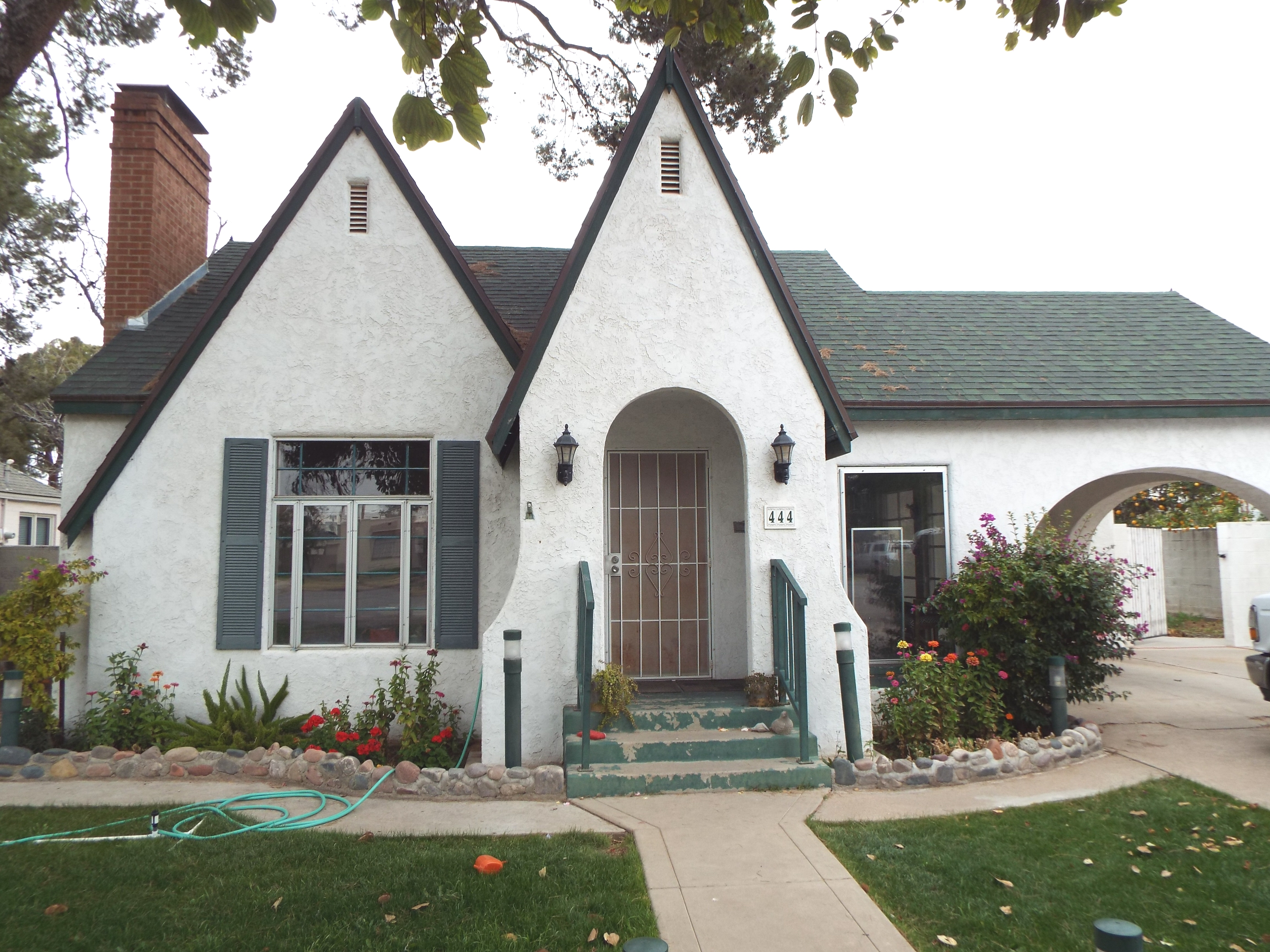
The Ellsworth House.

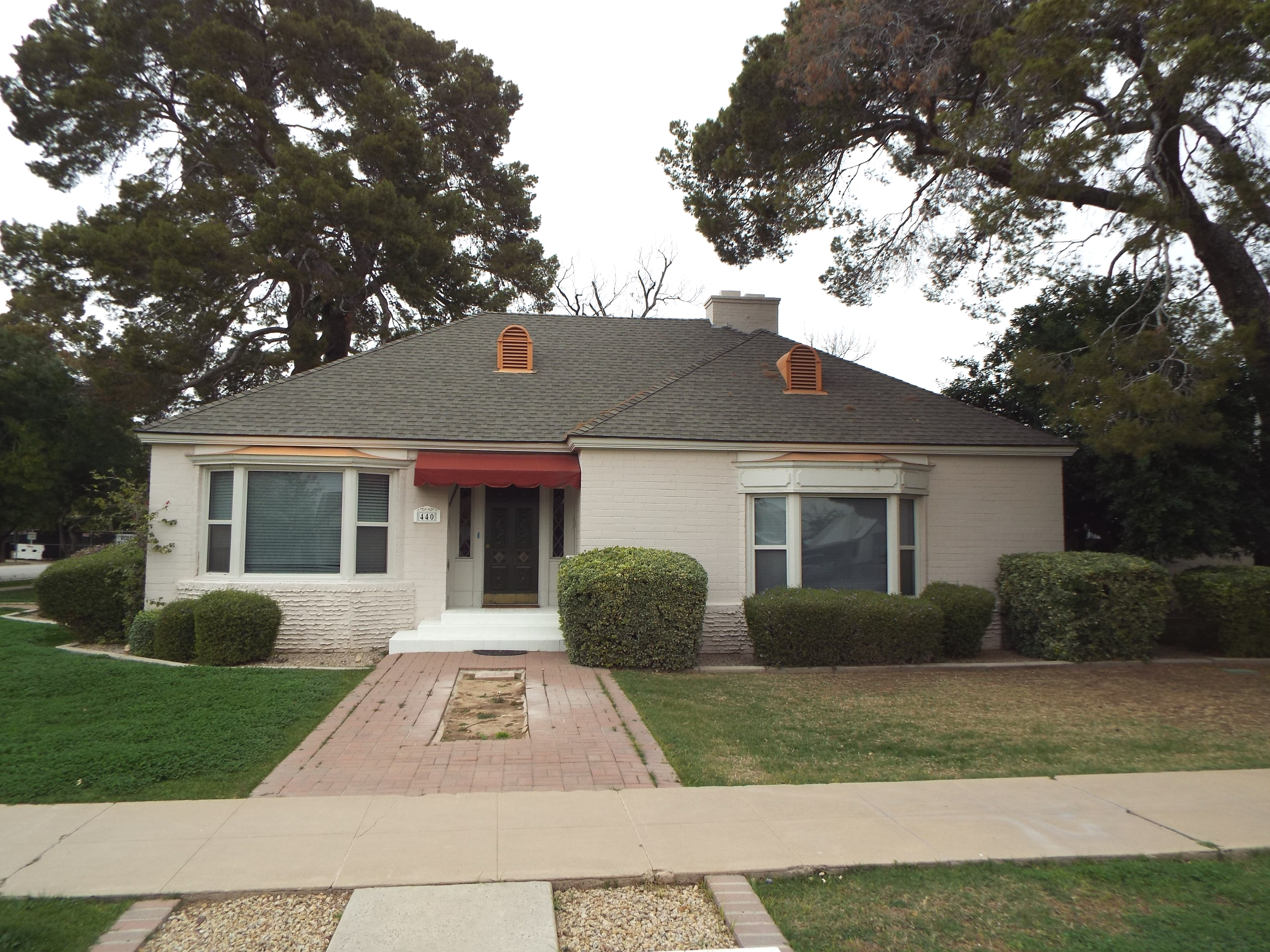
The Killian House.

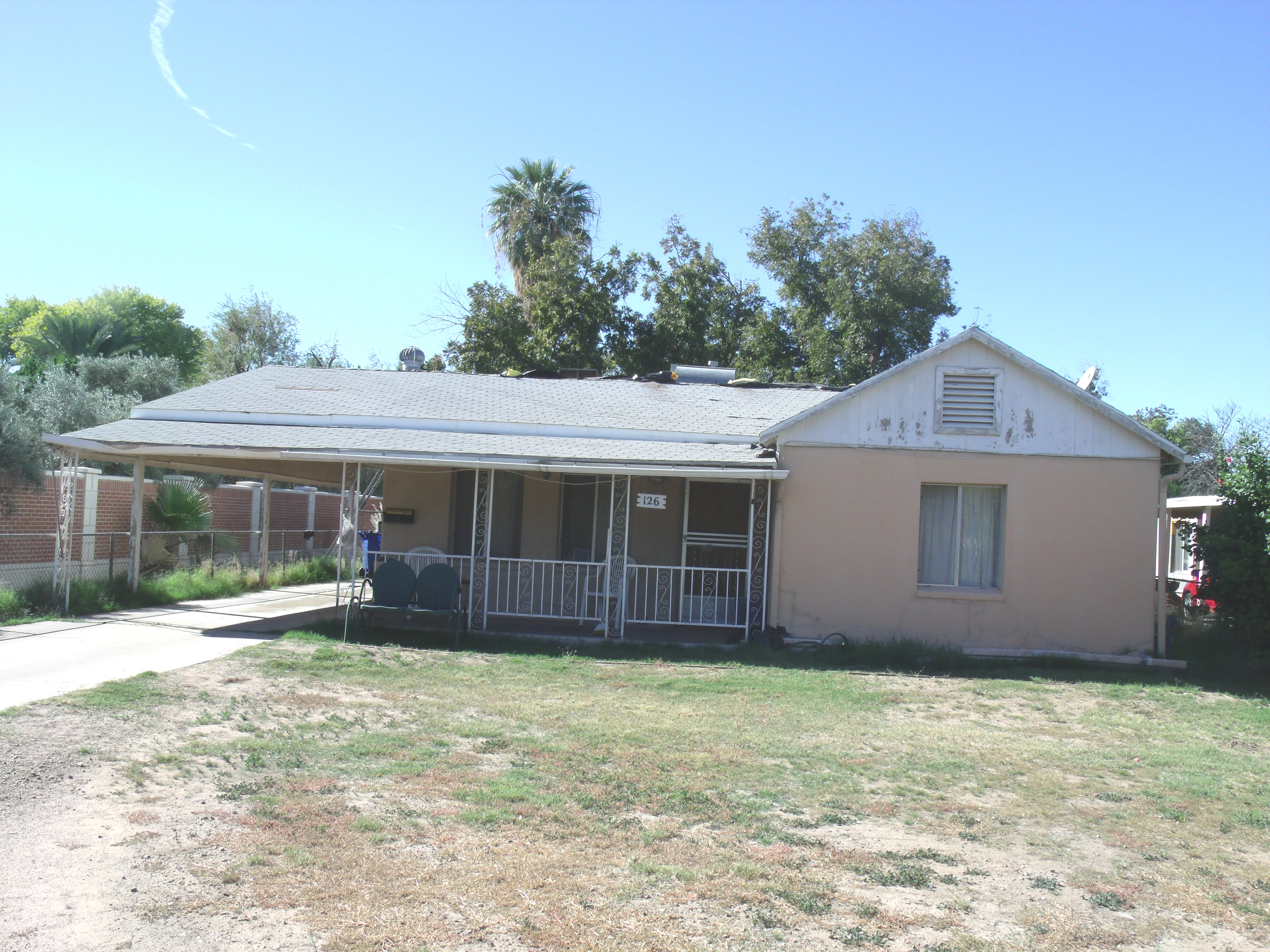
The Ramon Garcia Mendoza House.

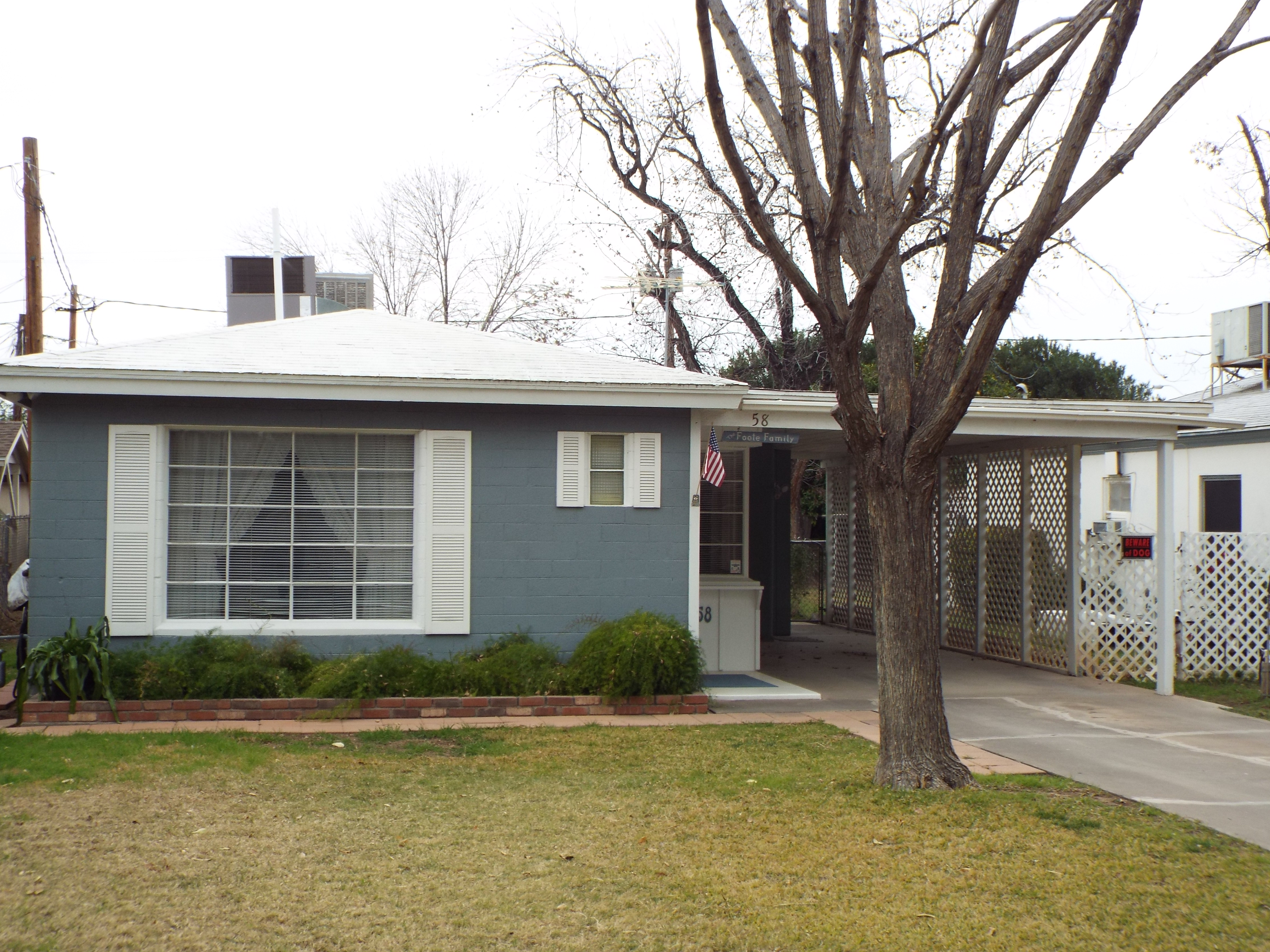
The Farnsworth House.

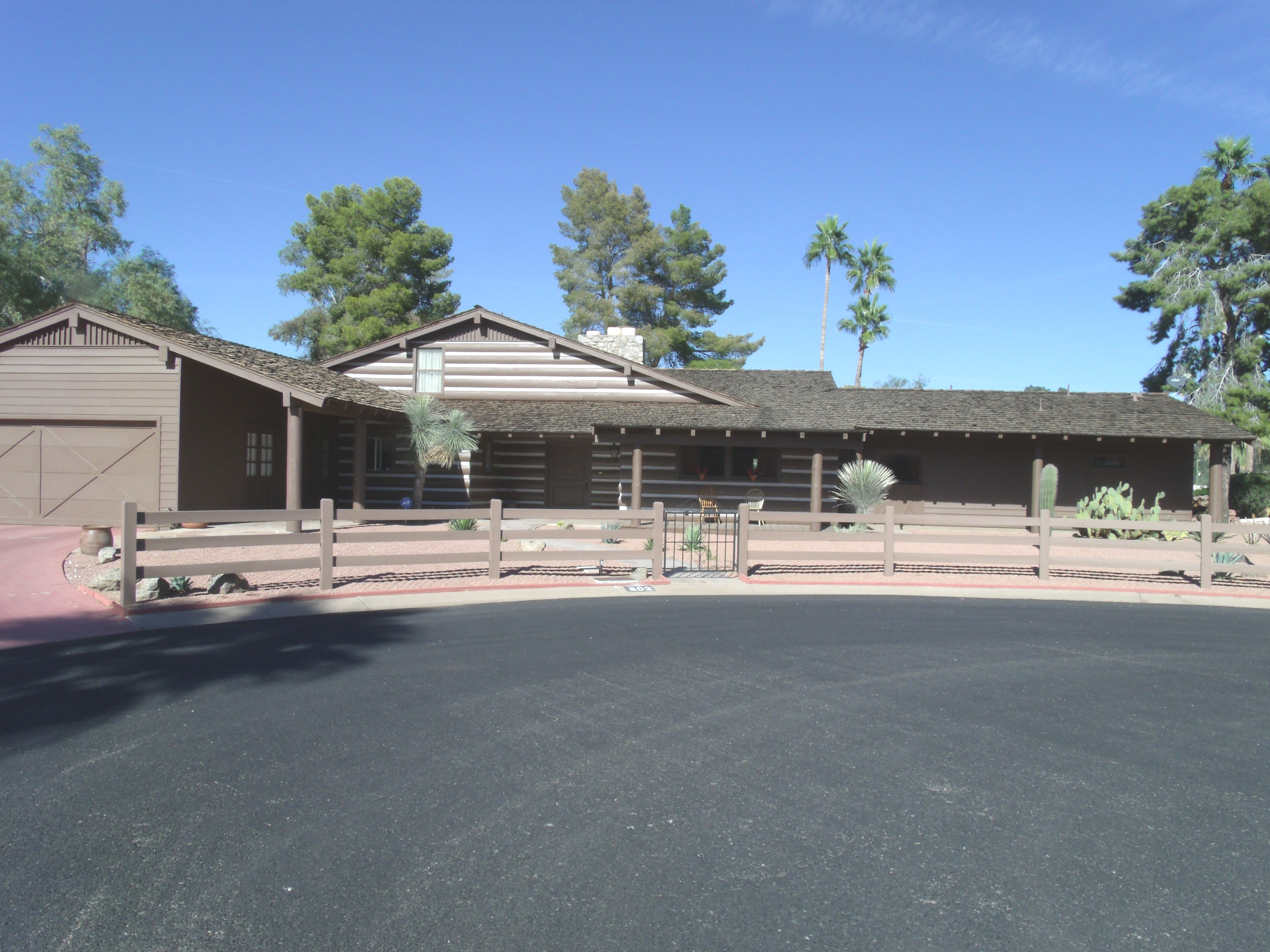
The Ponderosa II House.

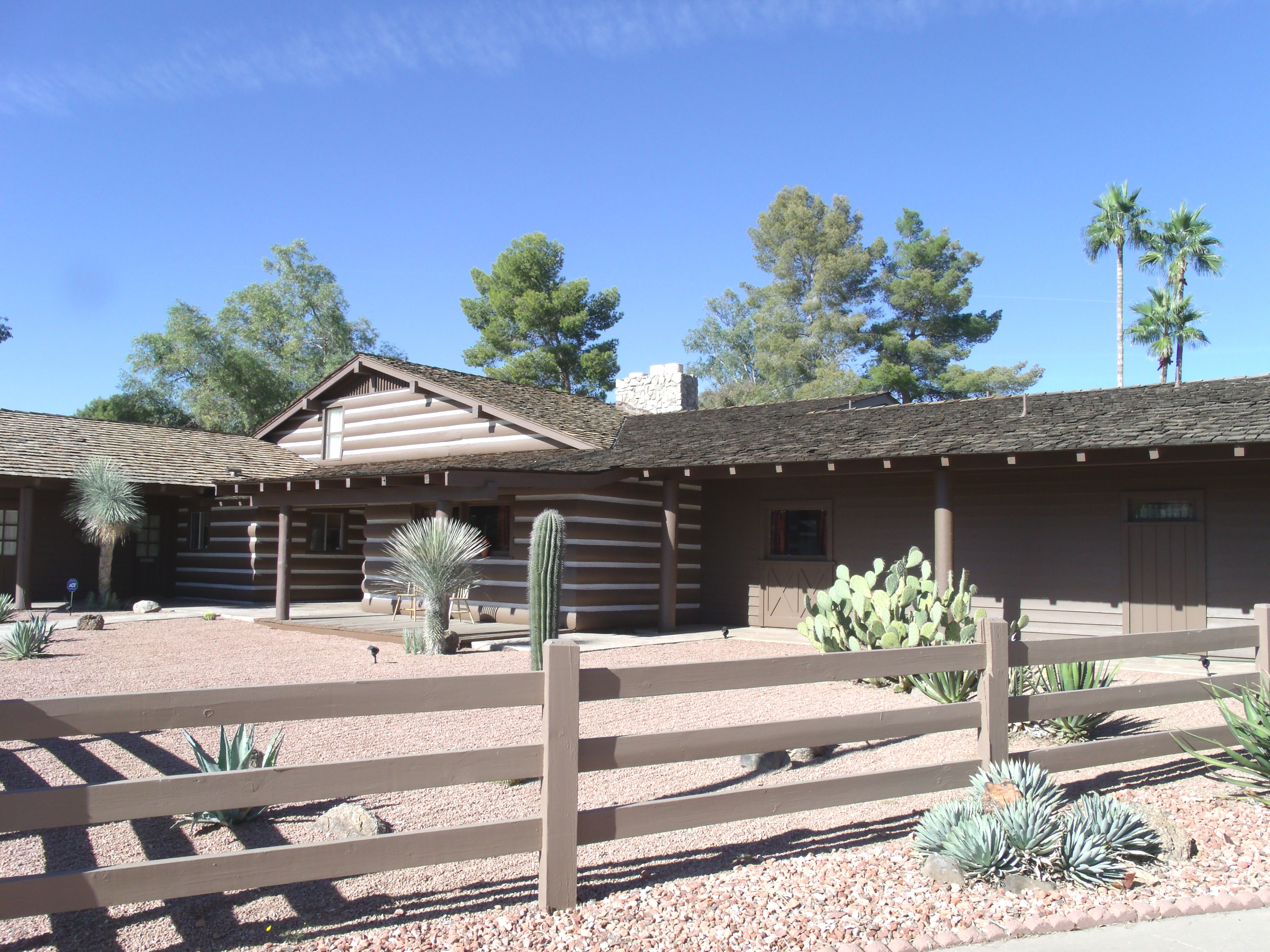
Different view of the Ponderosa II House.

=== Southern Pacific 2355 ===
The Southern Pacific (SP) 2355 was built in 1912 by Baldwin Locomotive Works. The heavy 4-6-0 "Ten Wheel" steam locomotive was retired from service in 1957. It is now on display at Mesa's Pioneer Park.

Southern Pacific Railroad #2355
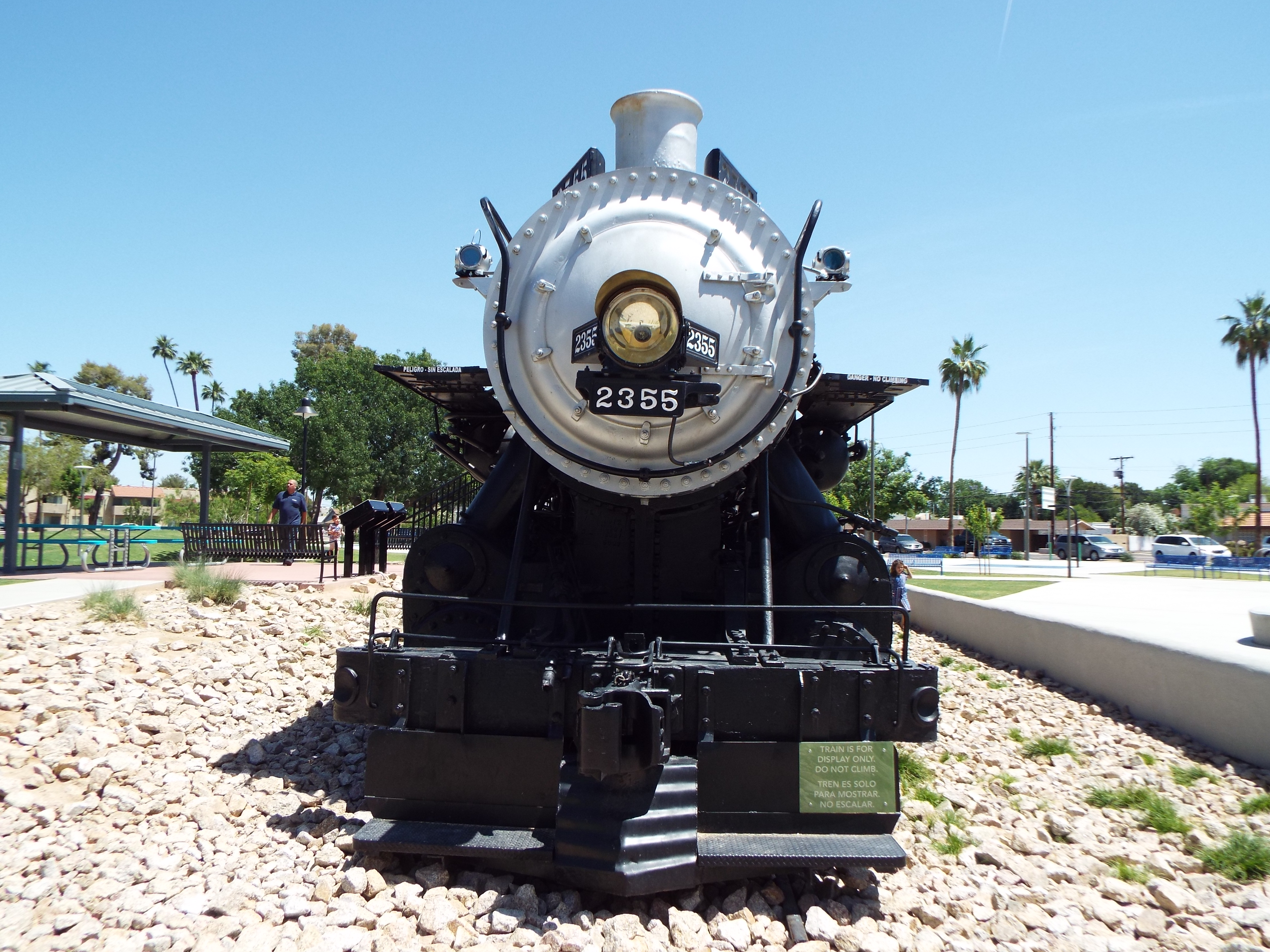
Front of the Southern Pacific 2355

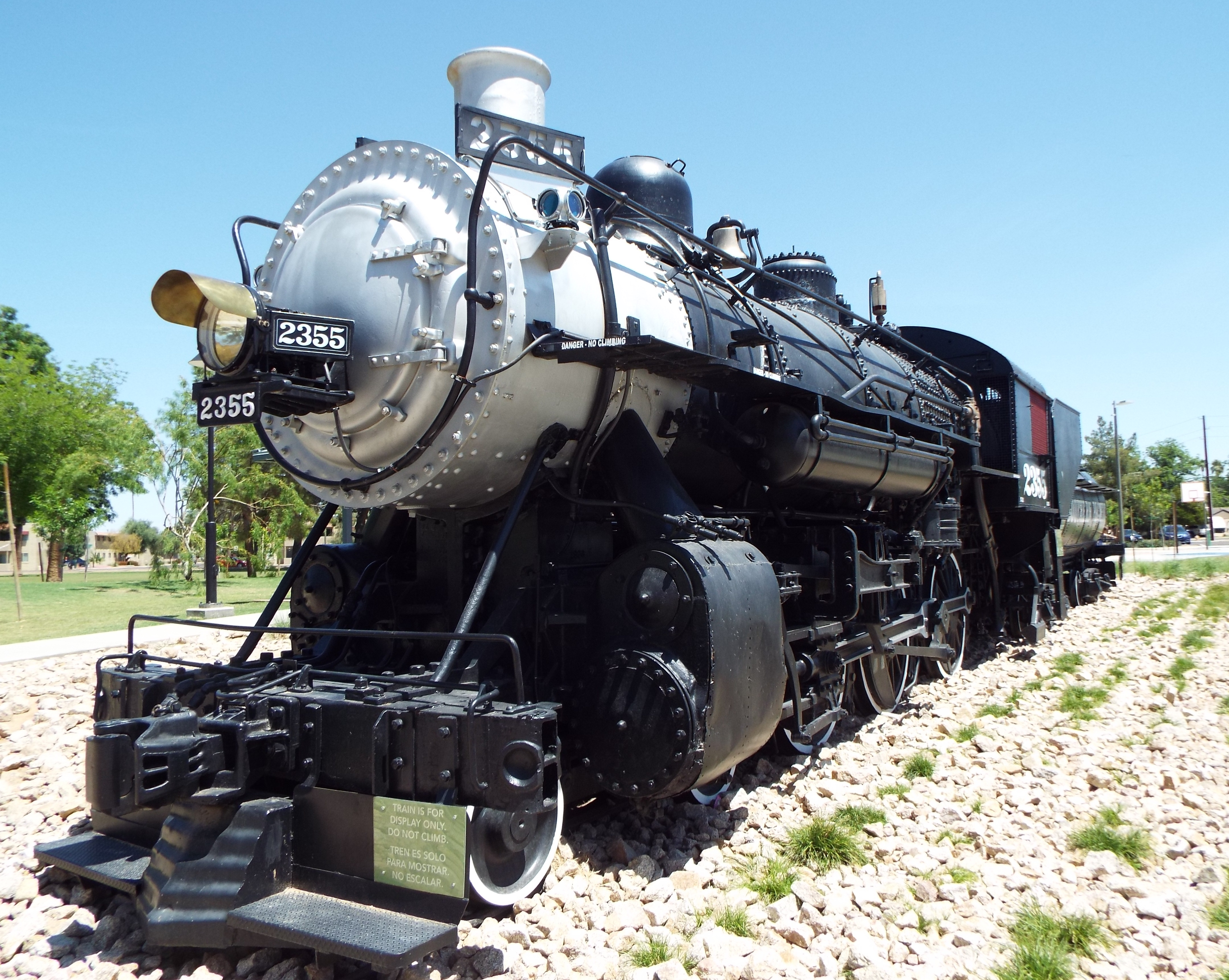
Southern Pacific 2355

== Williams Air Force Base ==
Williams Air Force Base is a former United States Air Force (USAF) base, located in the city of Mesa. It was active as a training base for both the United States Army Air Forces, as well as the USAF from 1941 until its closure in 1993. Williams was the leading pilot training facility of the USAF, supplying 25% of all pilots.

The following are the images of the remaining structures of the historic base with a brief description of the same.

- The Housing Storage Supply Warehouse at Williams Air Force Base (now Arizona State University at the Polytechnic campus). The housing supply warehouse was constructed in December 1941 by Del E. Webb Construction Company. The housing supply warehouse is significant for its association with the initial development and construction at Williams Air Force Base. Listed in the National Register of Historic Places – 1995. Reference 95000746.
- The Water Tower at Williams Air Force Base (now Arizona State University at the Polytechnic campus). The water tower was constructed in the winter of 1941–1942 by the Del E. Webb Construction Company. The water tower possesses the associative quality that connects it to the history of Williams Air Force Base. Listed in the National Register of Historic Places – 1995. Reference 95000745
- The Flagpole was built in December 1941, the Base Flagpole is significant as an object for its important symbolic and traditional associations with the origins and history of Williams Air Force Base. The pole was erected by Del E. Webb Construction Company. Listed in the National Register of Historic Places – 1995 Reference 95000744.
- The Demountable Hangar is located at the North Apron. Built in 1925 and designed by Webb, Del E., Construction Company to resemble an enlisted aviator badge of the Army Air Force. Listed on the National Register of Historic Places in 1995, ref. #95000743.
- The Ammo Bunker (S-1007) is located Southwest of Vosler Dr. (formerly Alaska Dr.), at Arizona State University at the Polytechnic campus . Built in 1925 by Webb, Del E., Construction Company. Listed in the National Register of Historic Places ref: 95000748.
- The Ammo Bunker (S-1008) also located Southwest of Vosler Dr. (formerly Alaska Dr.). Built in 1925 by Webb, Del E., Construction Company. Listed in the National Register of Historic Places ref: 95000759.
- The Civil Engineering Maintenance Shop also known as S-735, located in Unity Ave. (Jct. of 11th and A Sts.), at Arizona State University at the Polytechnic campus (Formally Williams AFB), Mesa, Arizona. Listed in the National Register of Historic Places in 1995, ref: #95000747.
Williams Air Force Base
(now part of Phoenix–Mesa Gateway Airport)
(NRHP = National Register of Historic Places)
(MHP = Mesa Historic Properties)
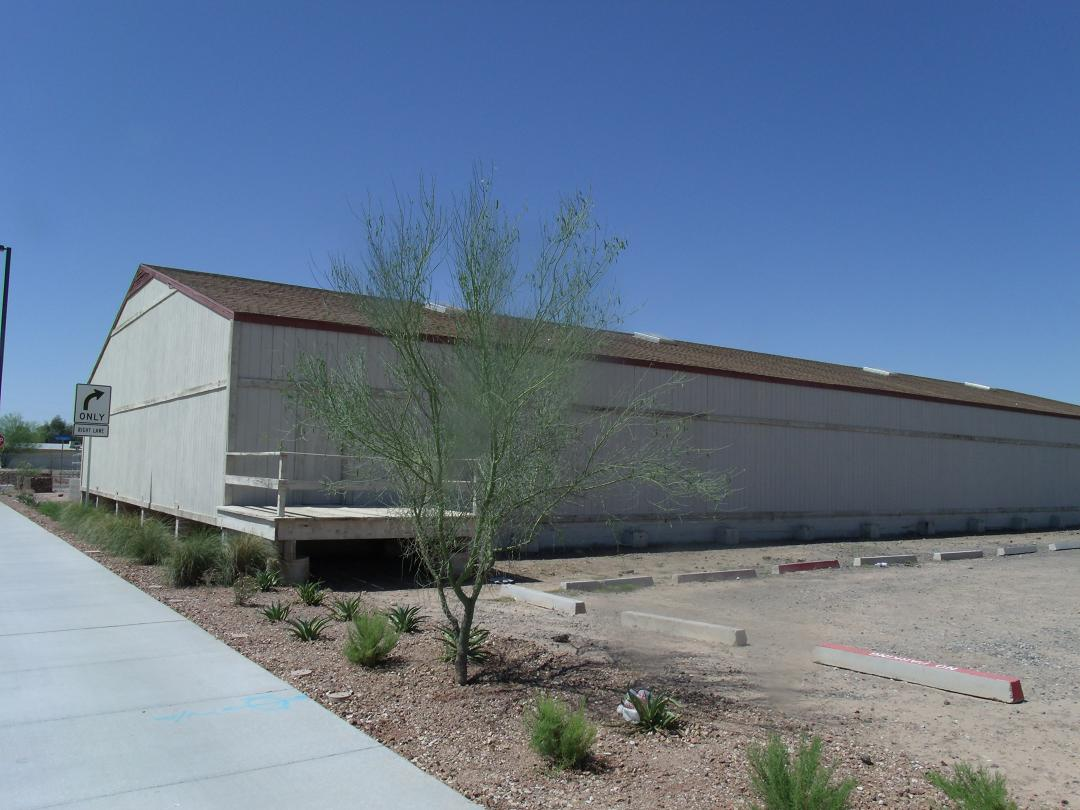
The Housing Storage Supply Warehouse.

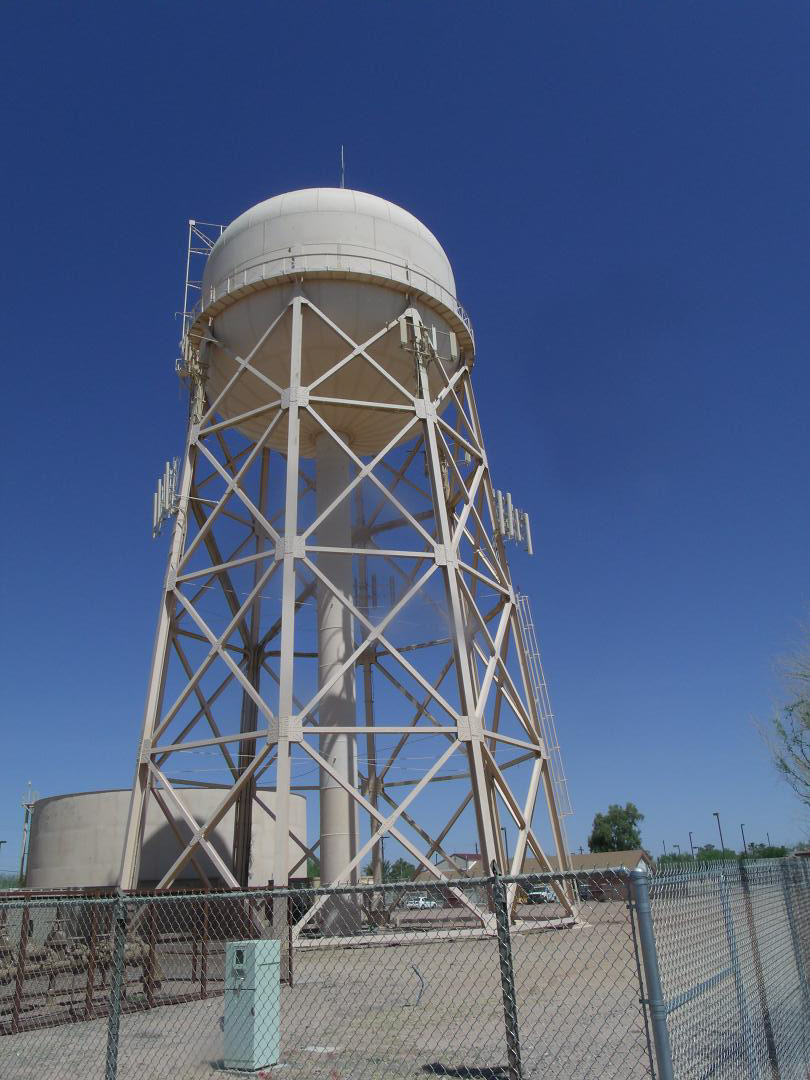
The Water Tower.

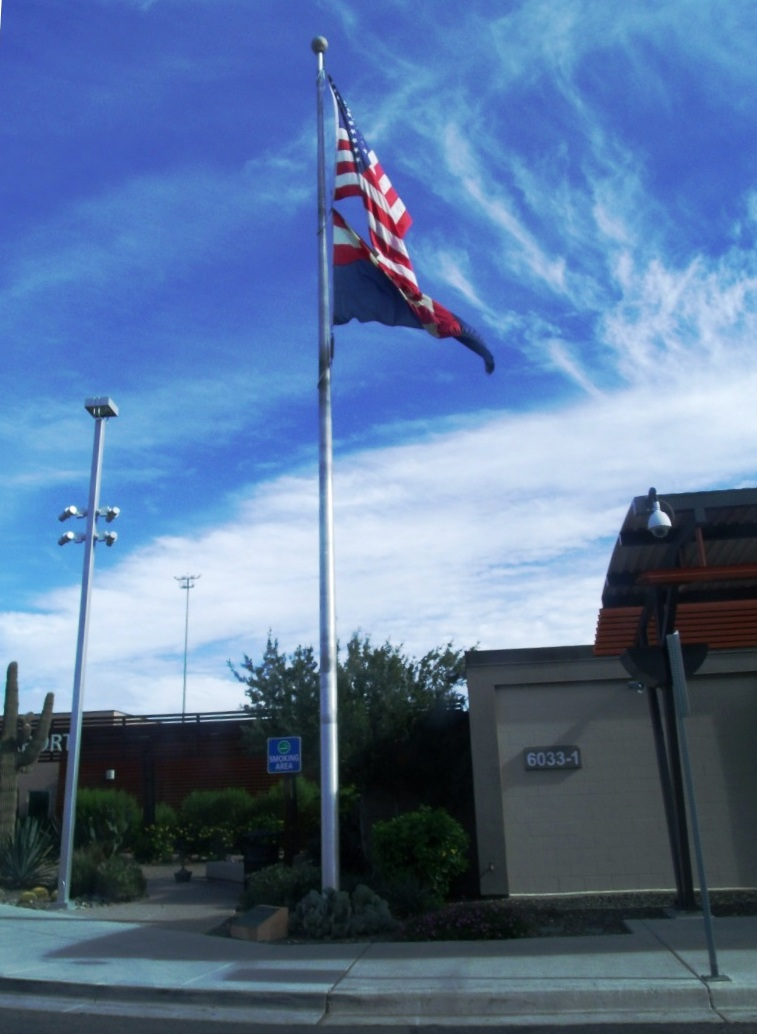
The Flagpole.

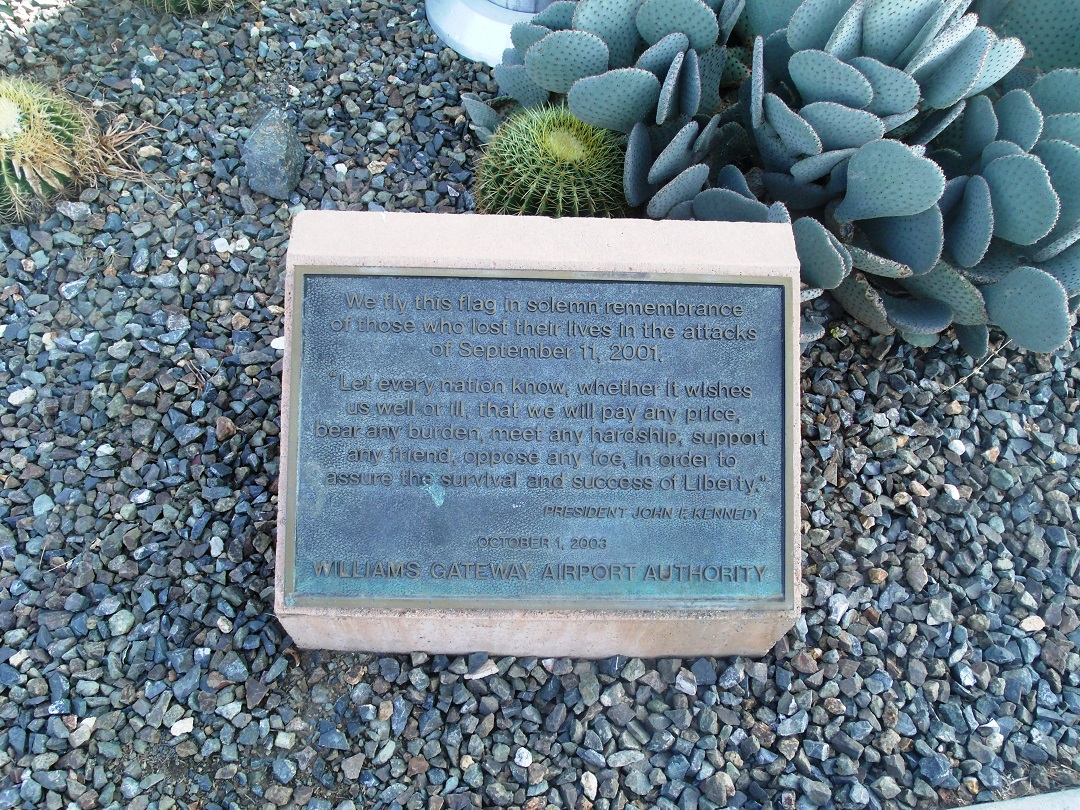
Flagpole Marker.

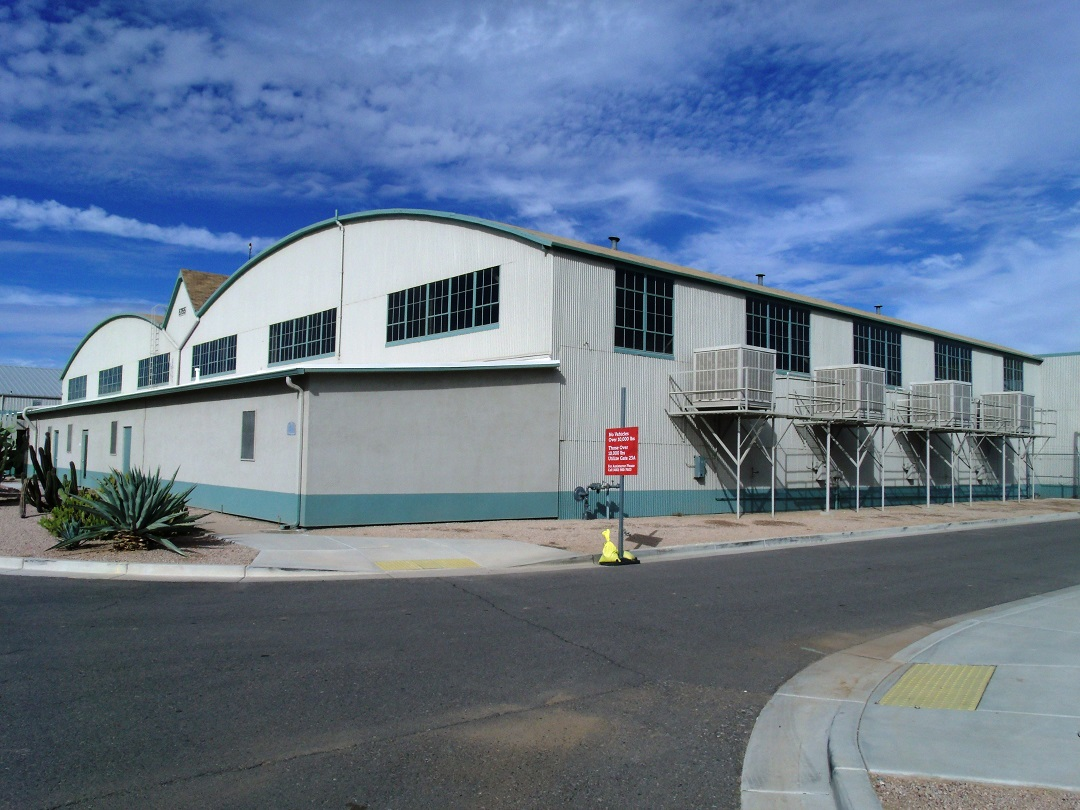
The Demountable Hangar.

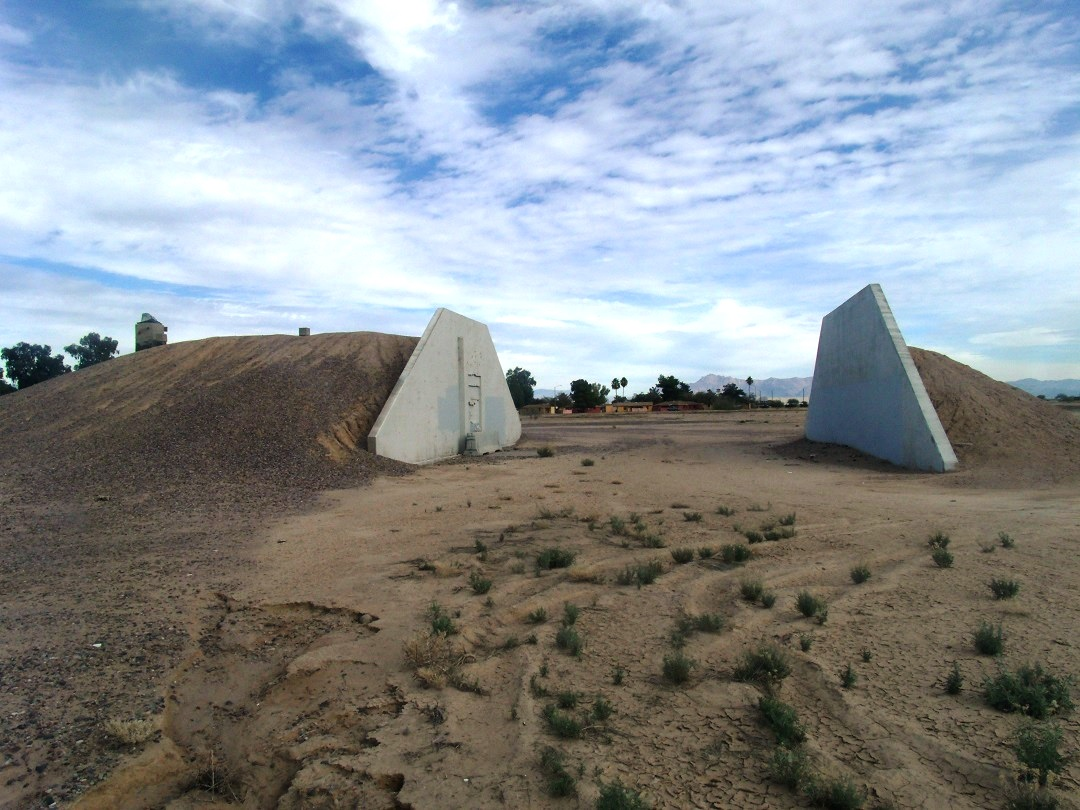
The Ammo Bunker (S-1007).

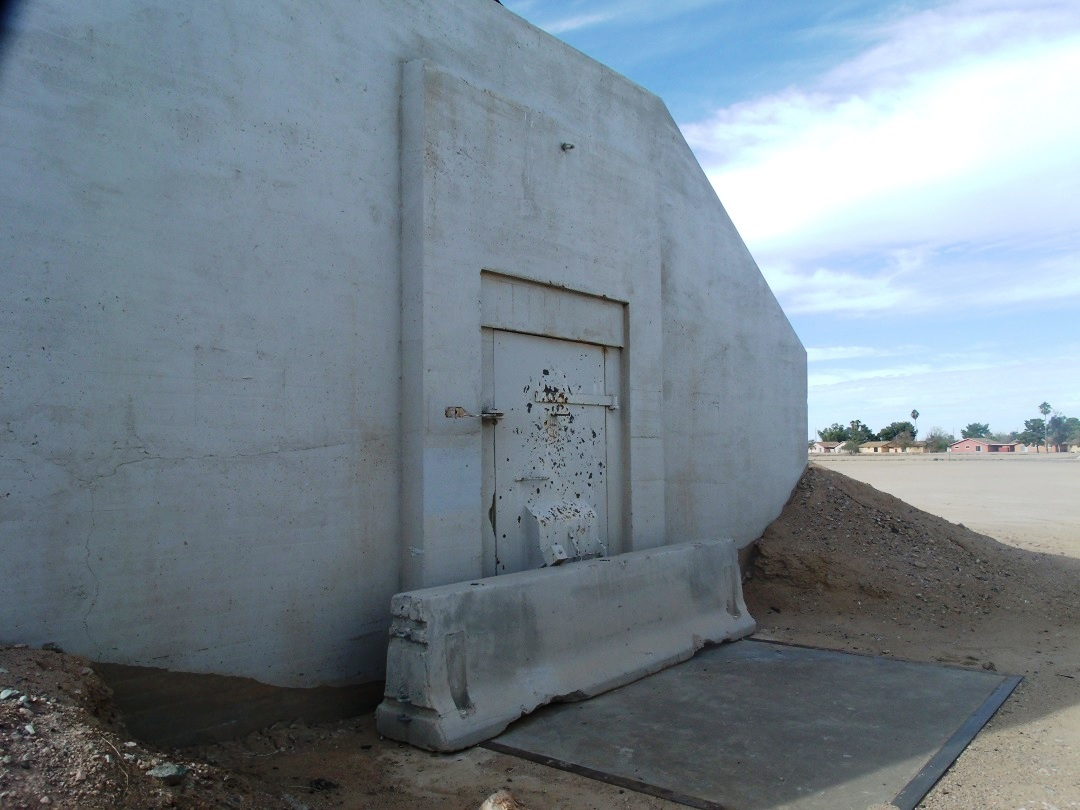
Sealed entrance of Ammo Bunker (S-1007).

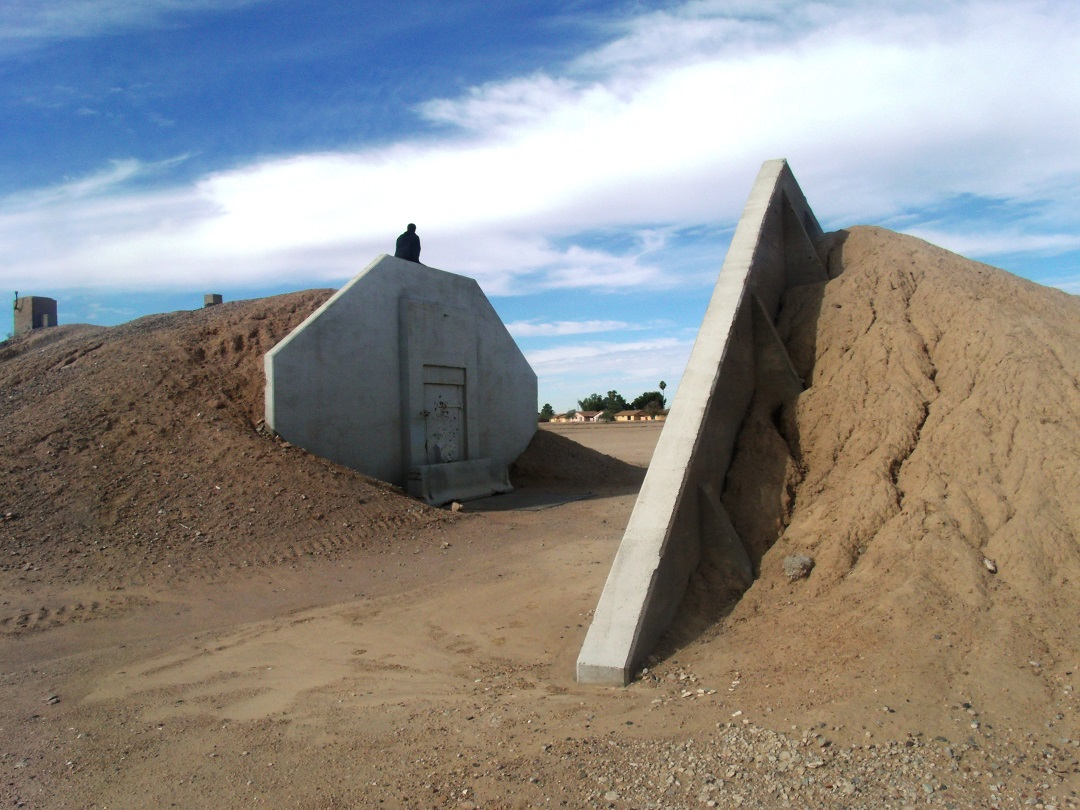
The Ammo Bunker (S-1008).

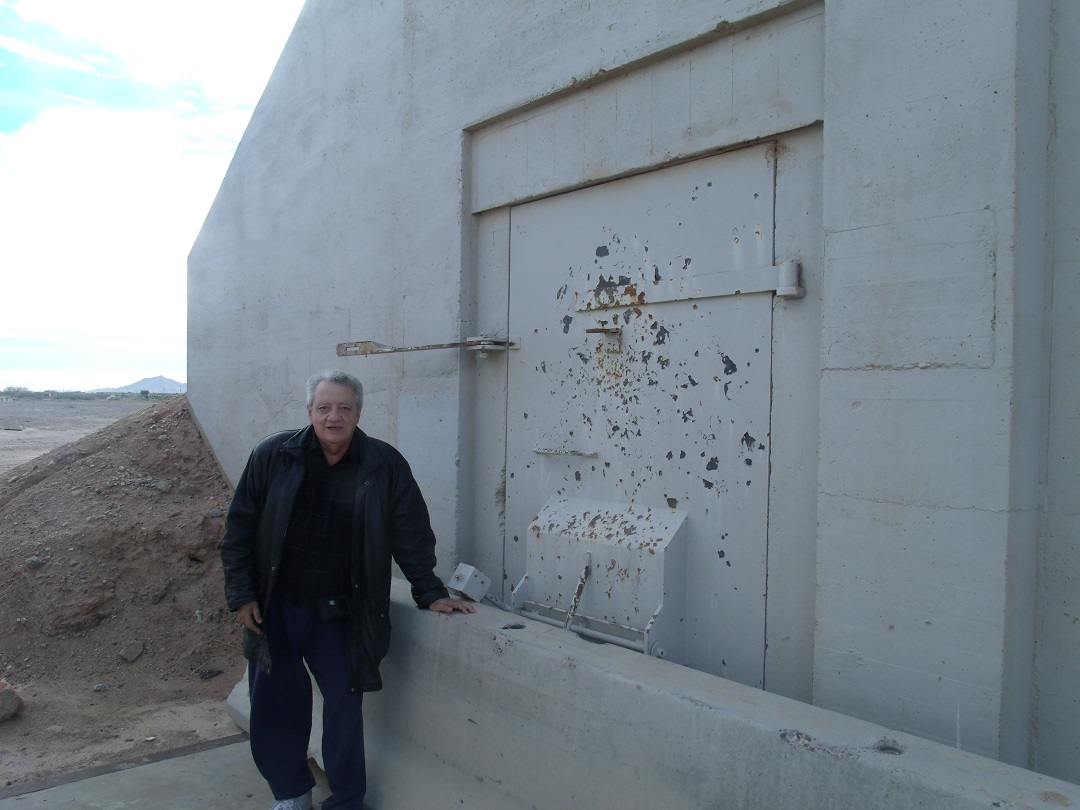
Sealed entrance of Ammo Bunker (S-1008).

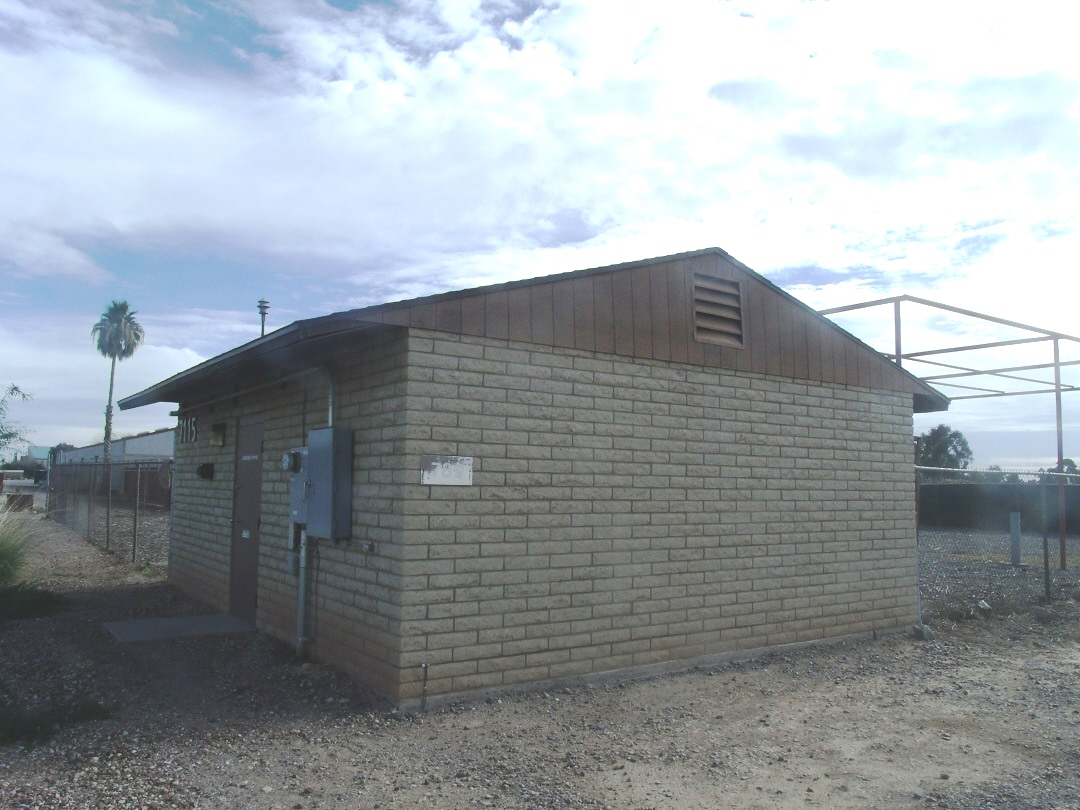
The Civil Engineering Maintenance Shop.

== Arizona Commemorative Air Force Museum ==
The Arizona Commemorative Air Force Museum, a.k.a. Airbase Arizona Aircraft Museum, was established in 1978, in Falcon Field in Mesa, Arizona. It is the 10th unit of the Commemorative Air Force and the home of one of the largest Commemorative Air Force units in the world. On exhibit are World War II artifacts, helicopters and classic American and foreign combat planes, many of which are the last remaining warbirds of their kinds. The propeller in frint of the building is one of four which was installed on a B-29 Super Fortress.

Among the historic aircraft's and artifacts pictured are the following:

- Douglas C-47 Skytrain, which served with the 11th Troop Carrier Squadron. This aircraft flew highly classified missions transporting spies and supplies and rescuing wounded and refugees. This actual aircraft's missions were lost to history for 70 years. "Old Number 30" is named after a mule, serial number 30, that was one of four mules flown along with four partisan commandos in the dead of night from Brindisi, Italy to a top-secret site in the Balkans in 1944. Mule #30, along with 35 other mules hauled twelve 75-mm guns through the mountains to attack Nazi occupiers.
- Beechcraft C-45 Expeditor
- Douglas A-26C Invader named Miss Murphy Serial #: 44–35601. Built by Douglas Aircraft Company in 1942, during World War II. This aircraft also participated in the Korean and Vietnam wars
- Douglas SBD Dauntless The aircraft is in Mechanics Hangar for restoration.
- Lee-Wray Nieuport 17 (N124RX/1). Serial Number 251, this was a French fighter plane manufactured by Michael P. Wray and Company during World War I. It is currently in the Mechanics Hangar.
- McDonnell Douglas F-4N Phantom II
- Mikoyan-Gurevich MiG-21
- Nieuport 28 C.1, a replica of the French biplane fighter aircraft flown by American Ace Eddie Rickenbacker during World War I.
- Lockheed PV-2 Harpoon (N86492/492/BJ-K)
- North American B-25 Mitchell named Maid in the Shade. This aircraft is one of 34 B-25Js still flying. This aircraft was used in America's first large-scale bombing offensive in the Philippines, sinking 8 ships and shooting down 5 planes. This aircraft is in the Mechanics Hangar.
- Grumman TBF Avenger
- North American P-51 Mustang originally named Dazzling Donna. Serial #: 44–74404. was repainted in June 2006, with then name of Stang for the movie "Thunder Over Reno".
- Bell UH-1B Iroquois
- Sikorsky H-19 Chickasaw (company model number S-55)
- Royal Aircraft Factory S.E.5
Arizona Commemorative Air Force Museum

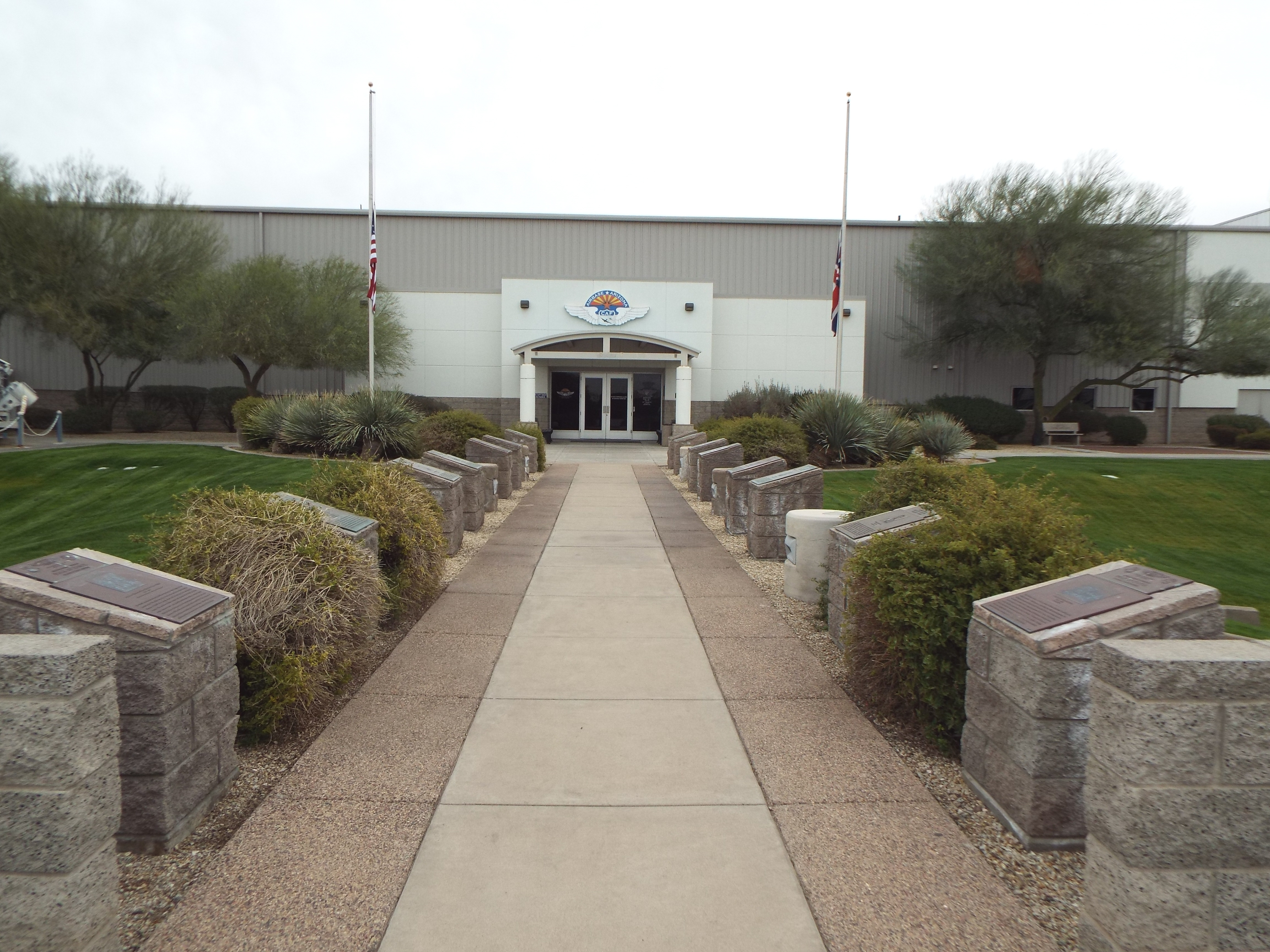
Arizona Commemorative Air Force Museum and Walk of Honor

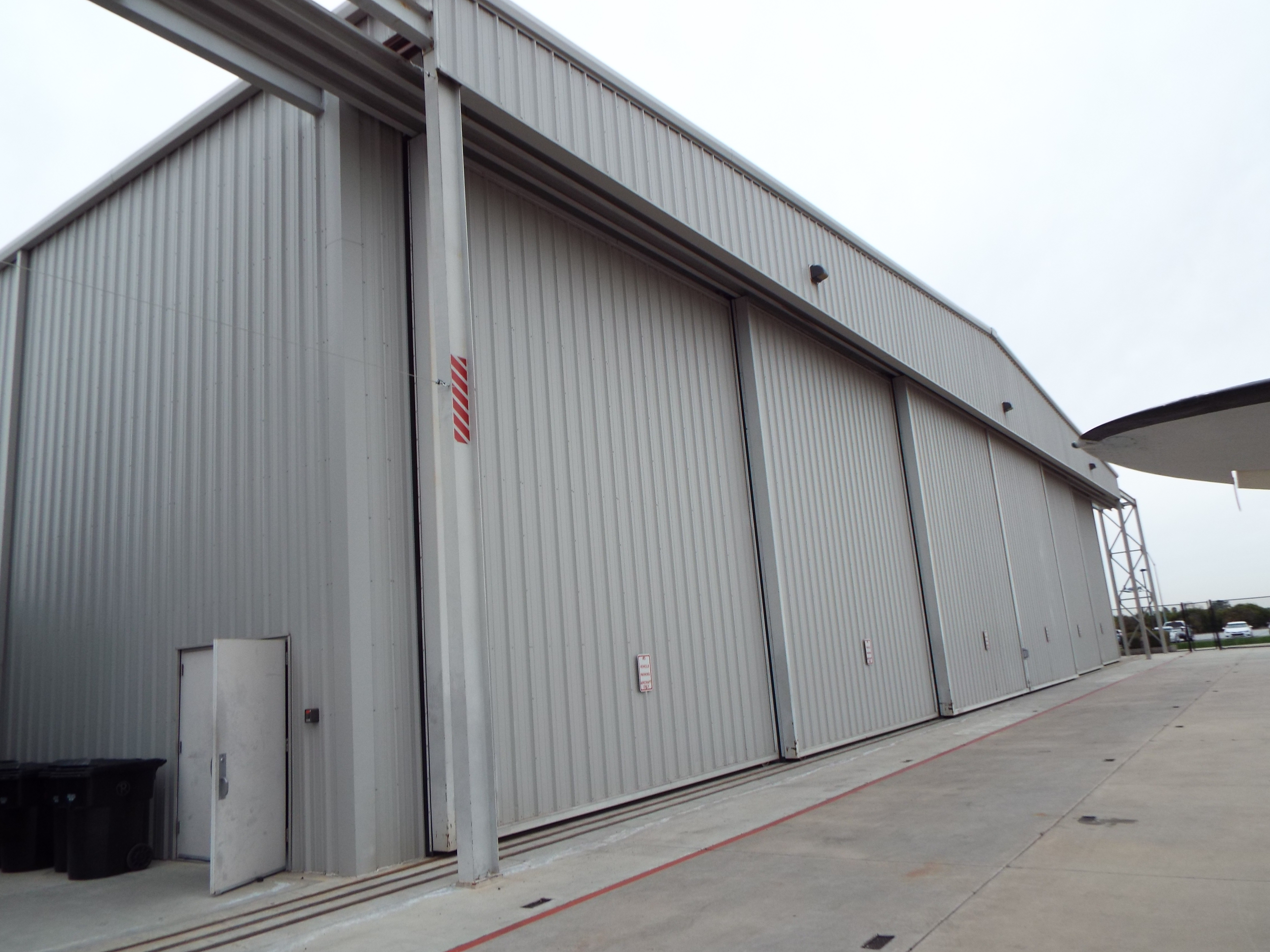
World War II hangar

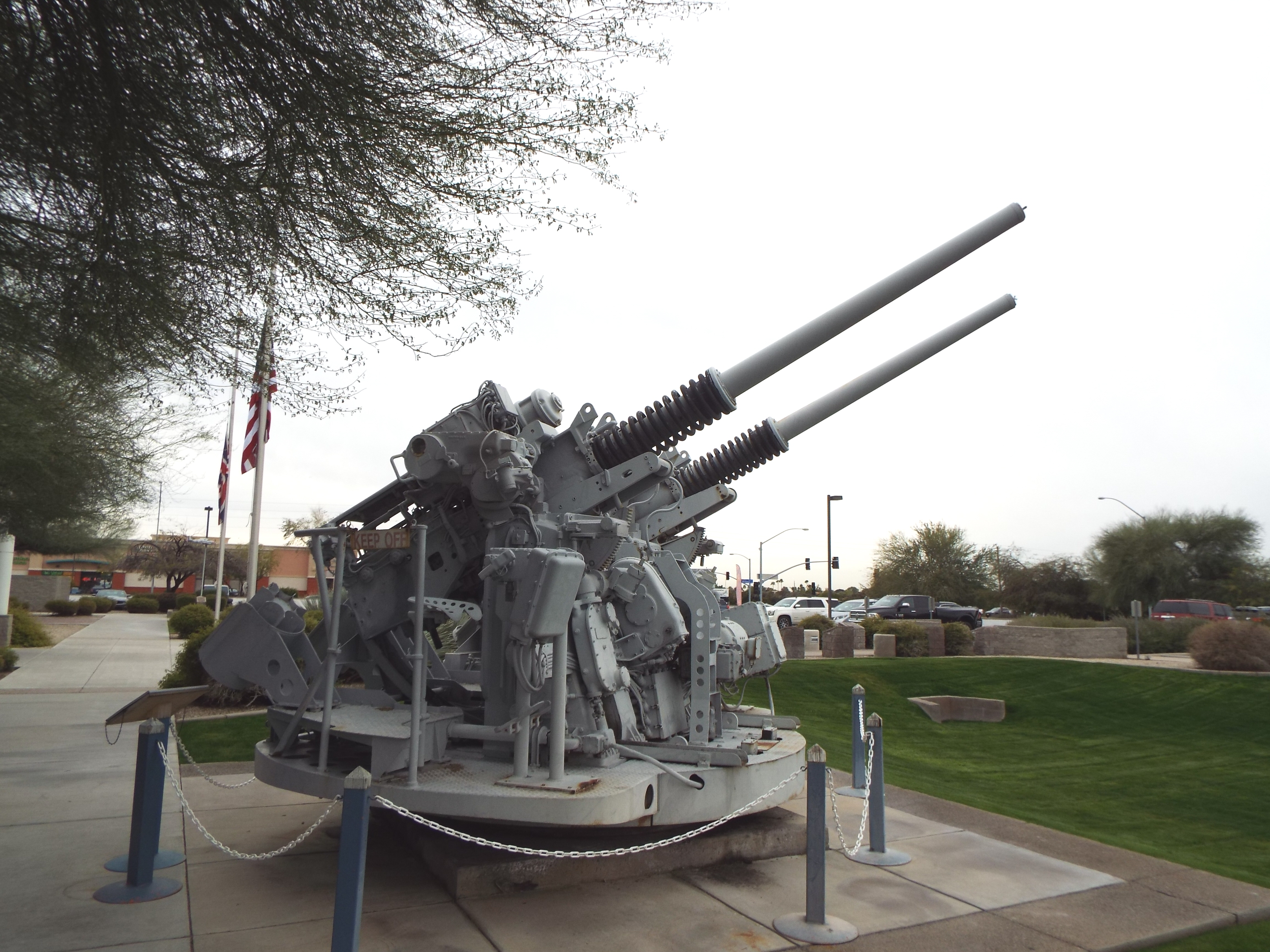
3-inch Mark 33 deck gun

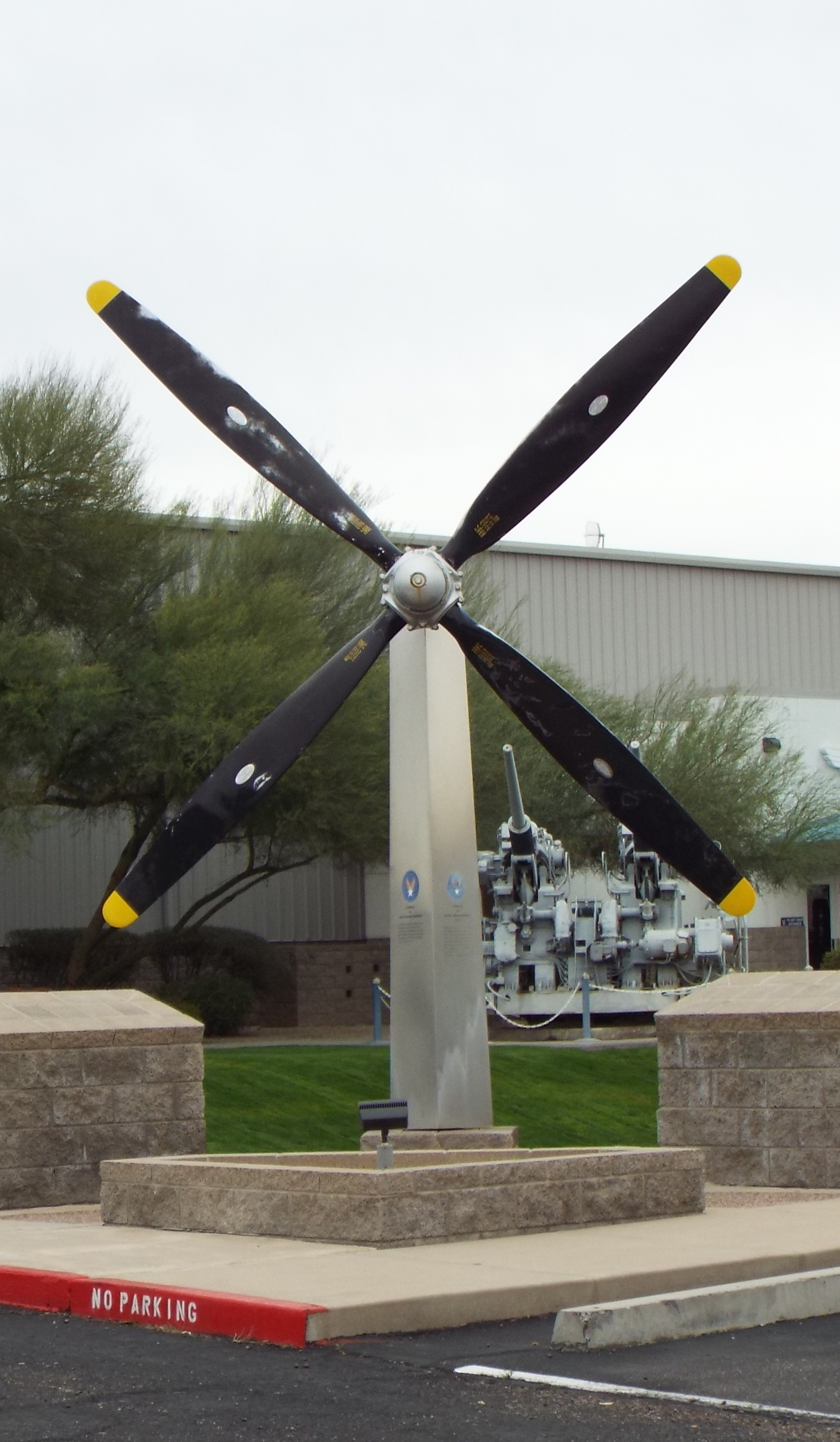
Arizona Commemorative Air Force Museum

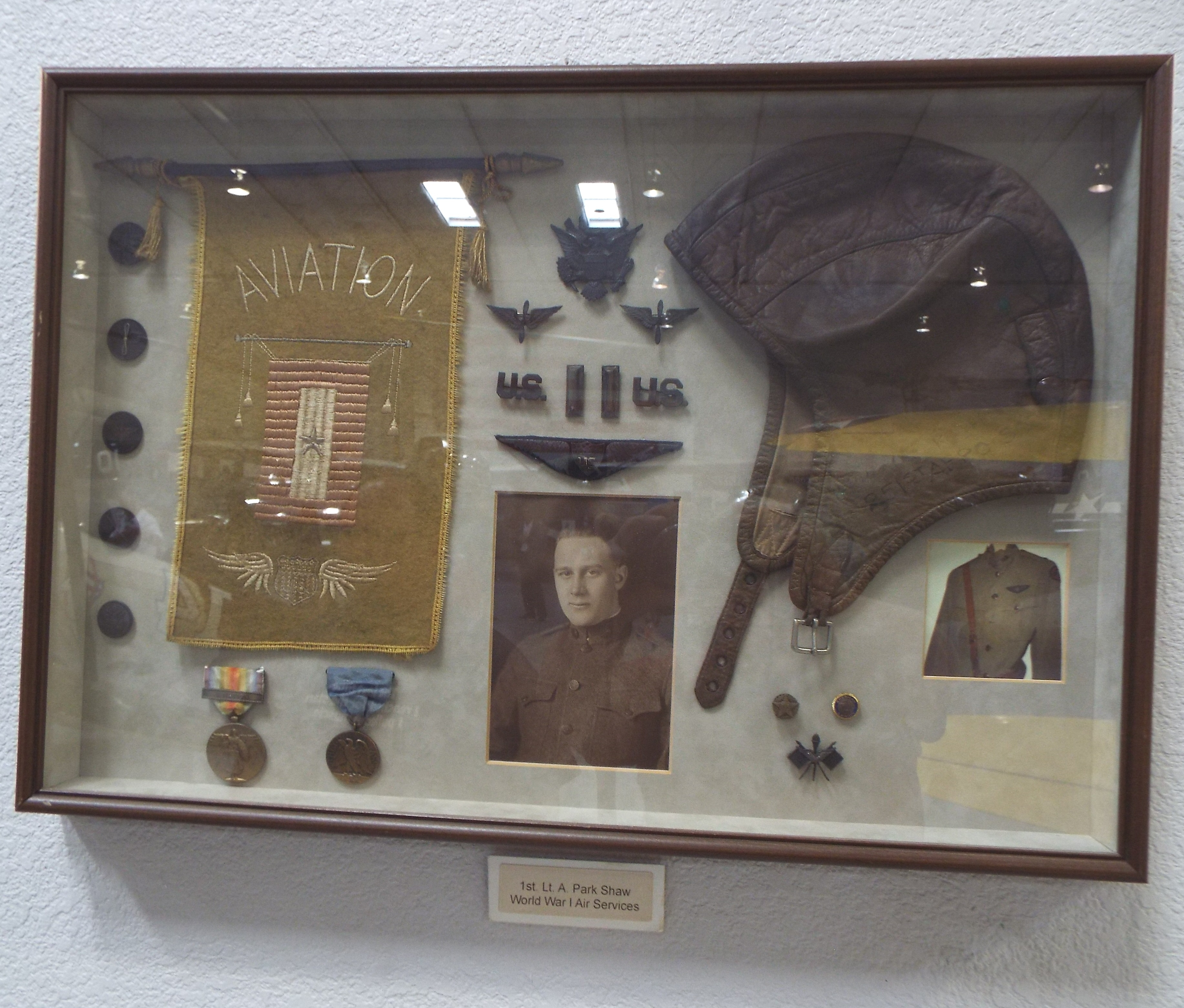
Lt. A. Park Shaw exhibit

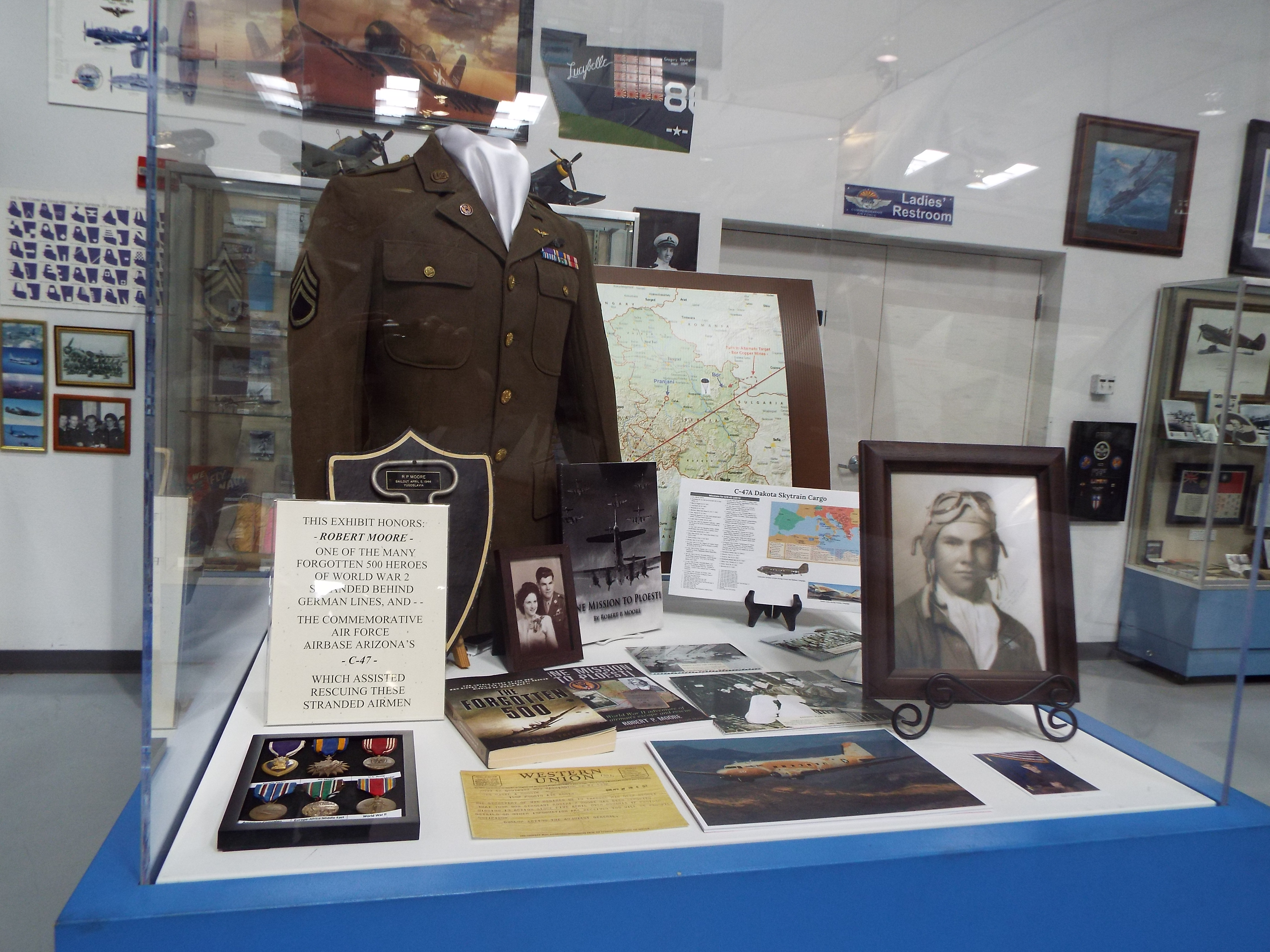
Col. Robert P. Moore exhibit

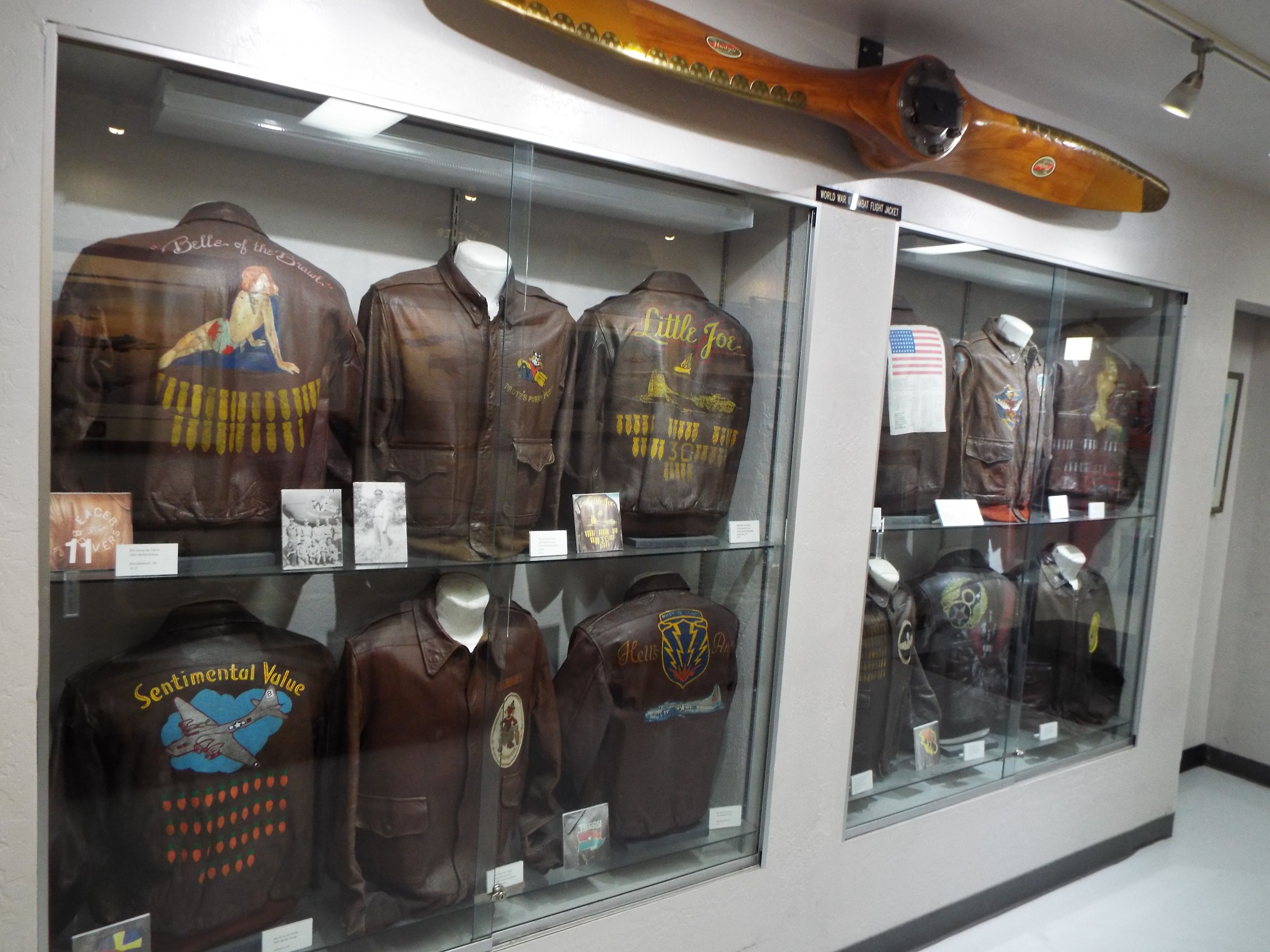
World War II aviators jackets

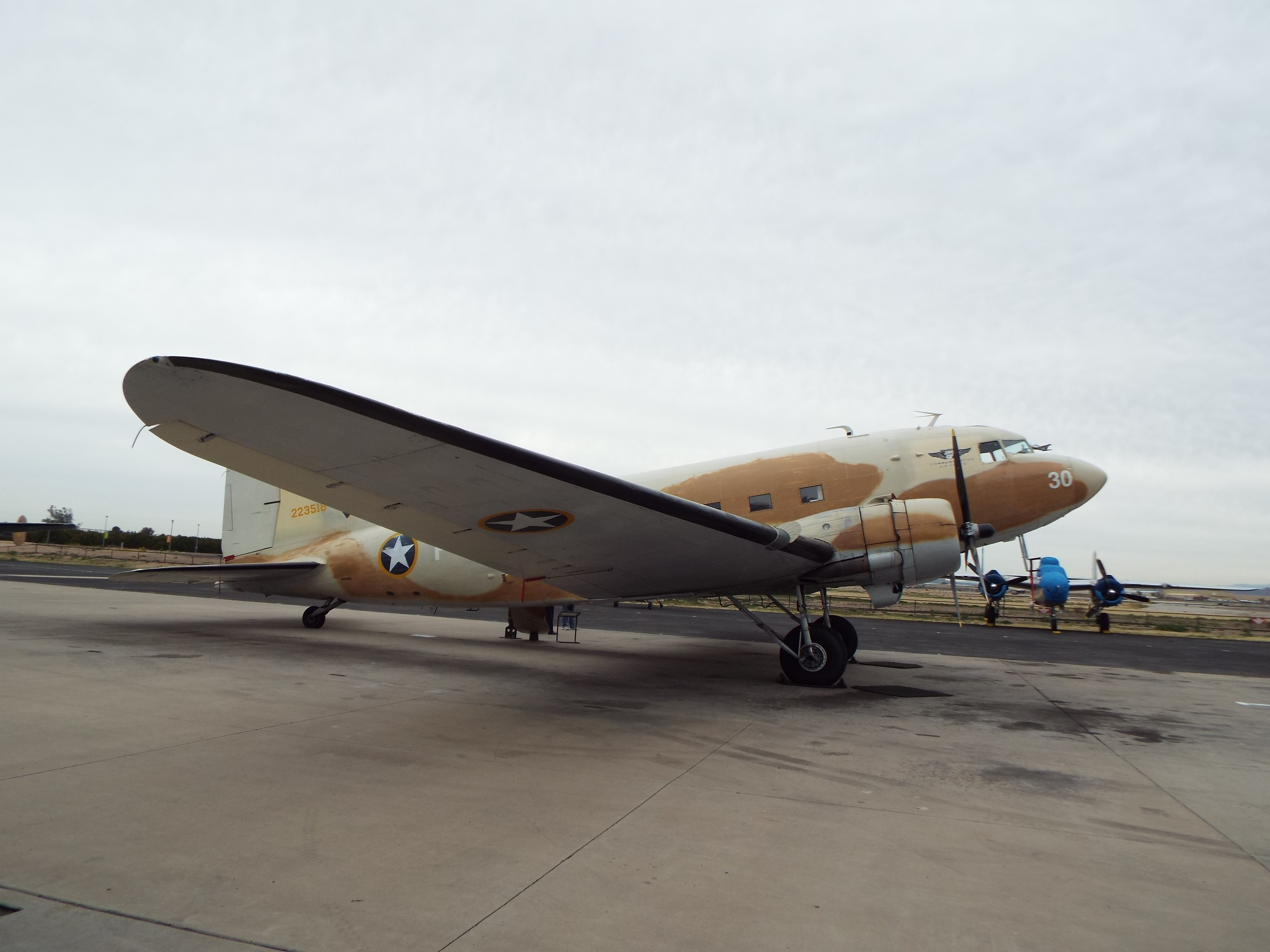
Douglas C-47 Skytrain Dakota "Old Number 30"

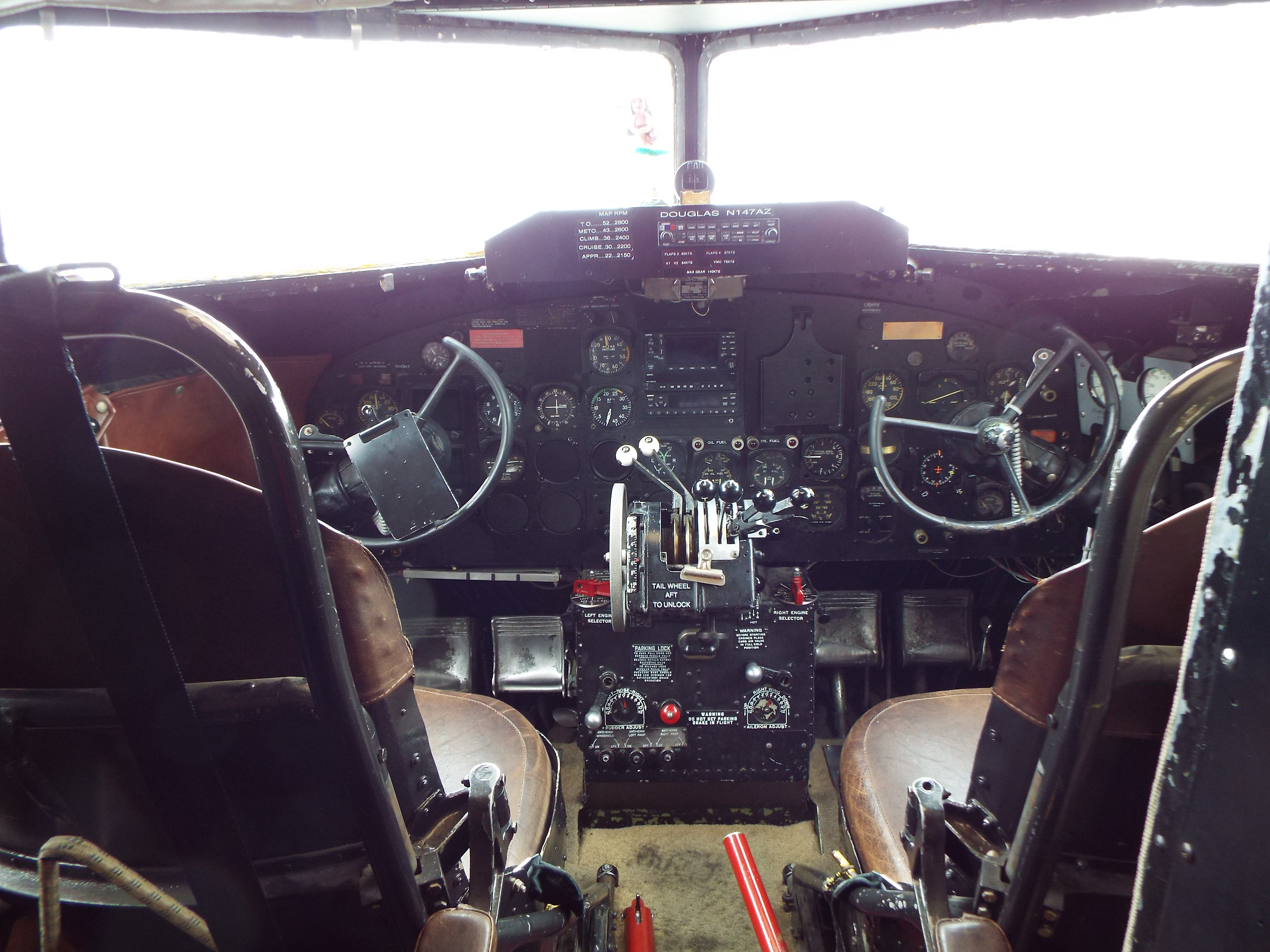
C-47 Skytrain cockpit

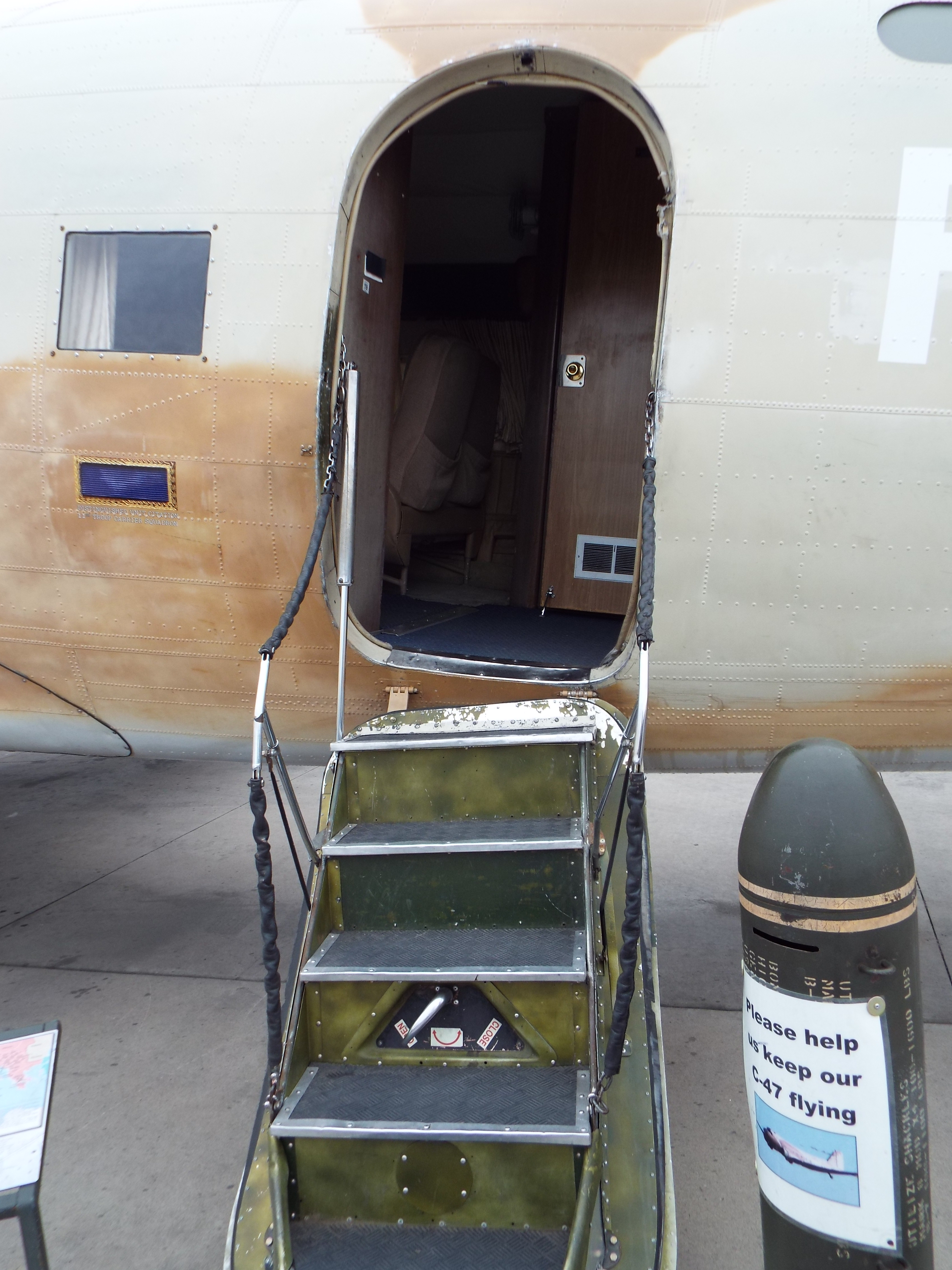
Douglas C-47 Skytrain Dakota door "Old Number 30"

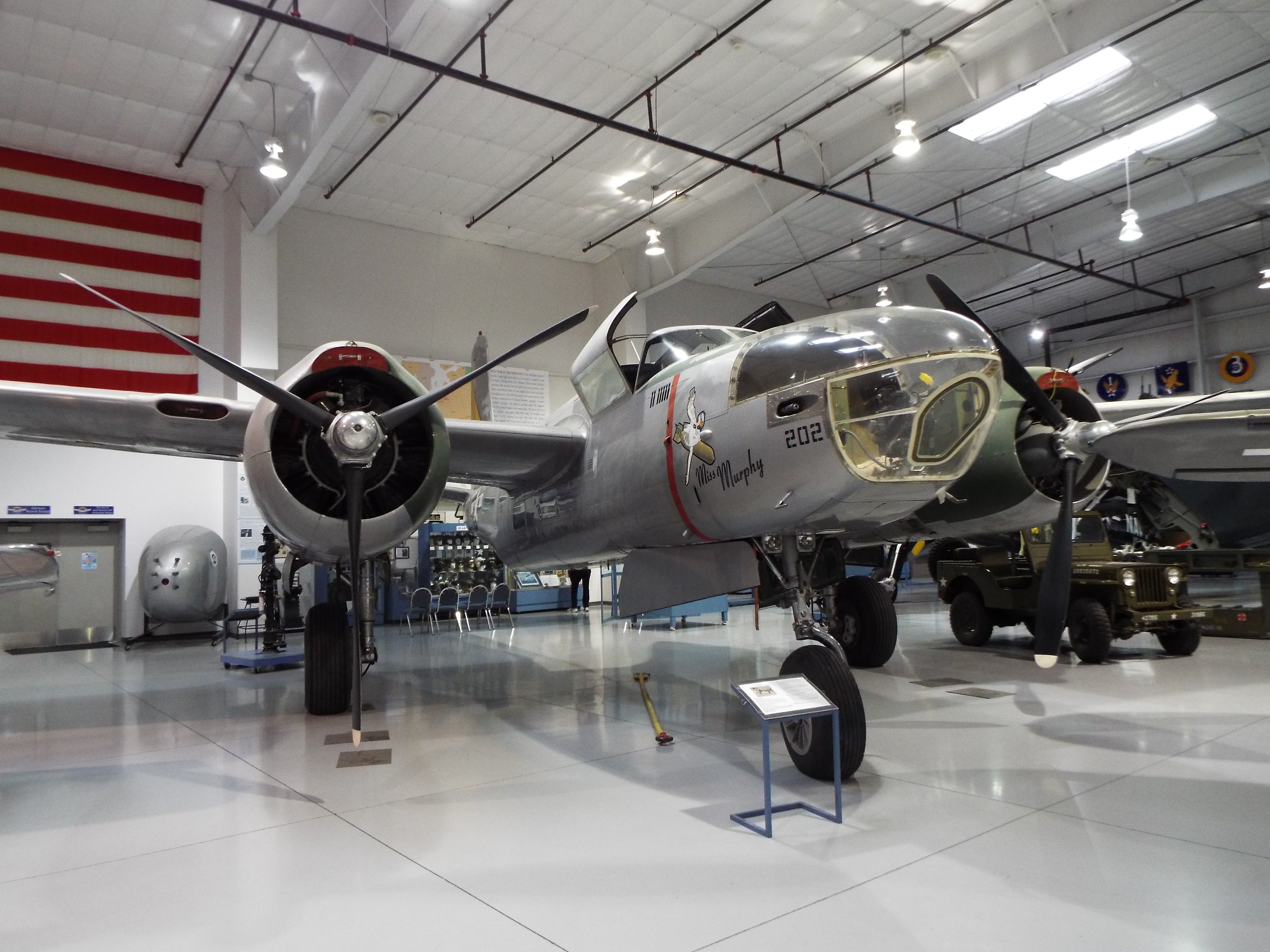
Douglas A-26C Invader "Miss Murphy"

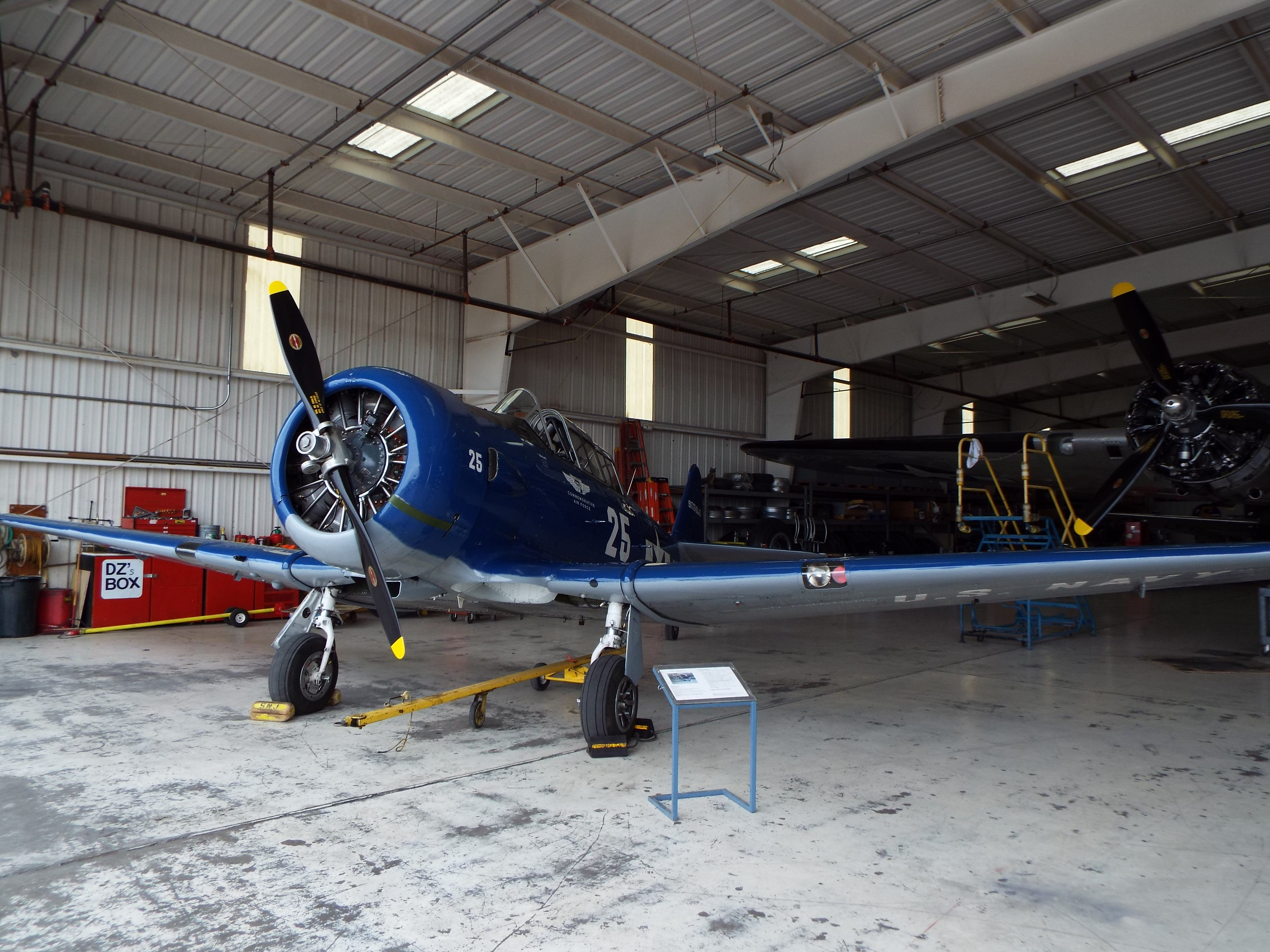
North American T-6 Texan in the Mechanics Hangar

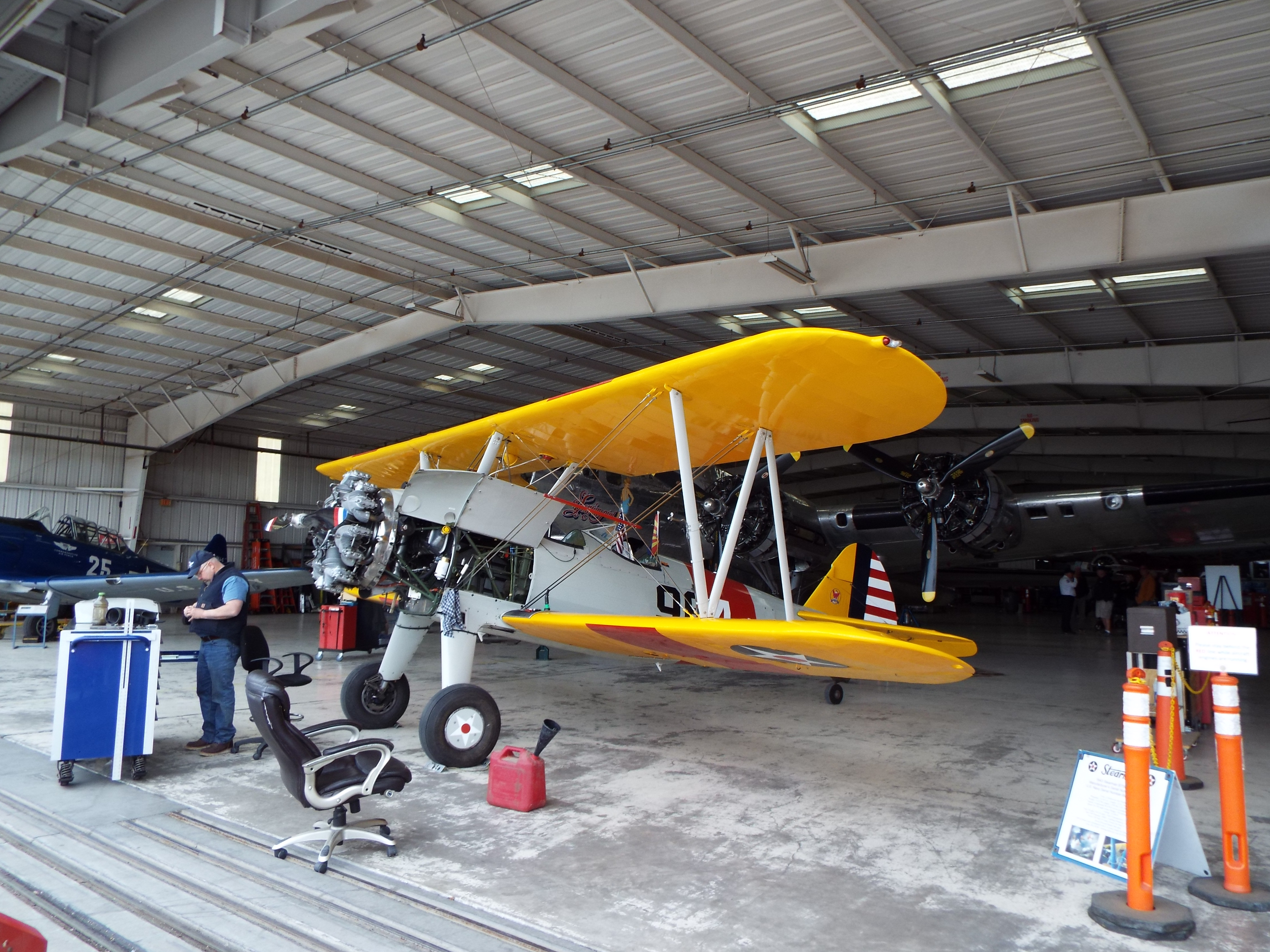
Boeing Stearman in the Mechanics Hangar.

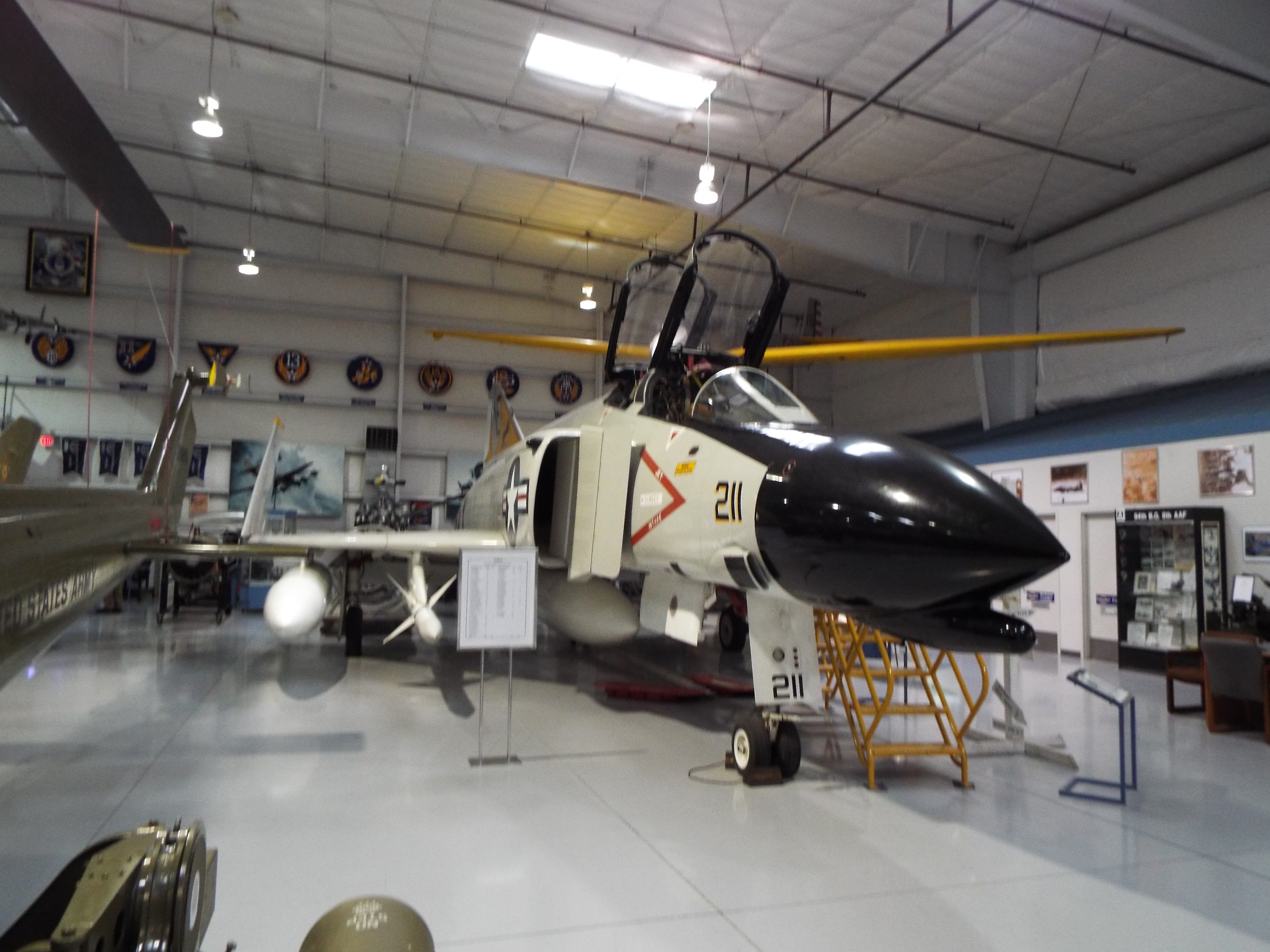
McDonnell Douglas F-4N Phantom II

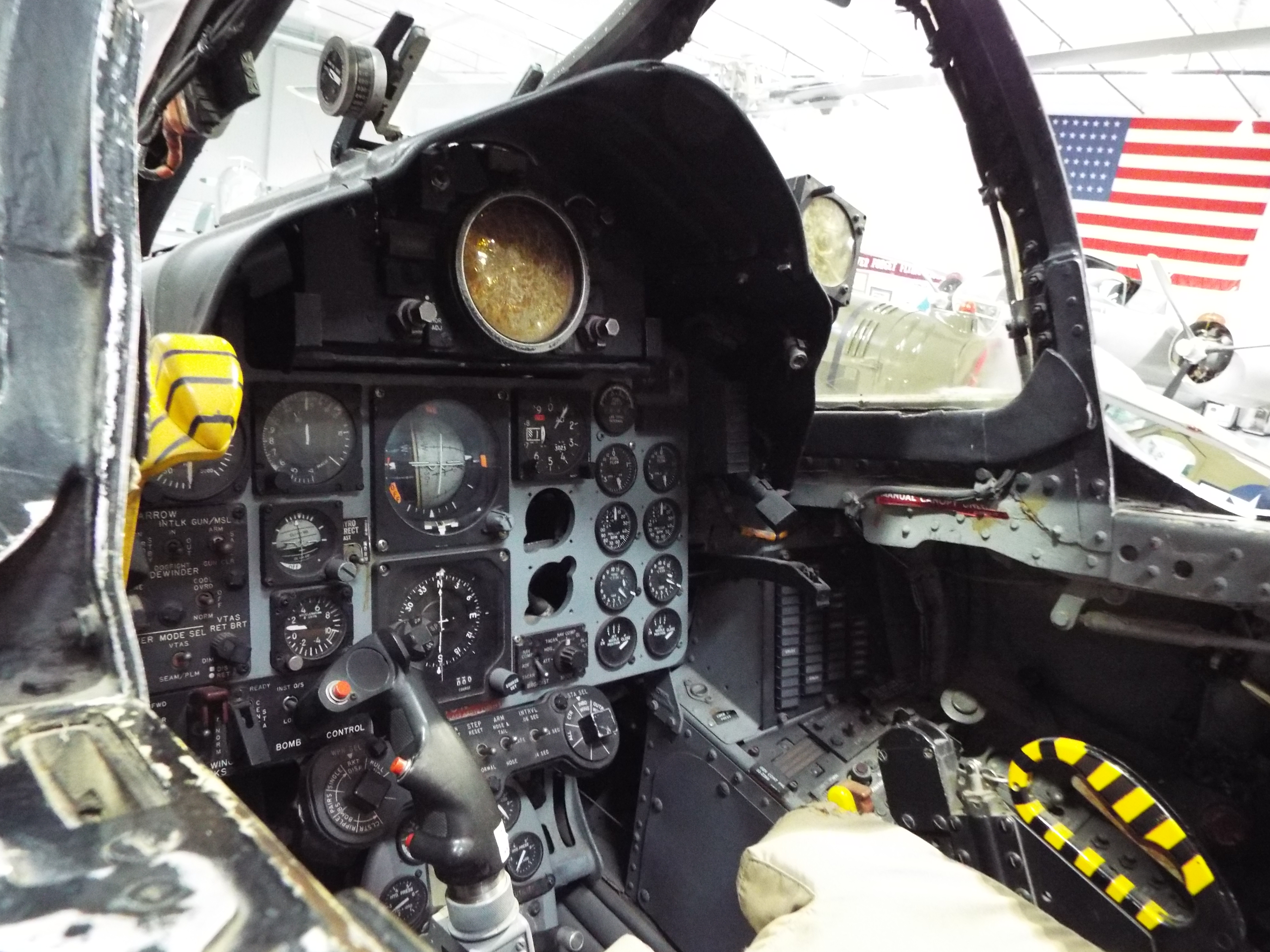
McDonnell Douglas F-4N Phantom II cockpit

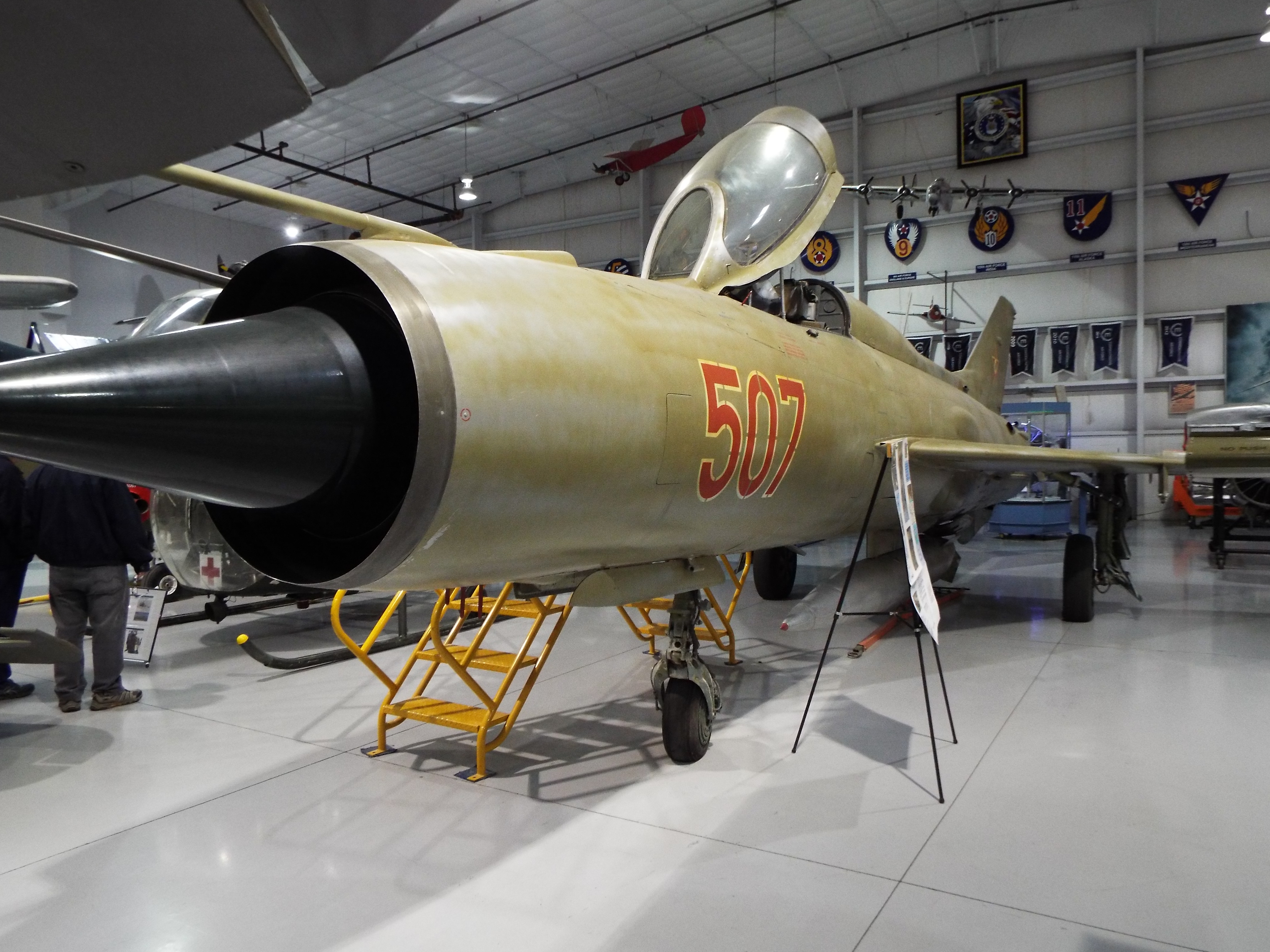
Hungarian MiG-21 PF

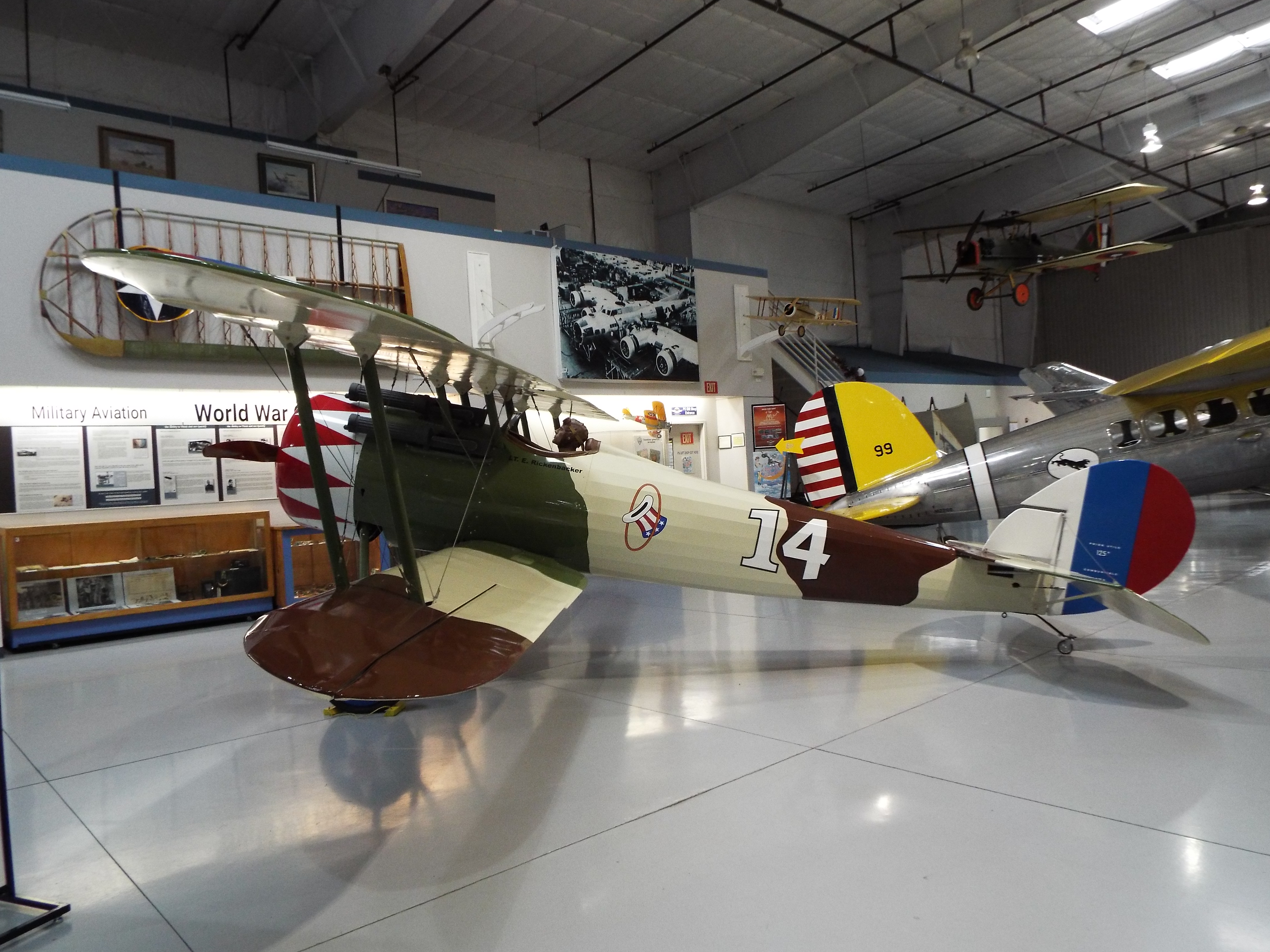
Nieuport 28 C.1

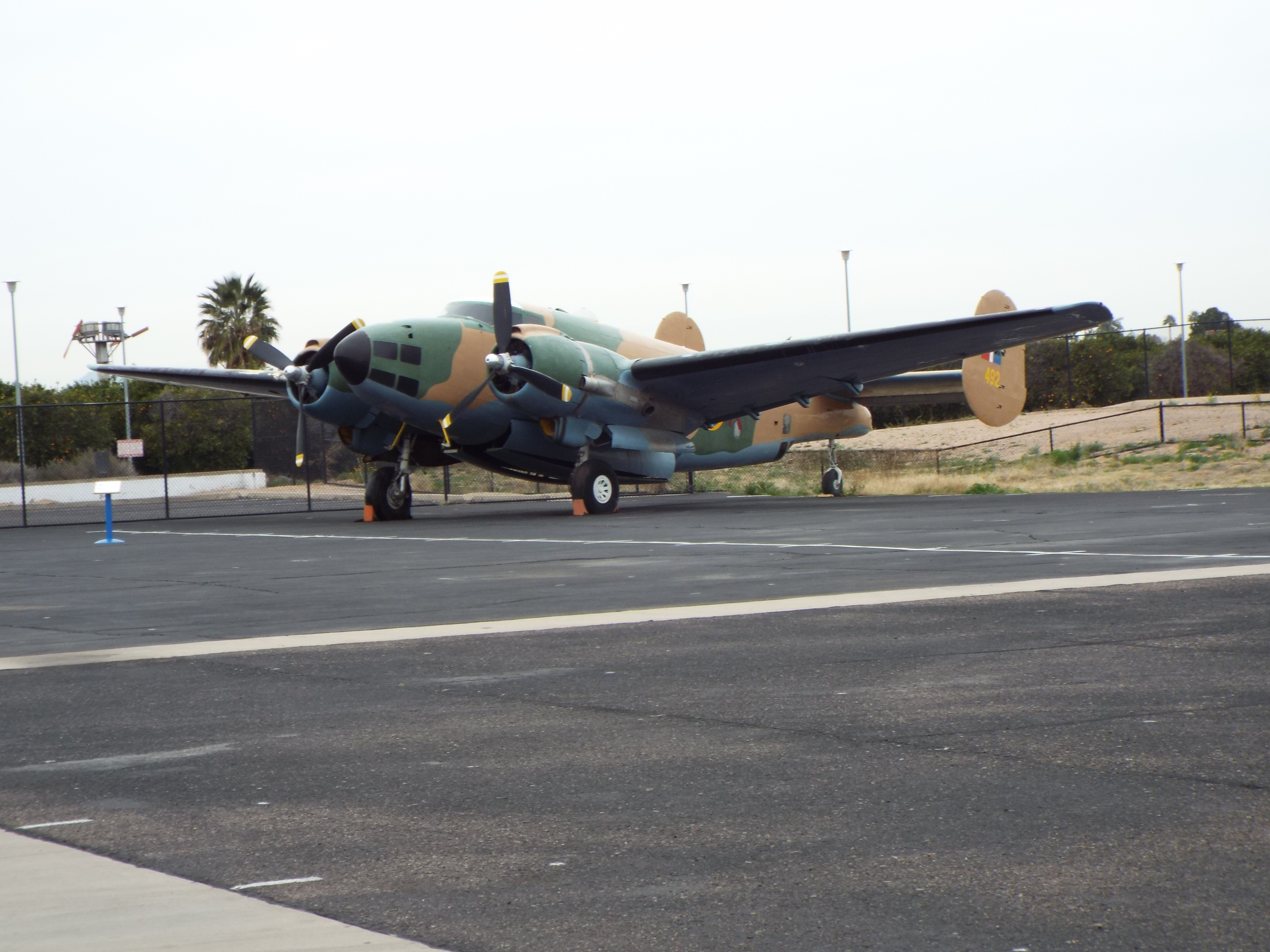
Lockheed PV-2 Harpoon

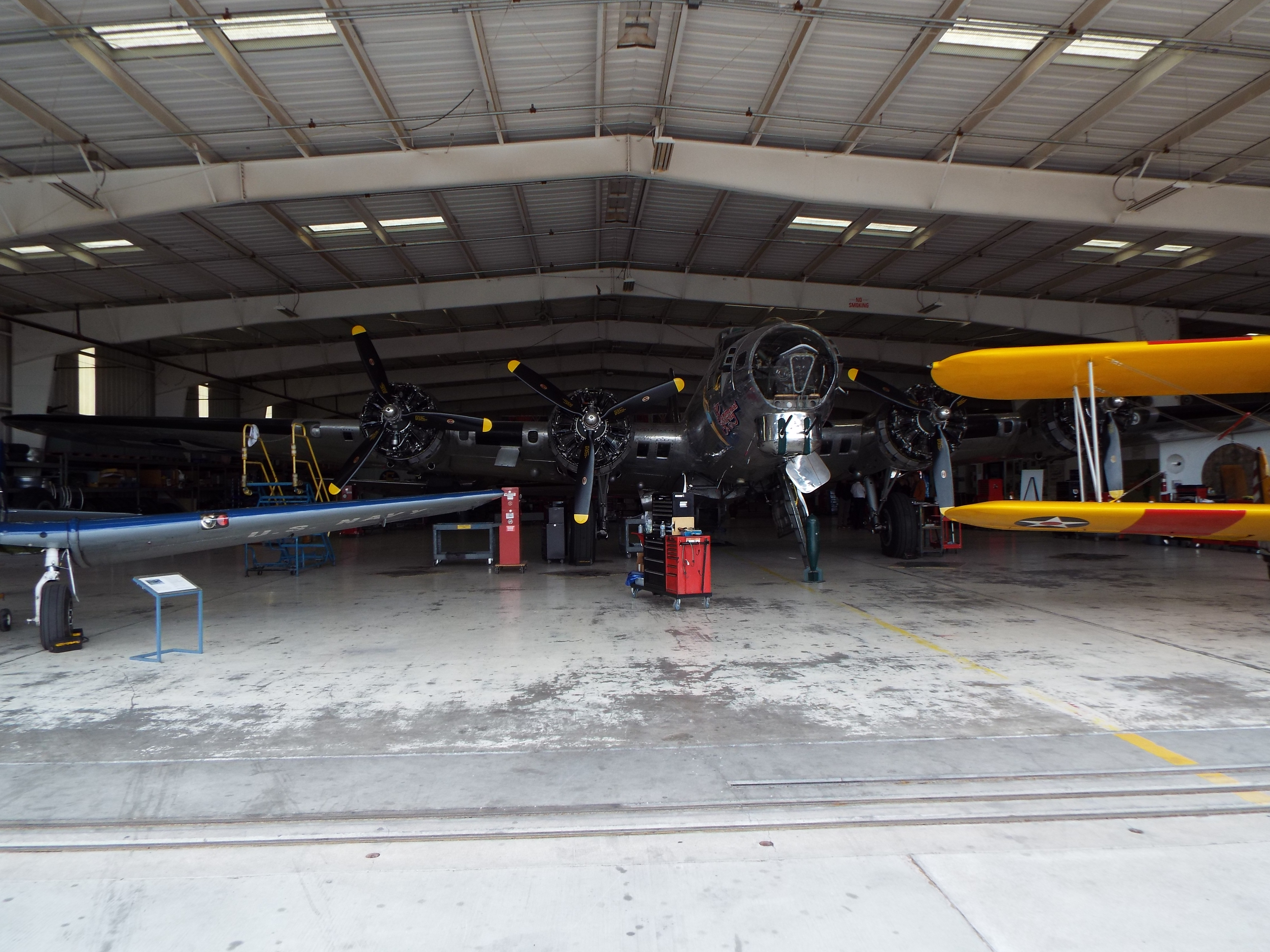
Boeing B-17 in the Mechanics Hangar.

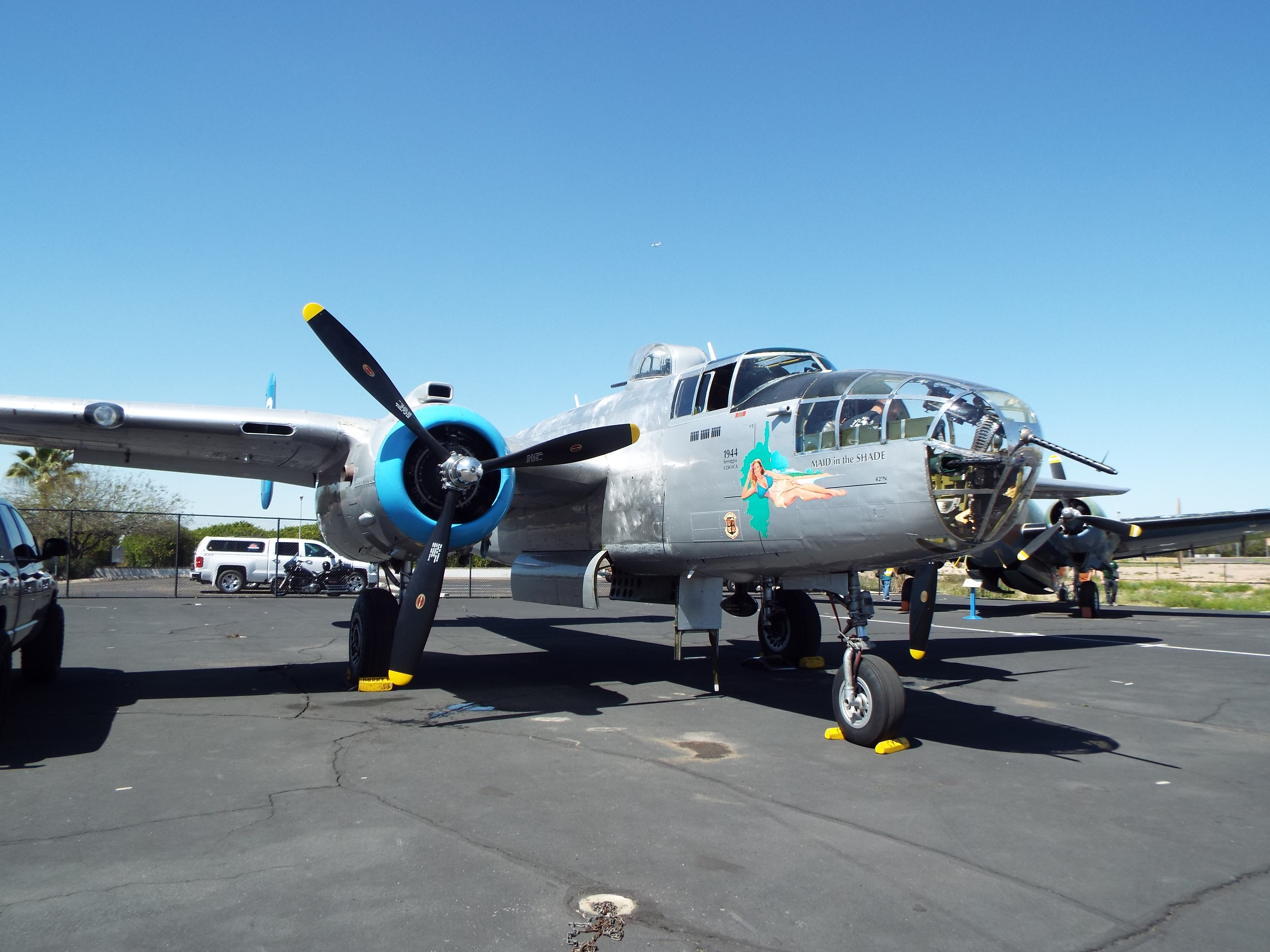
North American B-25 Mitchell-Maid in the Shade

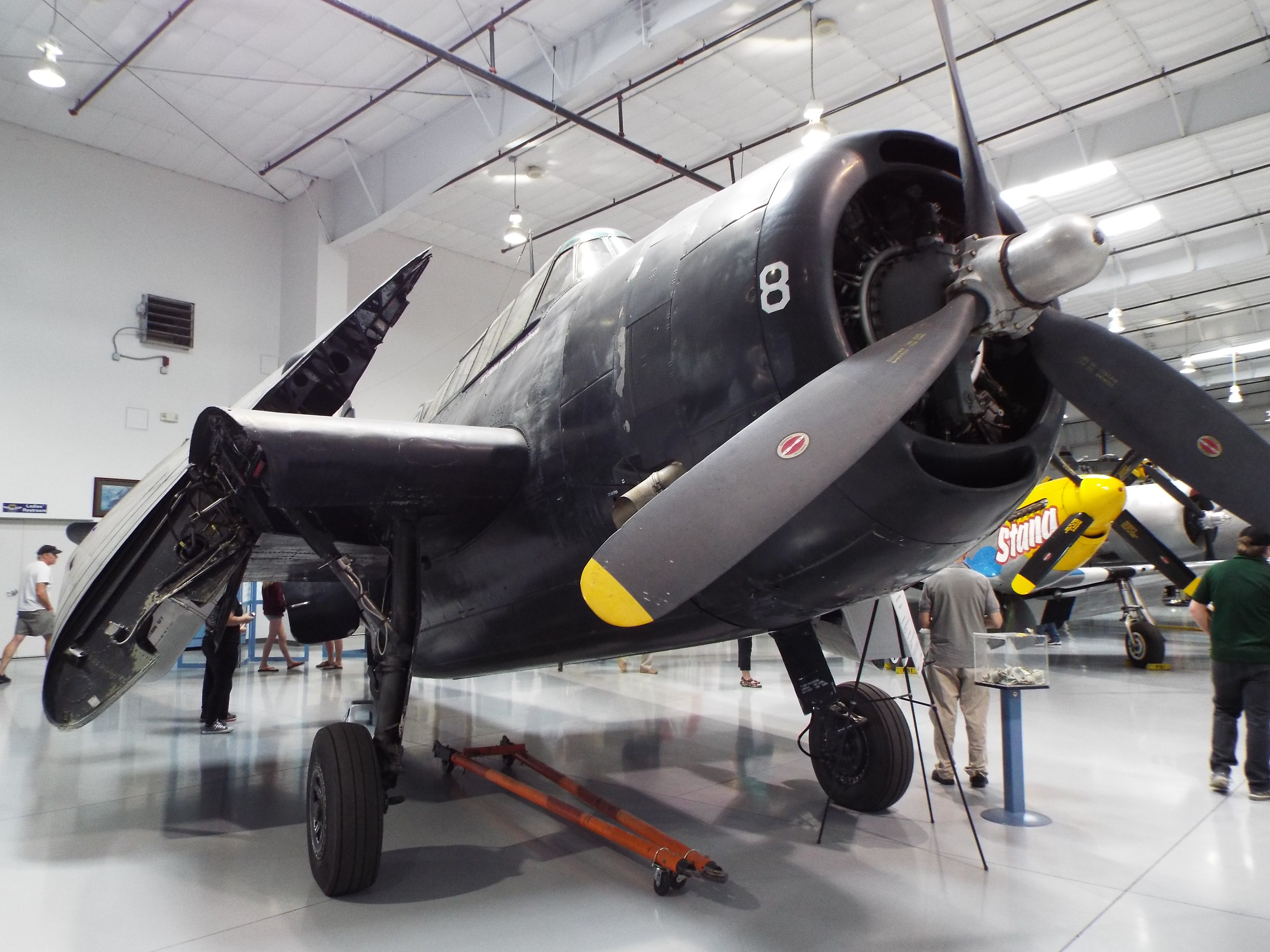
Grumman TBF Avenger Torpedo Bomber

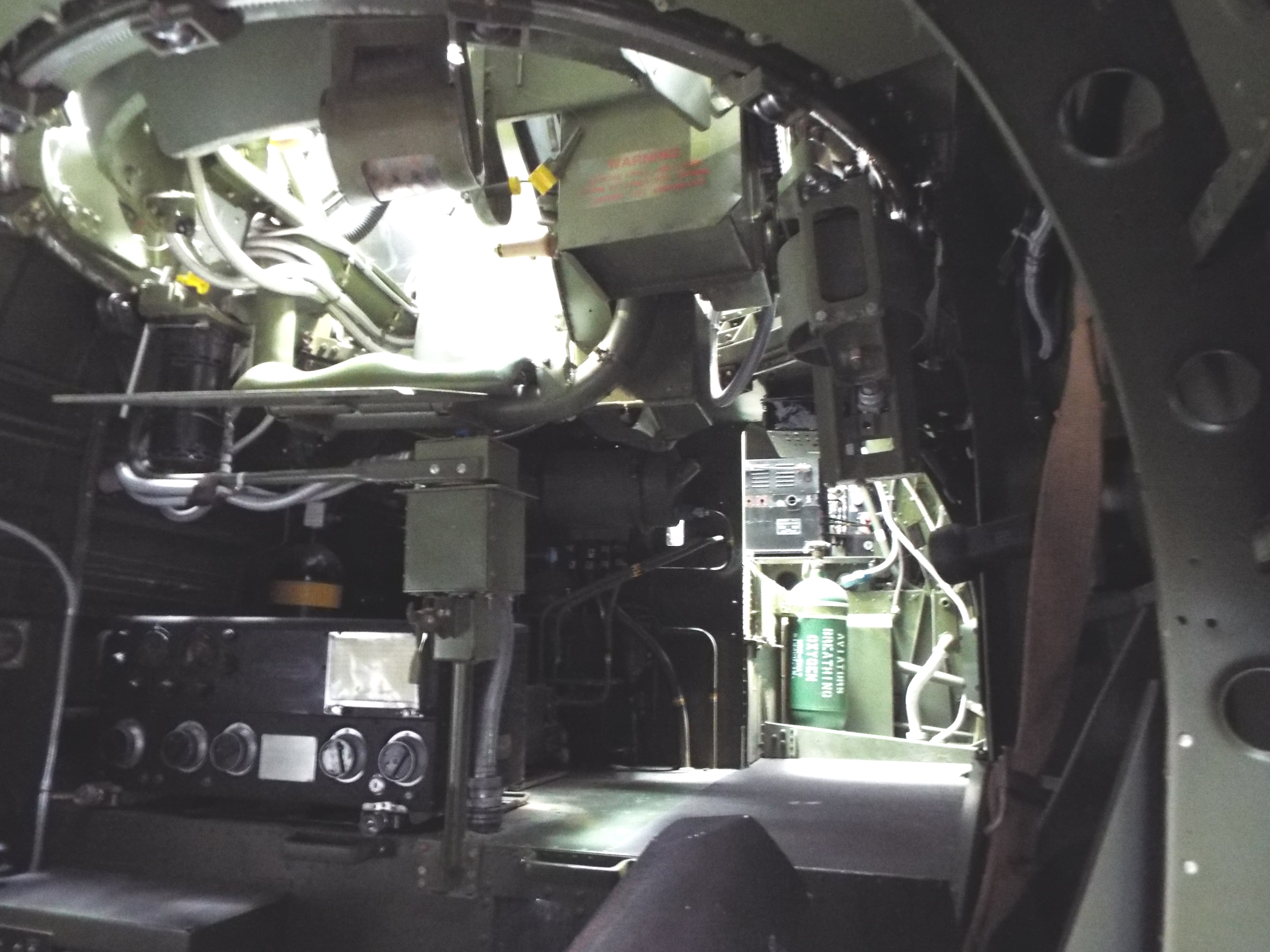
Inside the Grumman TBF Avenger Torpedo Bomber.

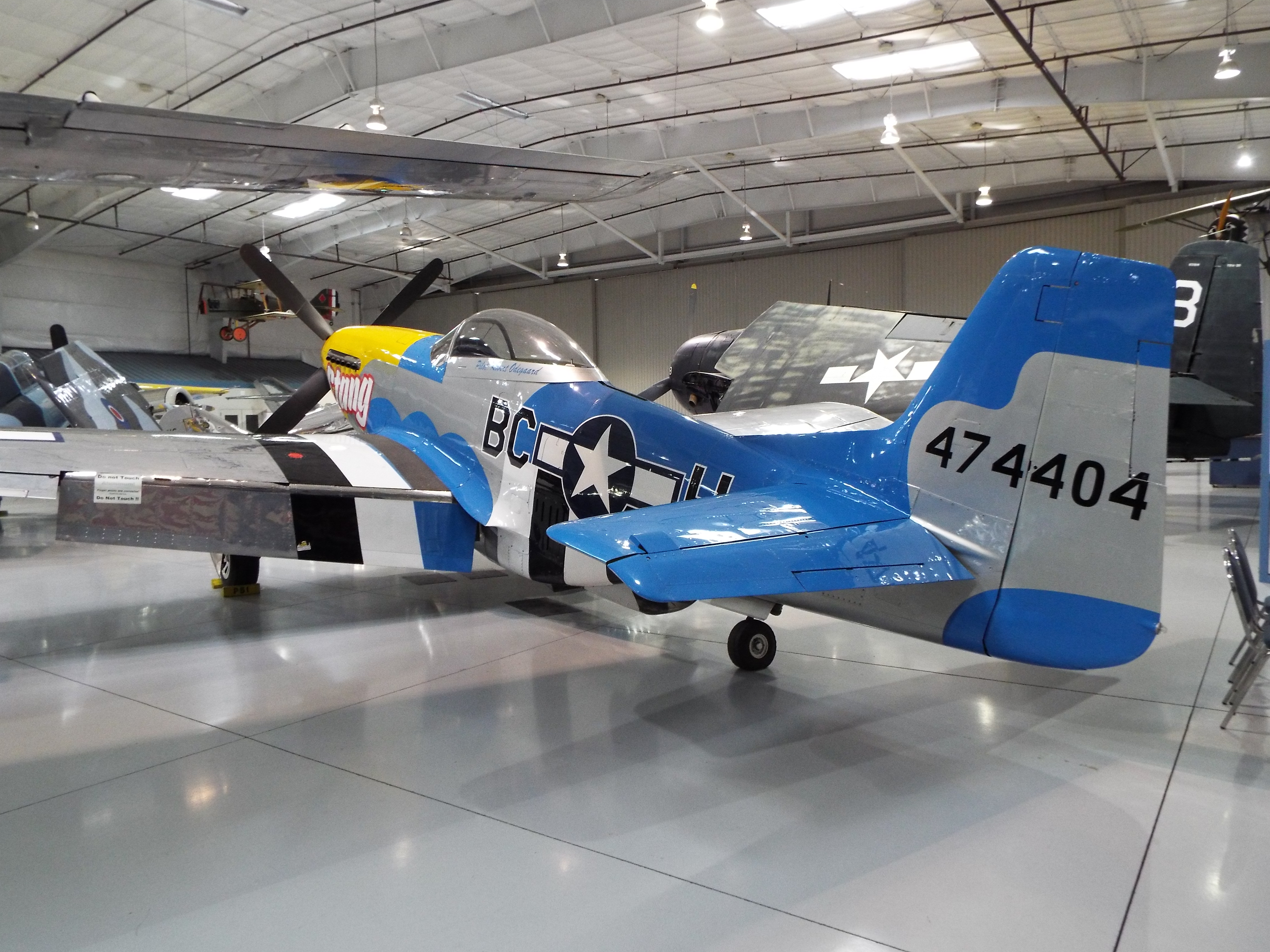
North American P-51D Mustang "Stang"

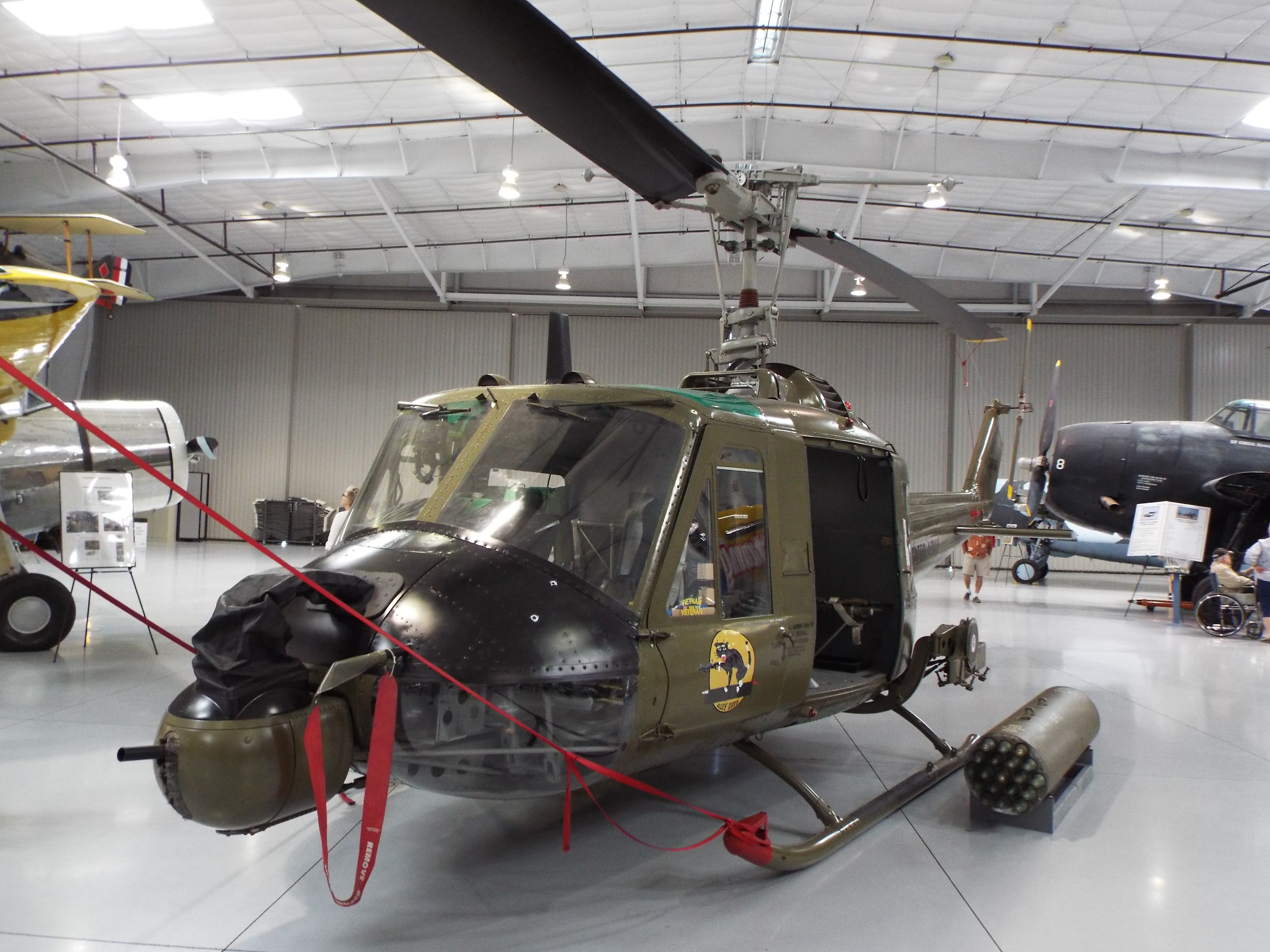
Bell UH-1B Iroquois

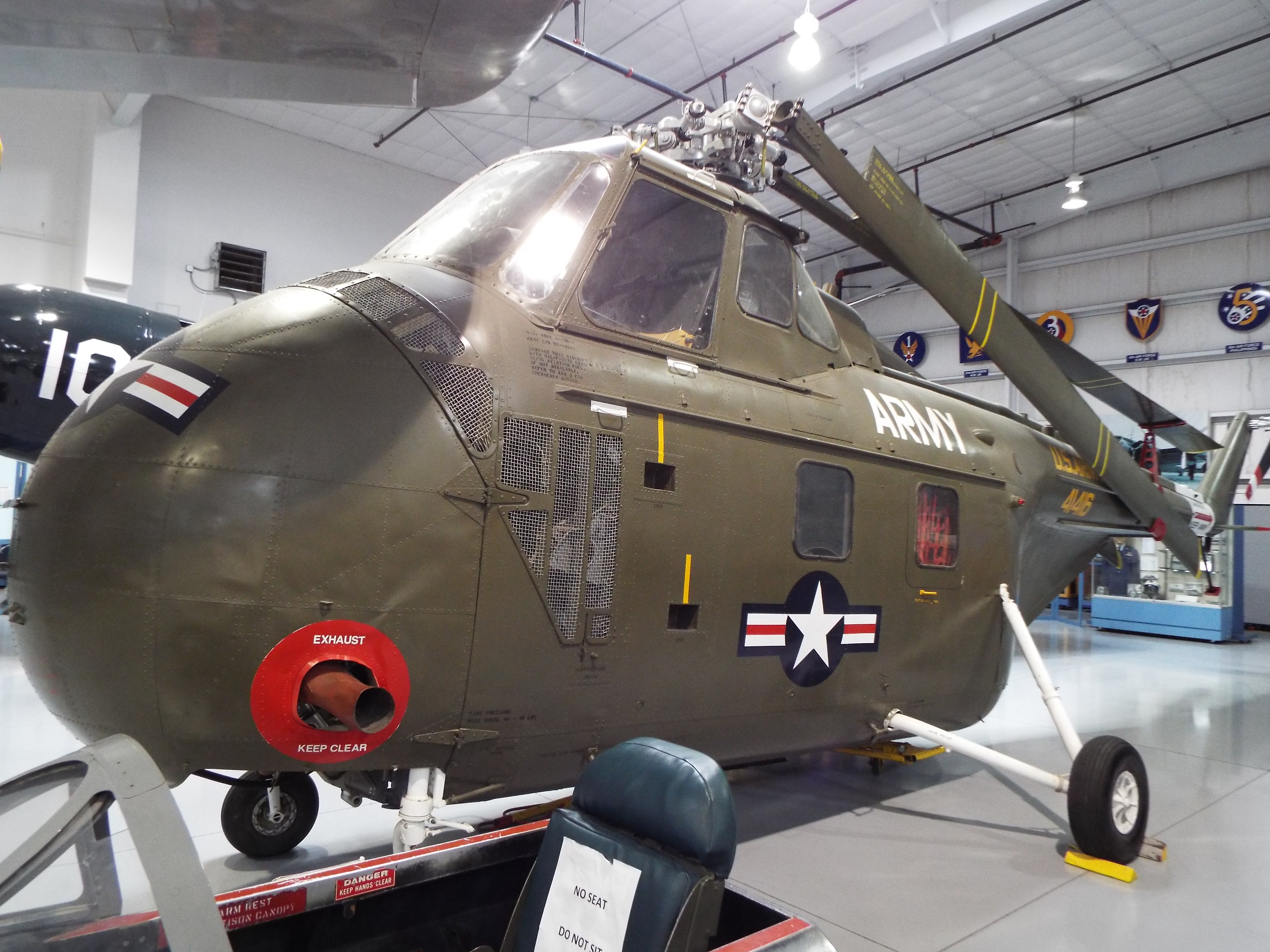
Sikorsky H-19 Chickasaw S-55

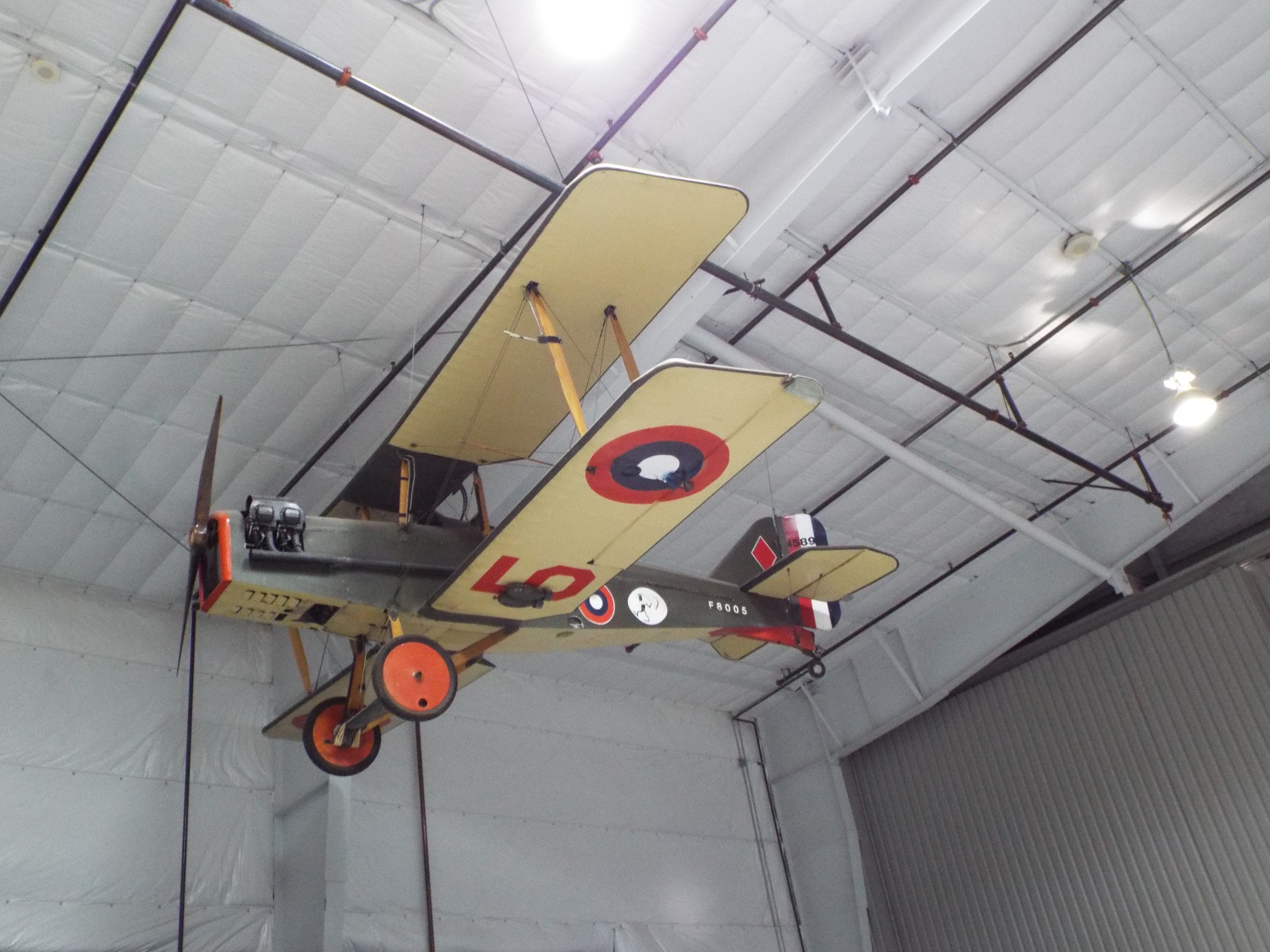
Royal Aircraft Factory S.E.5

== Mesa Grande Ruins ==
The Mesa Grande Cultural Park contains the excavated remnants of a large Hohokam public and ceremonial mound that was occupied from approximately 1100 to 1450. It is located at 1000 N. Date St. The Mesa Grande Cultural Park was listed in the National Register of Historic Places on November 21, 1978, reference number 78000549. The following is a brief description of the images posted.

- The Mesa Grande Temple Mound is located in the Mesa Grande Cultural Park Built by the Hohokam in 1100 AD. The walls are made of "caliche", the calcium carbonate hardpan that forms under the desert soils. The mound is longer and wider than a modern football field (note: U.S. Football) and is 27 feet high.
- A large plaza in front of the Mesa Grande Temple Mound which was enclosed by a large adobe wall.
- One of the two largest networks of irrigation canals created in the prehistoric Americans by the Hohokam.
- A Replica of the Mesa Grande Hohokam Ballcourt . The ballcourt is an open-air structure where the Hohokam played ballgames using a rubber ball made from a local plant.
Mesa Grande Cultural Park

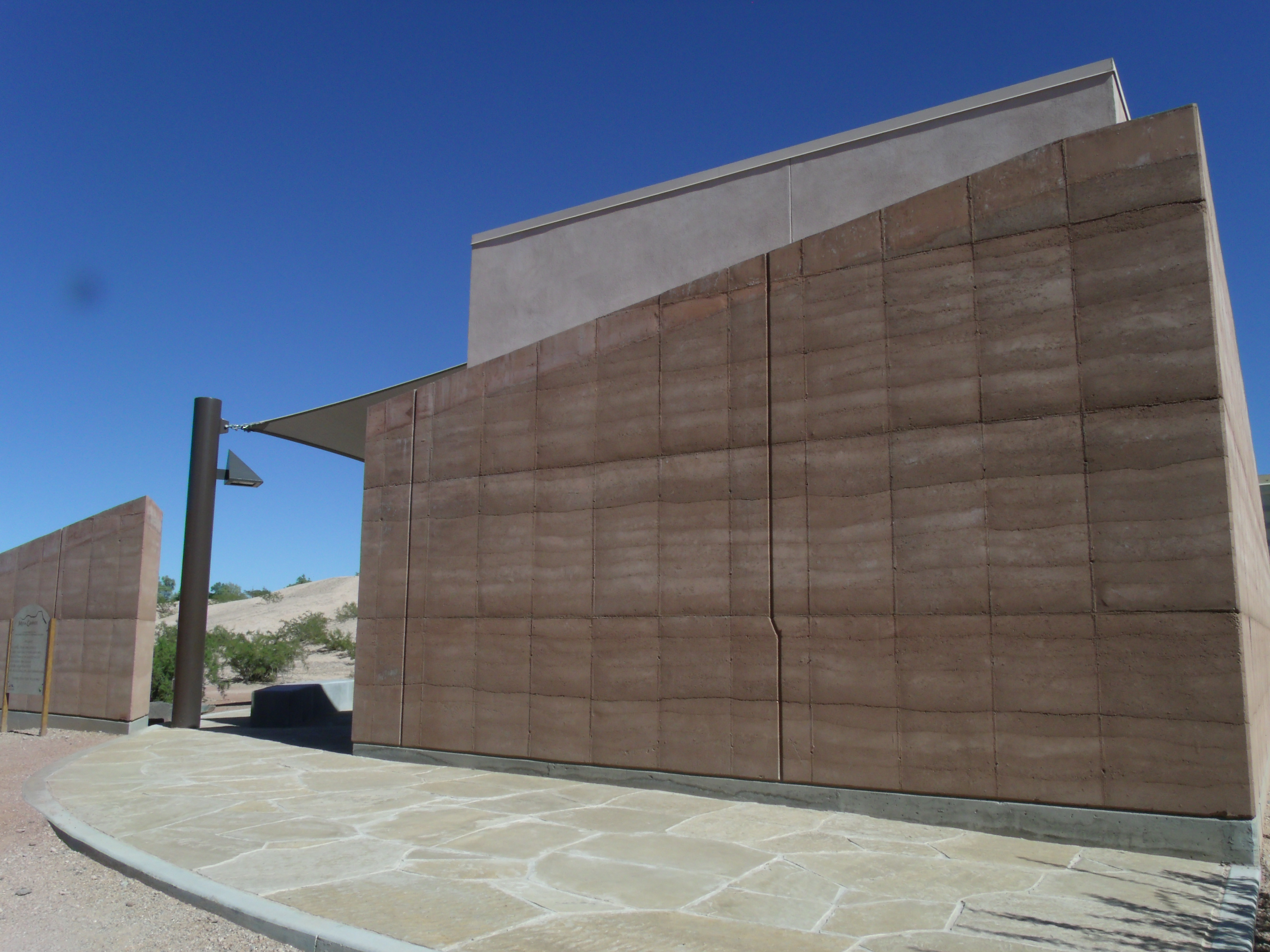
Entrance of the Mesa Grande Cultural Park

(NRHP = National Register of Historic Places)
(MHP = Mesa Historic Properties)
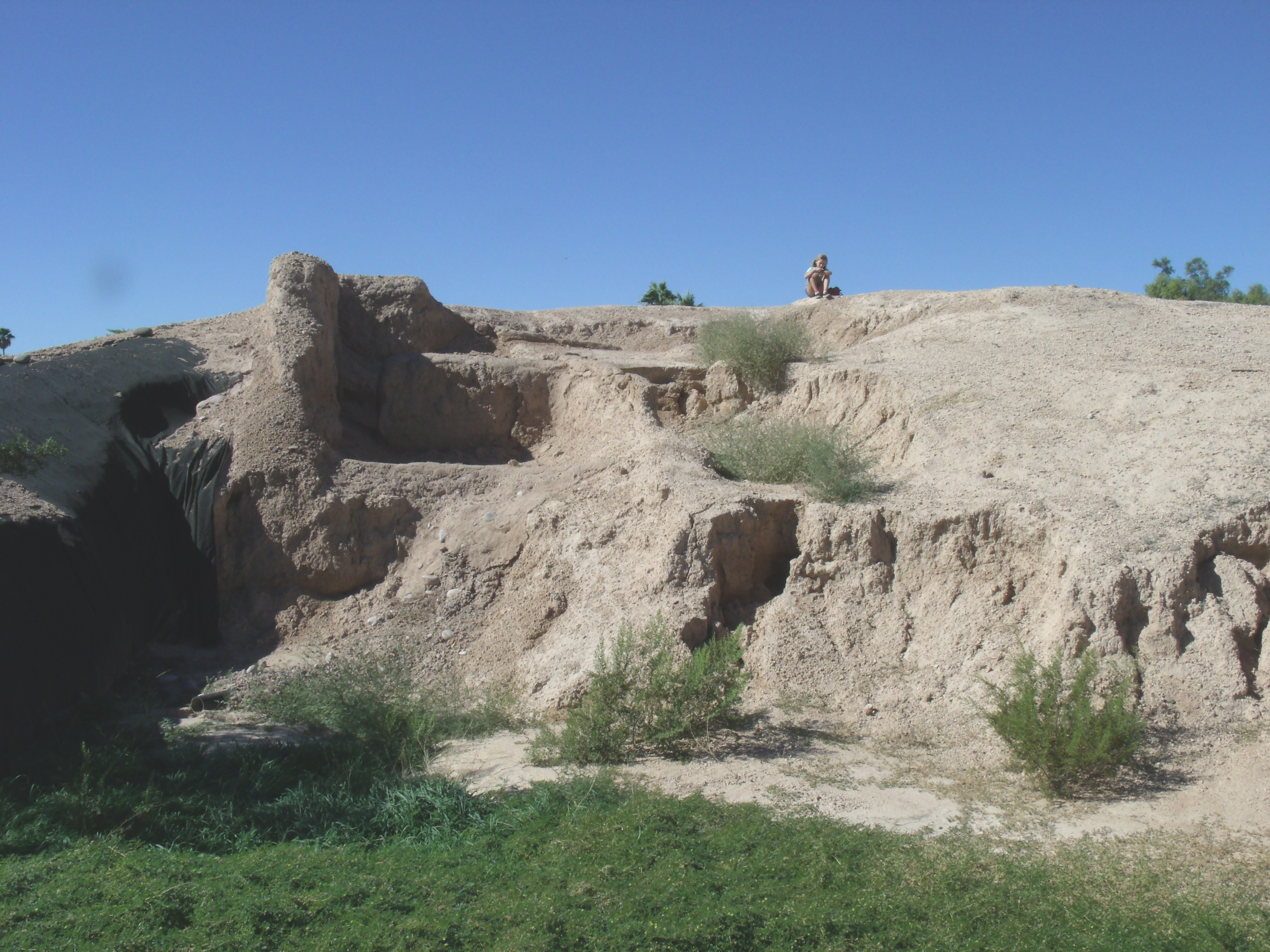
The Mesa Grande Temple Mound .

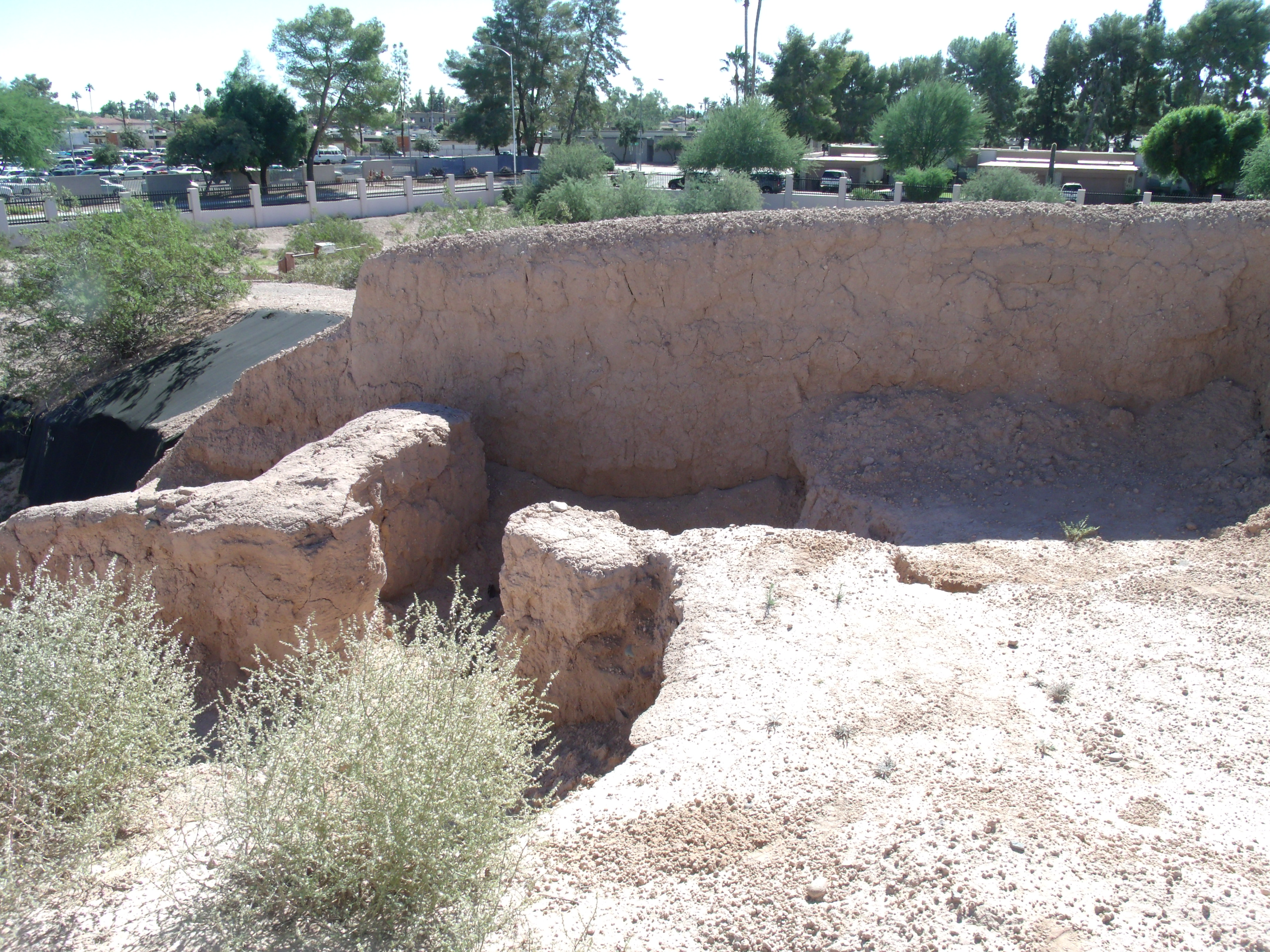
Different view of the Mesa Grande Temple Mound.

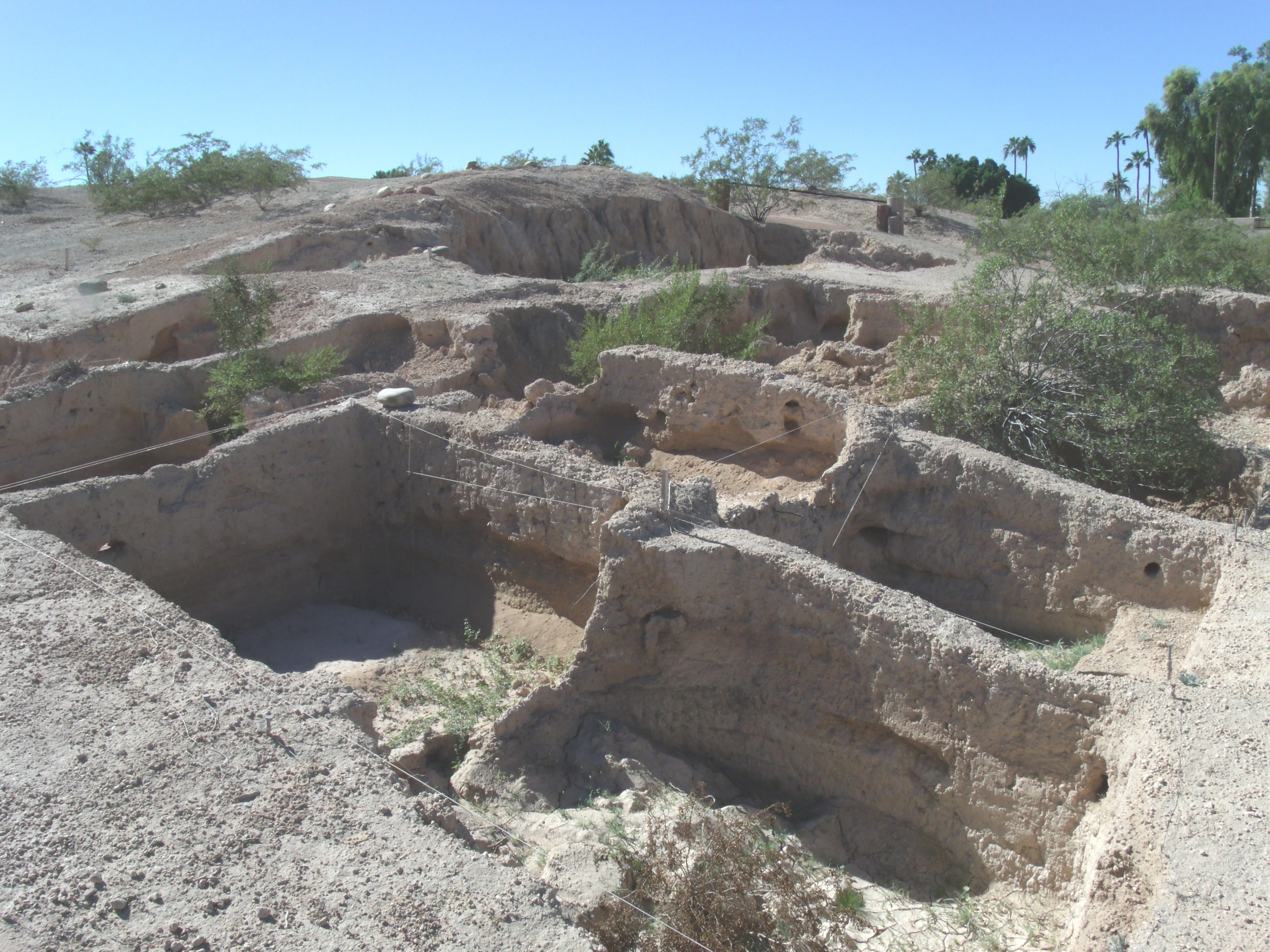
A large plaza in front of the Mesa Grande Temple Mound.

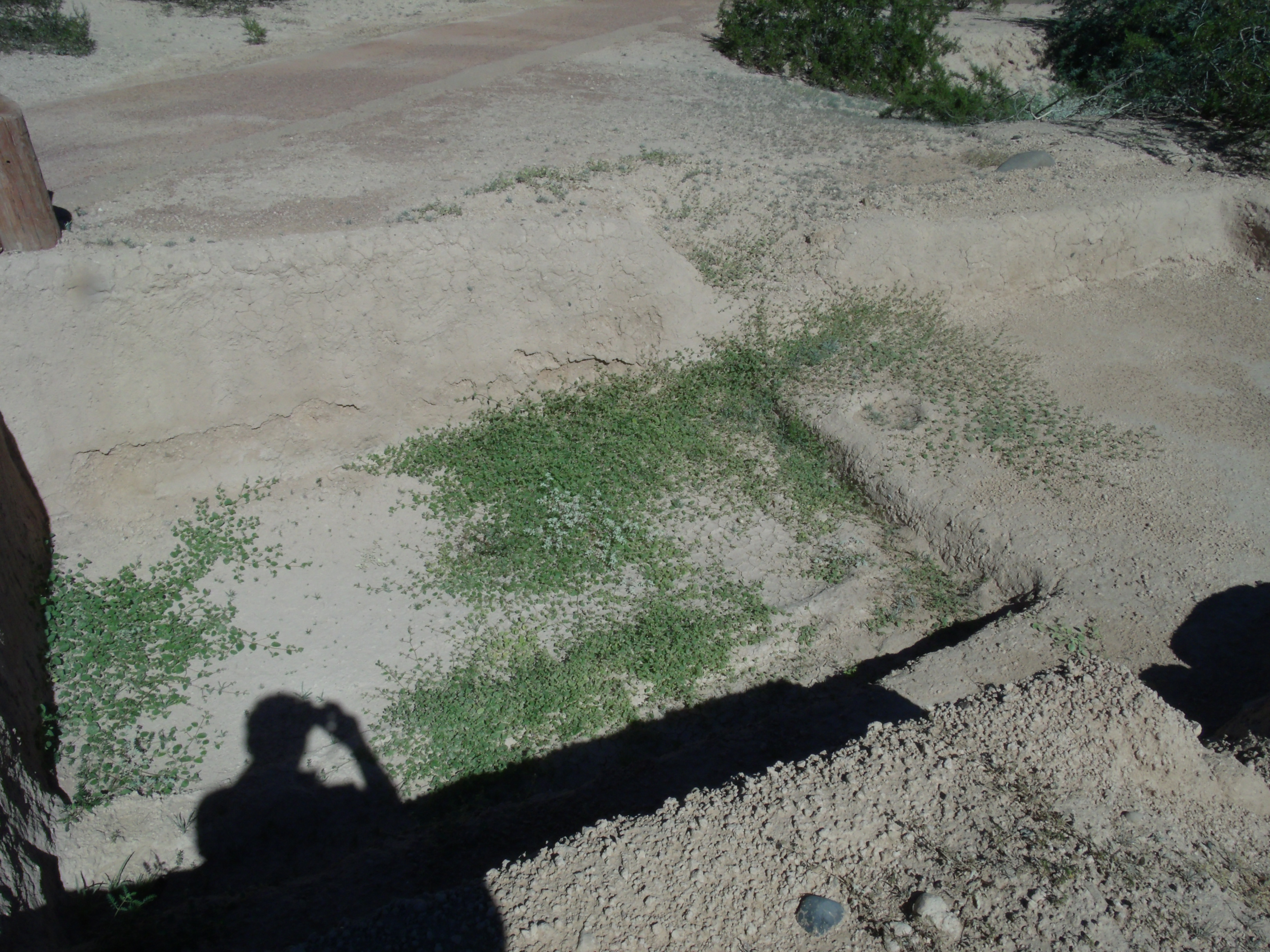
Irrigation canal.

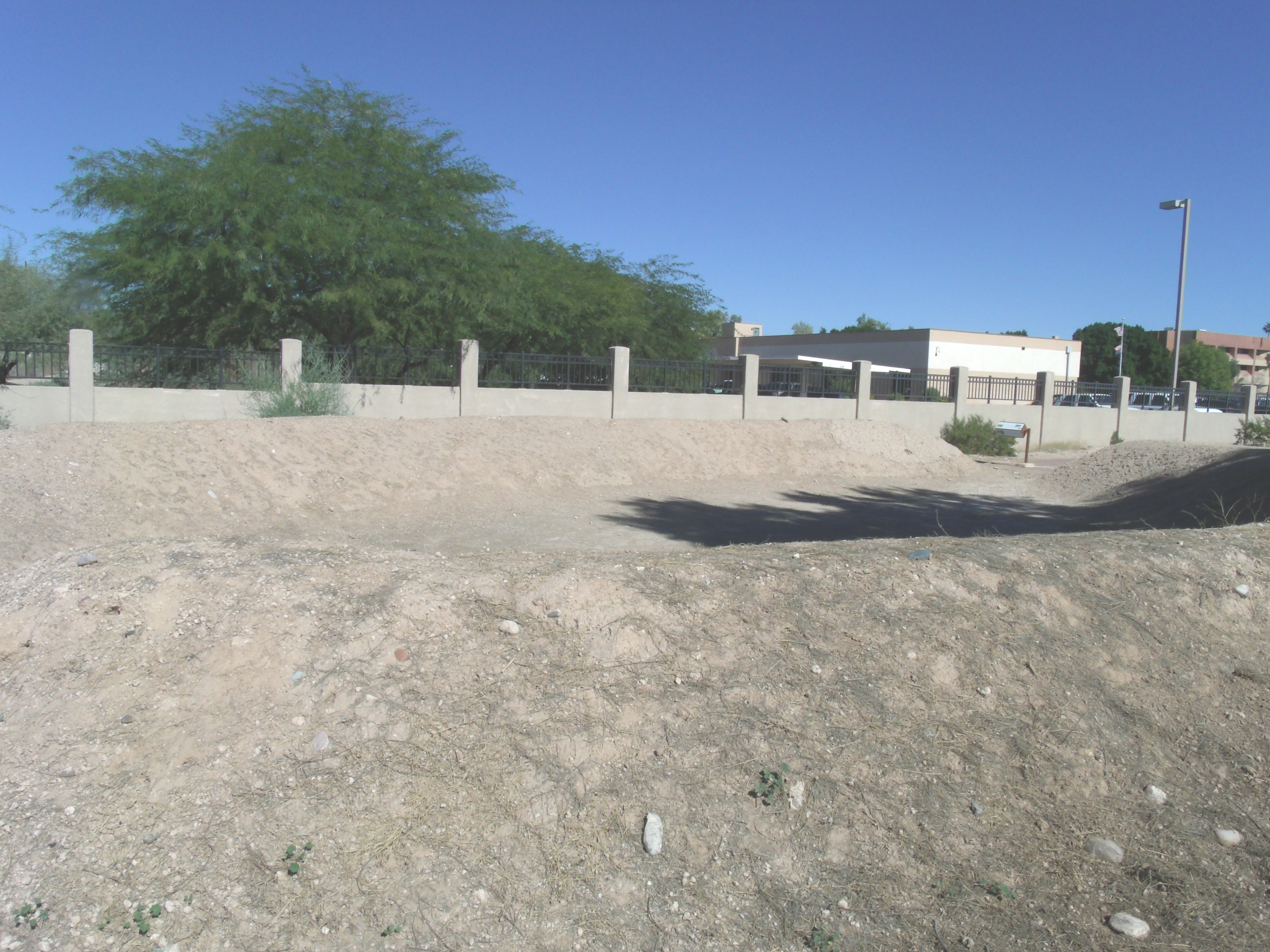
Replica of the Mesa Grande Hohokam Ballcourt .

== Park of the Canals ==
Park of the Canals

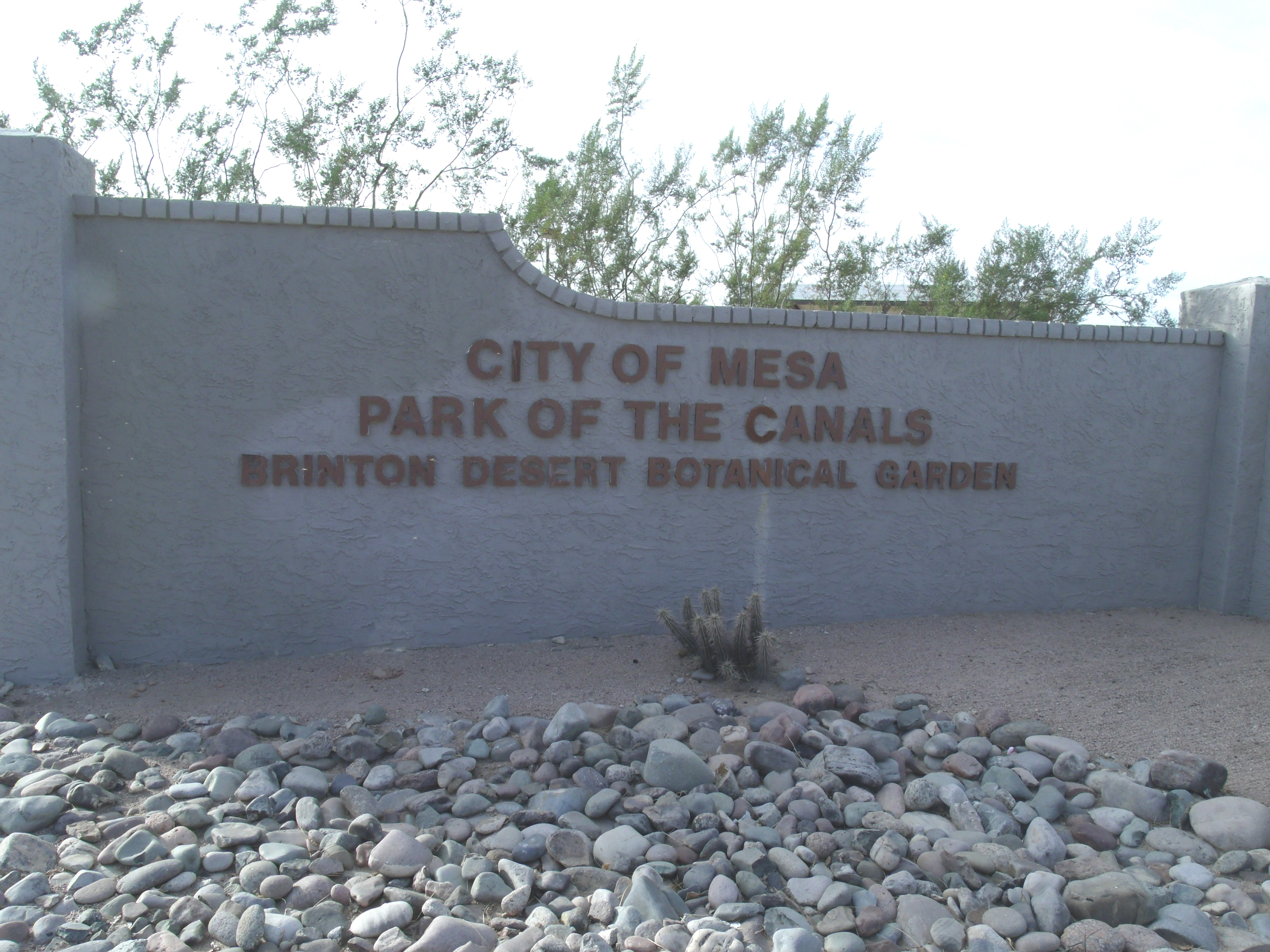
Entrance to the Park of the Canals located at 1710 N Horne Ave.and listed in the National Register of Historic Places on May 30, 1975, reference number 75000350.

(NRHP = National Register of Historic Places)
(MHP = Mesa Historic Properties)
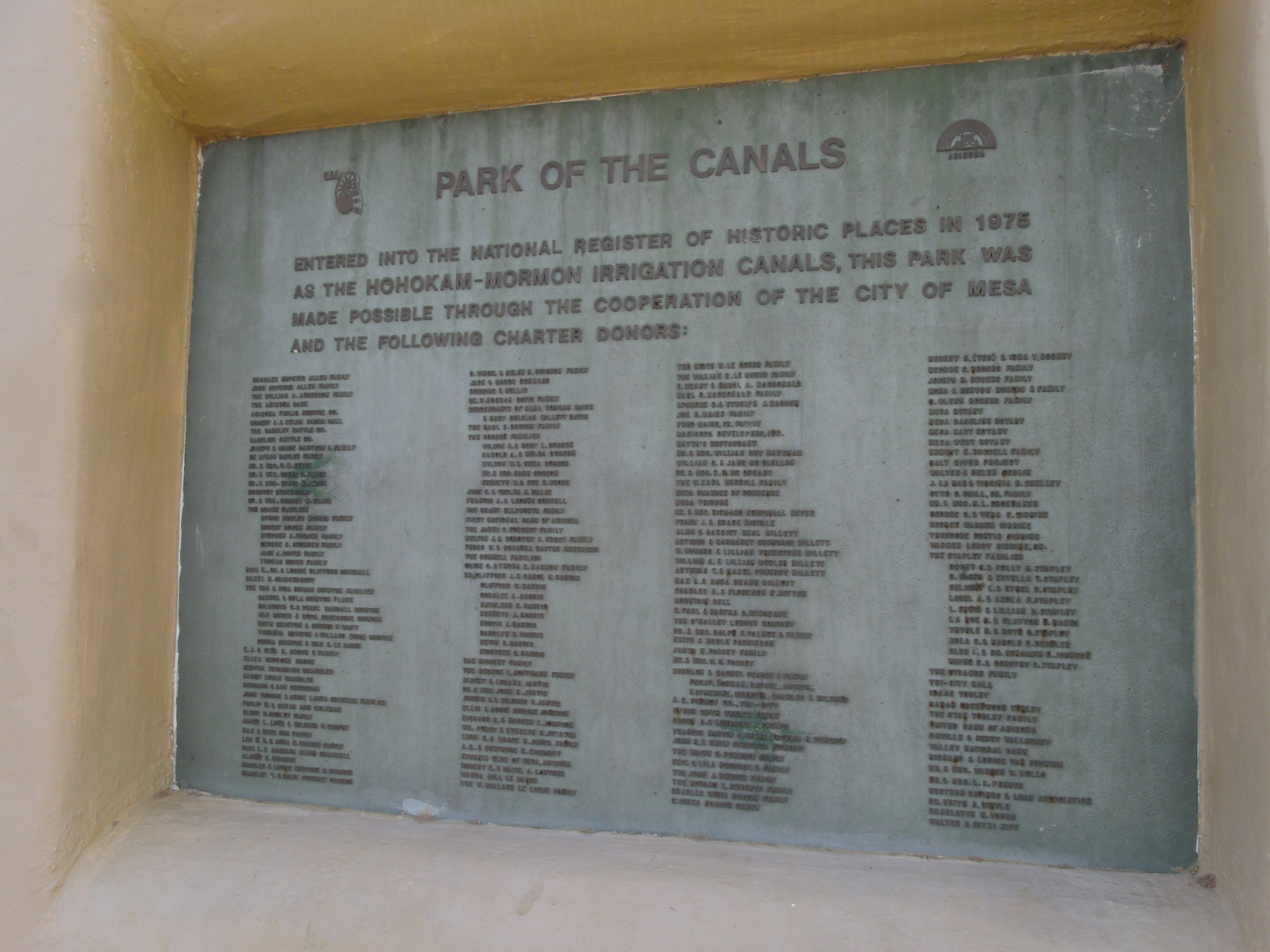
Park of the Canals National Register of Historic Places Marker.

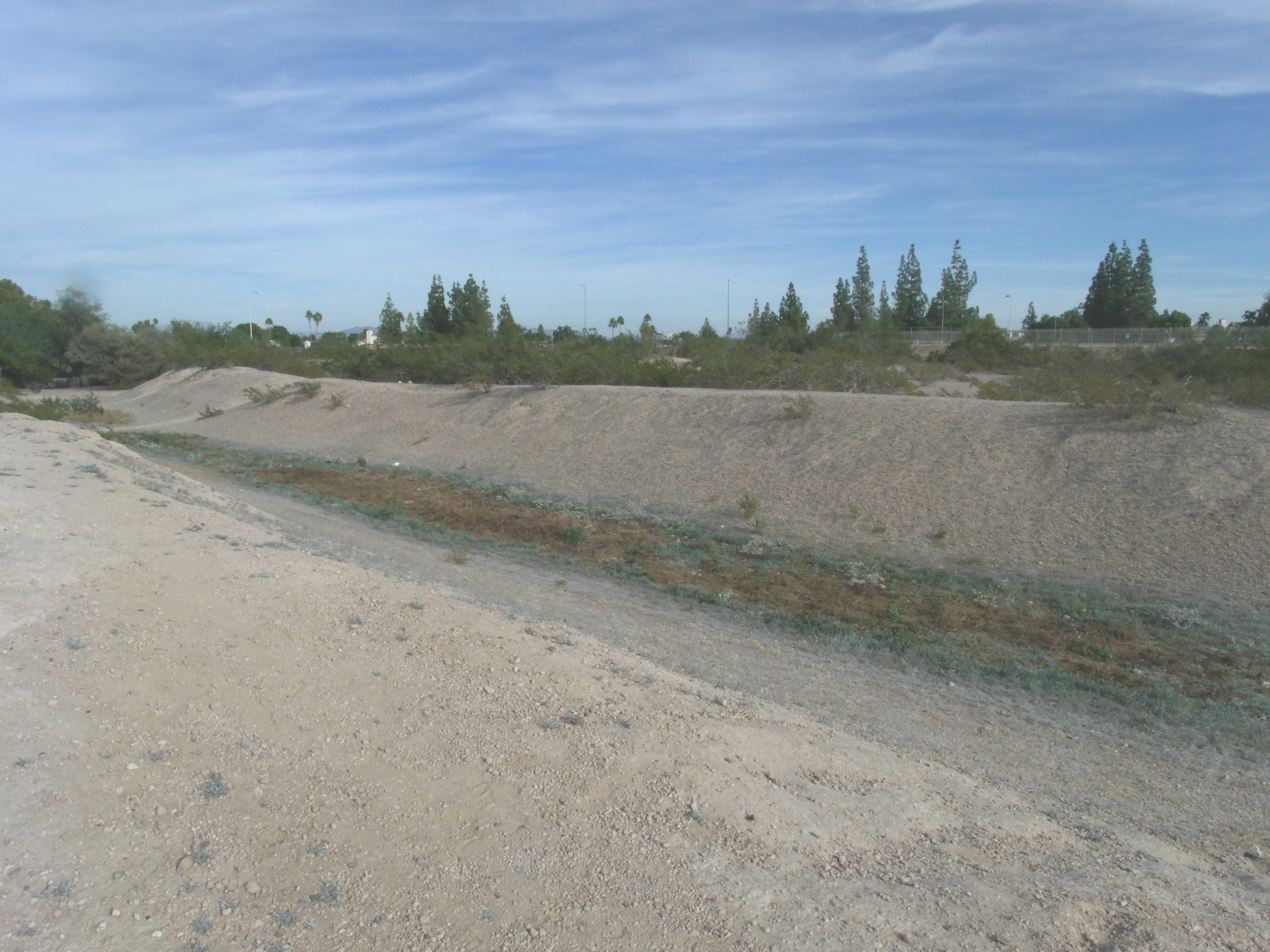
This is an ancient Hohokam canal cleaned out by the Mormon pioneers in 1875.

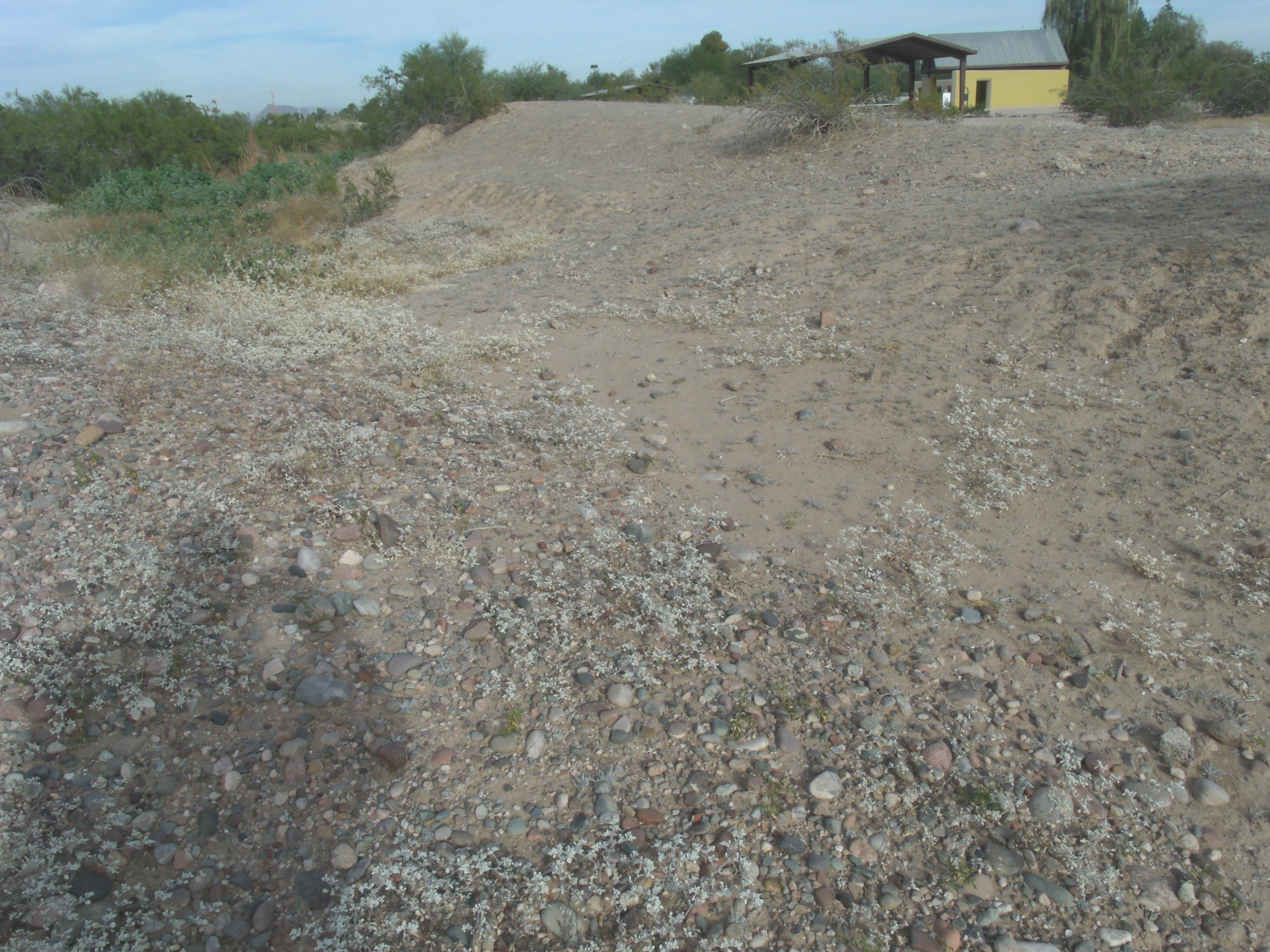
This is a prehistoric canal built by the Hohokams.

== City of Mesa Cemetery ==
The City of Mesa Cemetery is a historic cemetery which was established in 1891 and is located at 1212 N. Center Street. Among the many notable citizens of that city which are interred there are the four founding fathers of Mesa:

- Charles Crismon (1805–1890)
- Francis Martin Pomeroy (1822–1882)
- Charles Innes Robson (1837–1894)
- George Warren Sirrine (1818–1902). His house, the "Sirrine house", is listed in the National Register of Historic Places, reference number 95001082.
City of Mesa Cemetery

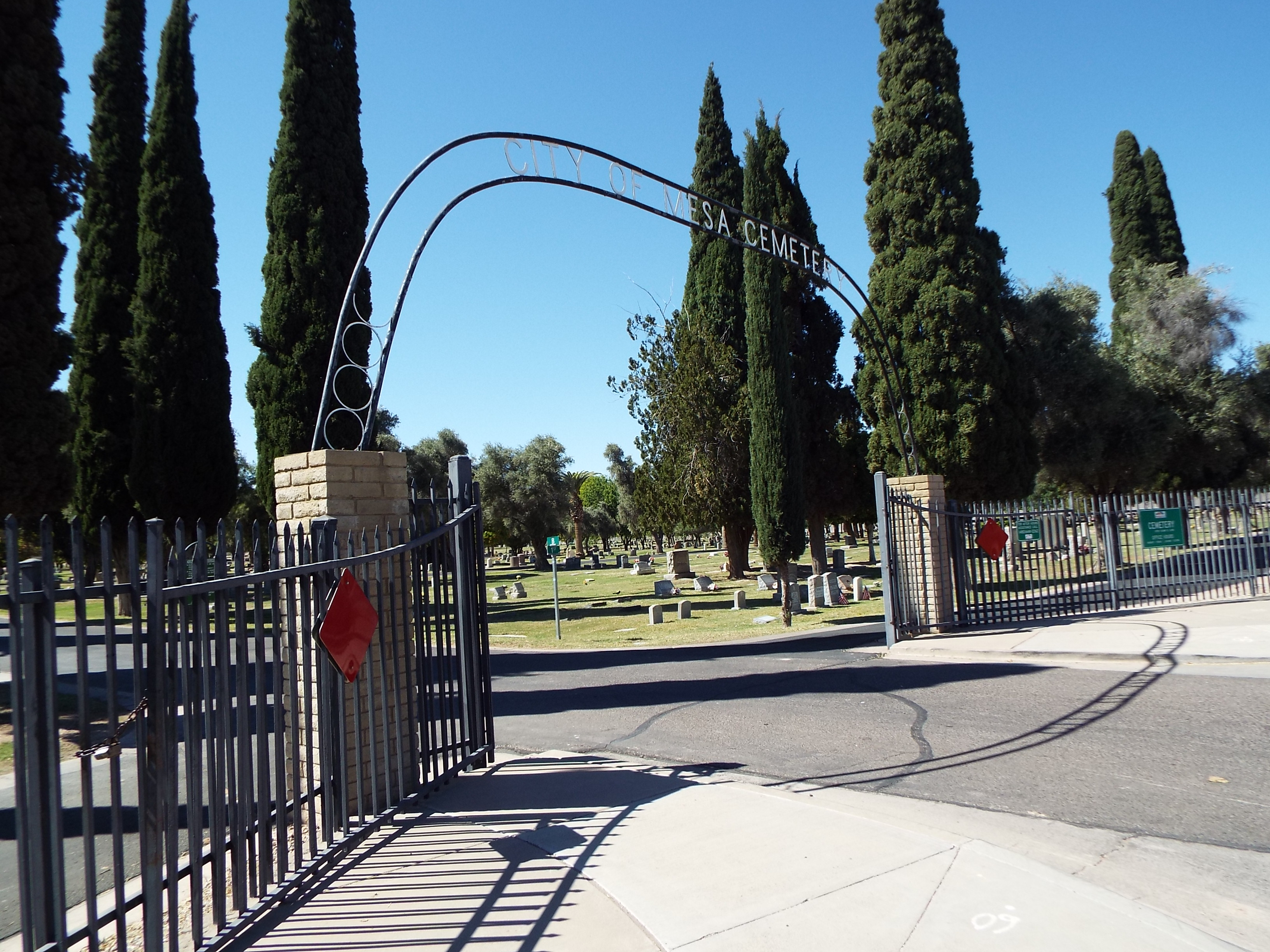
Entrance to the City of Mesa Cemetery

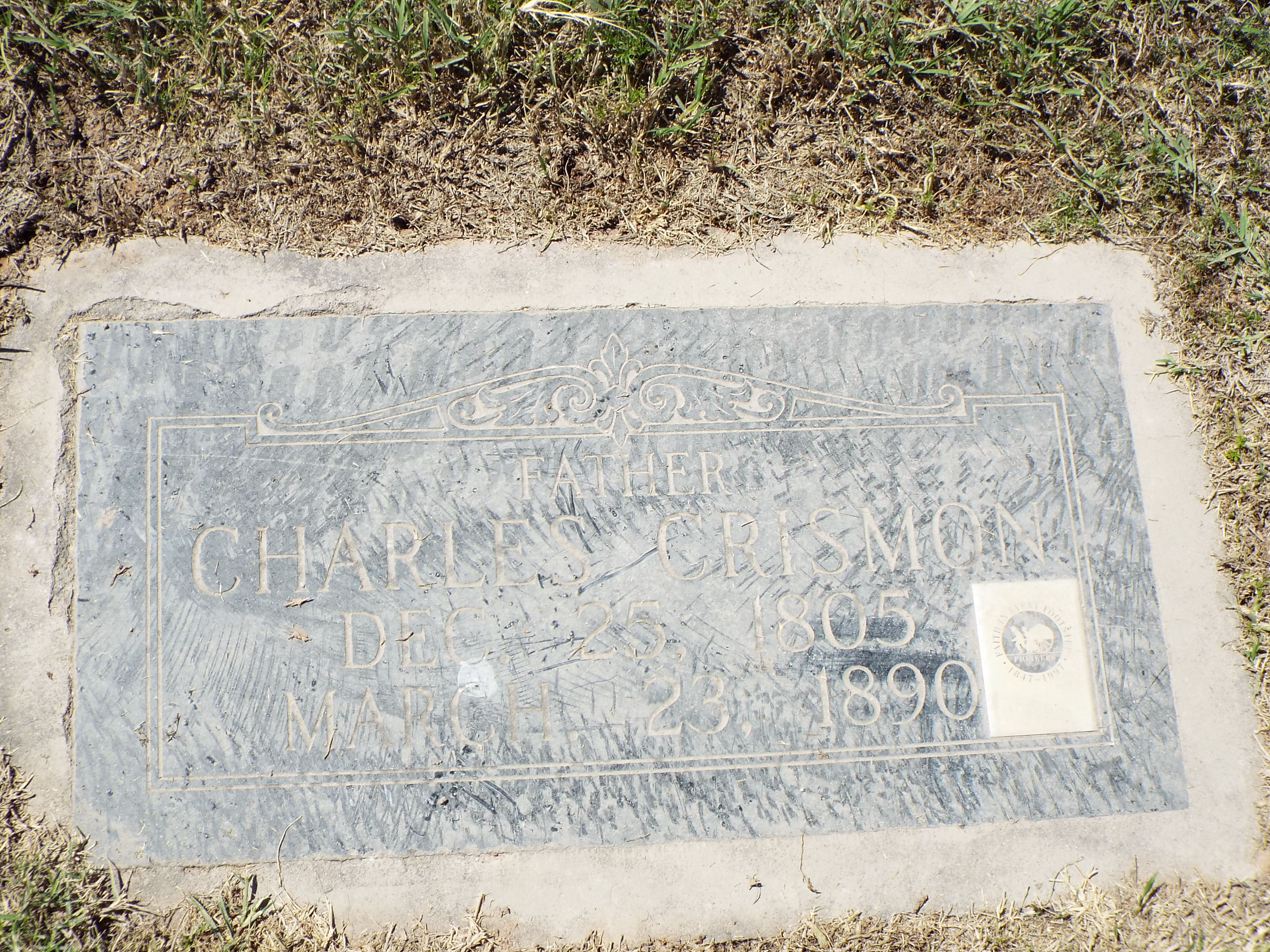
Grave of Charles Crismon, Block #76.

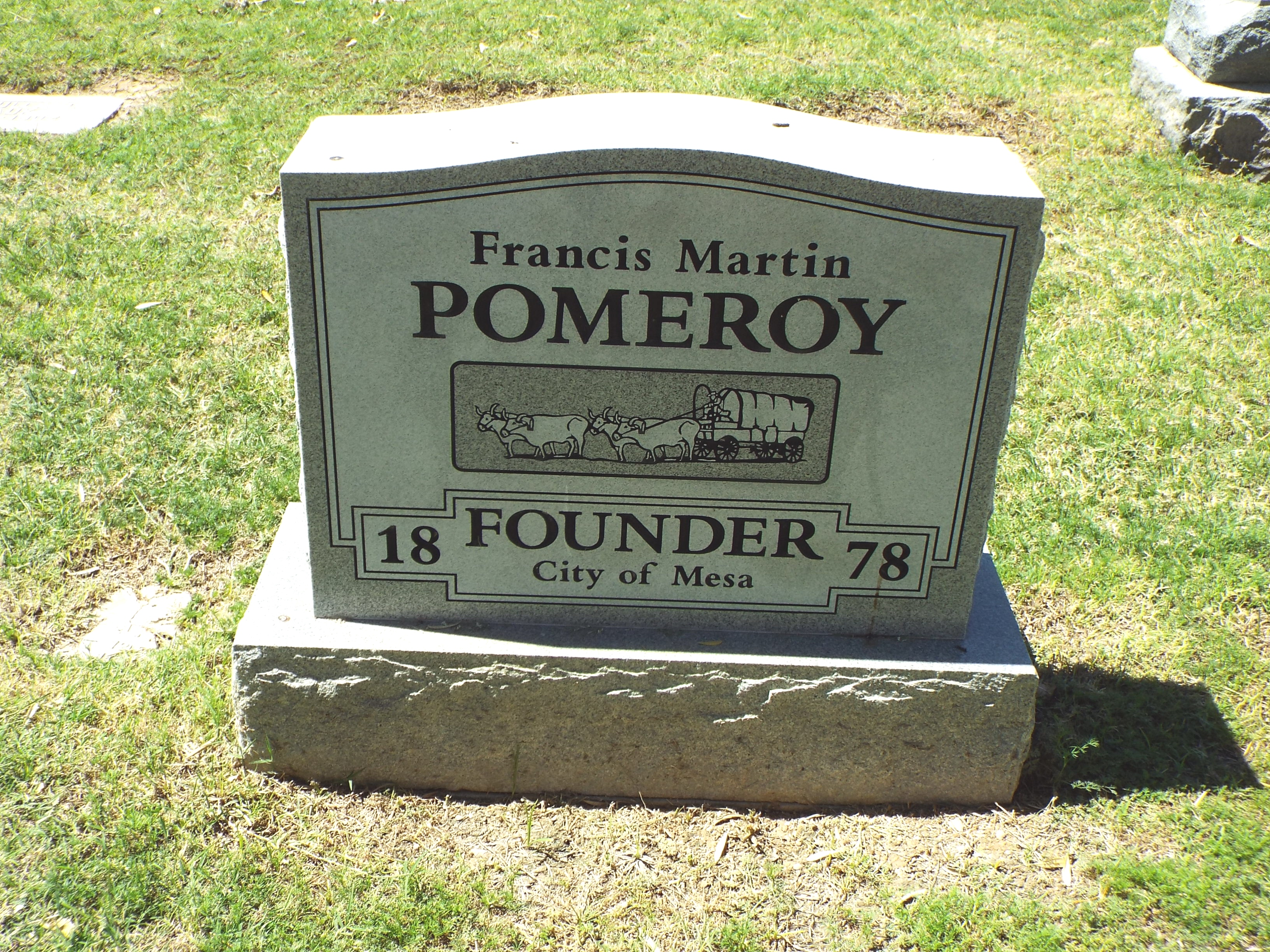
Grave of Francis Martin Pomeroy, Block #72.

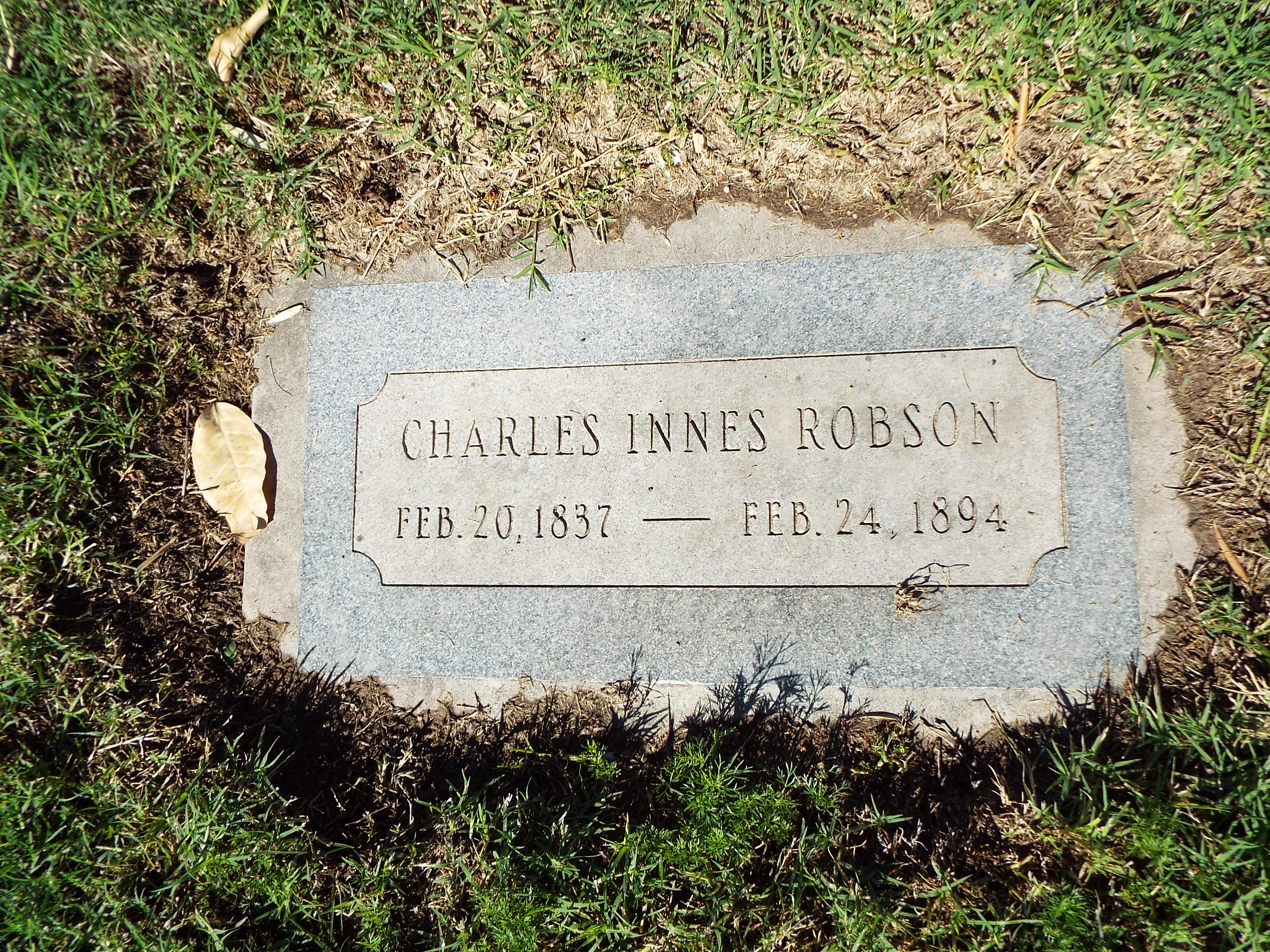
Grave of Charles Innes Robson (1837–1894), Block #72.

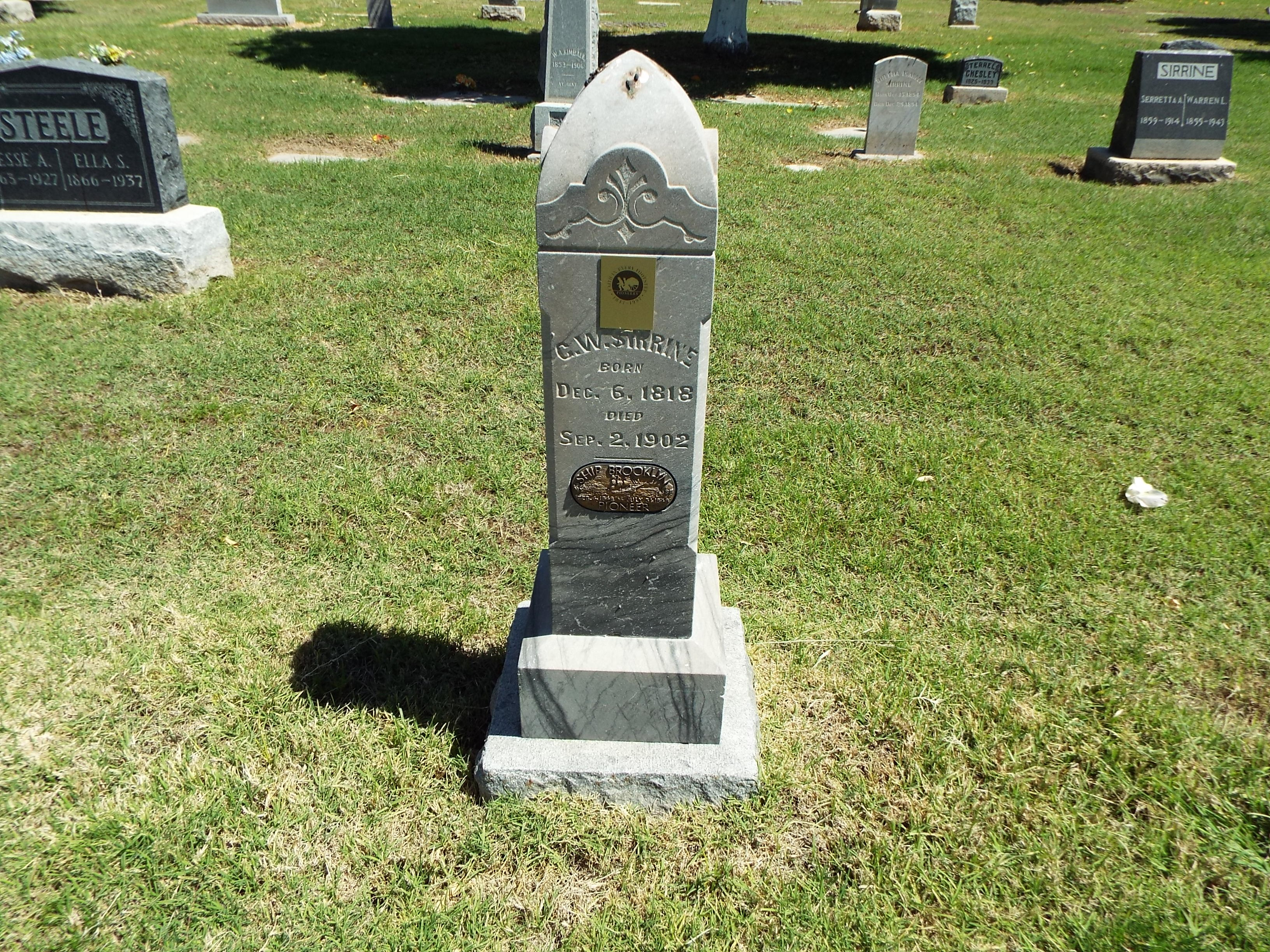
Grave of George Warren Sirrine, Block #82.

== See also ==
- National Register of Historic Places listings in Phoenix, Arizona
- National Register of Historic Places listings in Maricopa County, Arizona
